= Lift-to-drag ratio =

Measure of aerodynamic efficiency

Lift and drag are the two components of the total aerodynamic force acting on an aerofoil or aircraft.

In aerodynamics, the lift-to-drag ratio (or L/D ratio) is the lift generated by an aerodynamic body such as an aerofoil or aircraft, divided by the aerodynamic drag caused by moving through air. It describes the aerodynamic efficiency under given flight conditions. The L/D ratio for any given body will vary according to these flight conditions.

For an aerofoil wing or powered aircraft, the L/D is specified when in straight and level flight. For a glider it determines the glide ratio, of distance travelled against loss of height.

The term is calculated for any particular airspeed by measuring the lift generated, then dividing by the drag at that speed. These vary with speed, so the results are typically plotted on a 2-dimensional graph. In almost all cases the graph forms a U-shape, due to the two main components of drag. The L/D may be calculated using computational fluid dynamics or computer simulation. It is measured empirically by testing in a wind tunnel or in free flight test.

The L/D ratio is affected by both the form drag of the body and by the induced drag associated with creating a lifting force. It depends principally on the lift and drag coefficients, angle of attack to the airflow and the wing aspect ratio.

The L/D ratio is inversely proportional to the energy required for a given flightpath, so that doubling the L/D ratio will require only half of the energy for the same distance travelled. This results directly in better fuel economy.

The L/D ratio can also be used for water craft and land vehicles. The L/D ratios for hydrofoil boats and displacement craft are determined similarly to aircraft.

== Lift and drag ==
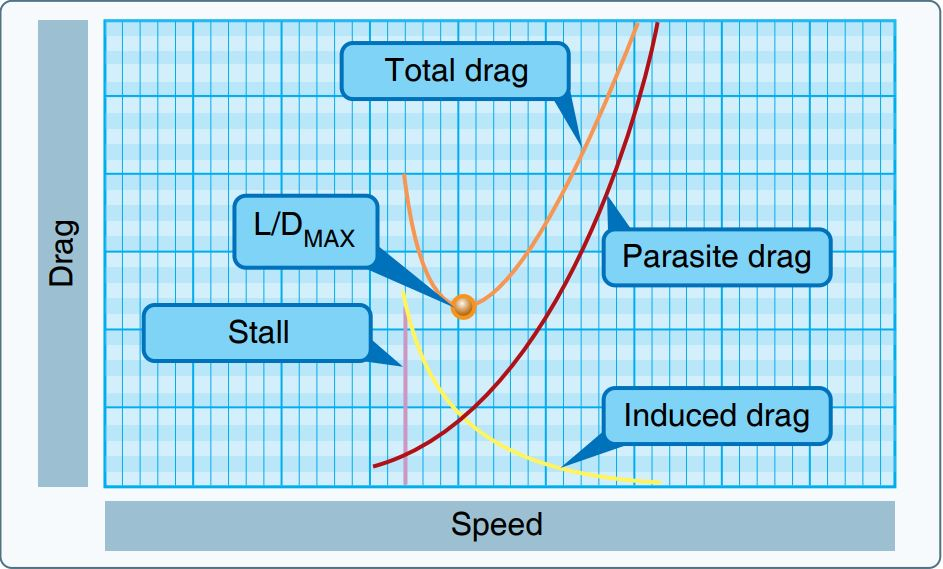
Drag vis-à-vis Speed. L/DMAX occurs at minimum Total Drag (e.g. Parasite plus Induced)

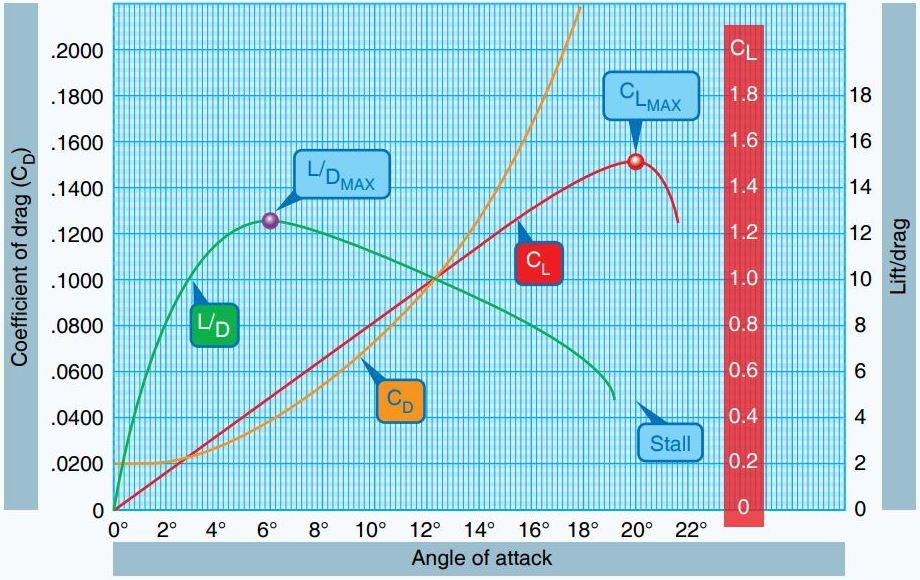
Coefficients of drag C_{D} and lift C_{L} vs angle of attack.

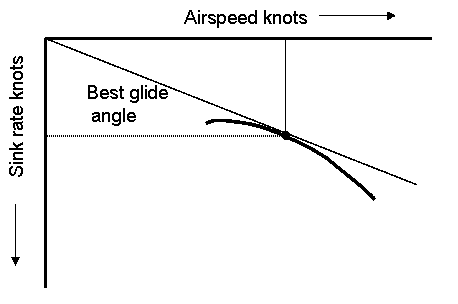
Polar curve showing glide angle for the best glide speed (best L/D). It is the flattest possible glide angle through calm air, which will maximize the distance flown. This airspeed (vertical line) corresponds to the tangent point of a line starting from the origin of the graph. A glider flying faster or slower than this airspeed will cover less distance before landing.

Lift can be created when an aerofoil-shaped body travels through a viscous fluid such as air. The aerofoil is often cambered and/or set at an angle of attack to the airflow. The lift then increases as the square of the airspeed.

Whenever an aerodynamic body generates lift, this also creates lift-induced drag or induced drag. At low speeds an aircraft has to generate lift with a higher angle of attack, which results in a greater induced drag. This term dominates the low-speed side of the graph of lift versus velocity.

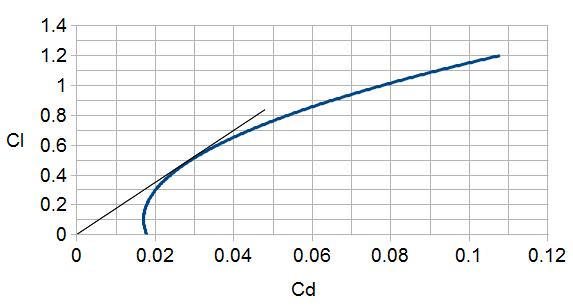
Drag curve for light aircraft. The tangent gives the maximum L/D point.

Form drag is caused by movement of the body through air. This type of drag, known also as air resistance or profile drag varies with the square of speed (see drag equation). For this reason profile drag is more pronounced at greater speeds, forming the right side of the lift/velocity graph's U shape. Profile drag is lowered primarily by streamlining and reducing cross section.

The total drag on any aerodynamic body thus has two components, induced drag and form drag.

=== Lift and drag coefficients ===
The rates of change of lift and drag with angle of attack (AoA) are called respectively the lift and drag coefficients C_{L} and C_{D}. The varying ratio of lift to drag with AoA is often plotted in terms of these coefficients.

For any given value of lift, the AoA varies with speed. Graphs of C_{L} and C_{D} vs. speed are referred to as drag curves. Speed is shown increasing from left to right. The lift/drag ratio is given by the slope from the origin to some point on the curve and so the maximum L/D ratio does not occur at the point of least drag coefficient, the leftmost point. Instead, it occurs at a slightly greater speed. Designers will typically select a wing design which produces an L/D peak at the chosen cruising speed for a powered fixed-wing aircraft, thereby maximizing economy. Like all things in aeronautical engineering, the lift-to-drag ratio is not the only consideration for wing design. Performance at a high angle of attack and a gentle stall are also important.

== Glide ratio ==
As the aircraft fuselage and control surfaces will also add drag and possibly some lift, it is fair to consider the L/D of the aircraft as a whole. The glide ratio, which is the ratio of an (unpowered) aircraft's forward motion to its descent, is (when flown at constant speed) numerically equal to the aircraft's L/D. This is especially of interest in the design and operation of high performance sailplanes, which can have glide ratios almost 60 to 1 (60 units of distance forward for each unit of descent) in the best cases, but with 30:1 being considered good performance for general recreational use. Achieving a glider's best L/D in practice requires precise control of airspeed and smooth and restrained operation of the controls to reduce drag from deflected control surfaces. In zero wind conditions, L/D will equal distance traveled divided by altitude lost. Achieving the maximum distance for altitude lost in wind conditions requires further modification of the best airspeed, as does alternating cruising and thermaling. To achieve high speed across country, glider pilots anticipating strong thermals often load their gliders (sailplanes) with water ballast: the increased wing loading means optimum glide ratio at greater airspeed, but at the cost of climbing more slowly in thermals. As noted below, the maximum L/D is not dependent on weight or wing loading, but with greater wing loading the maximum L/D occurs at a faster airspeed. Also, the faster airspeed means the aircraft will fly at greater Reynolds number and this will usually bring about a lower zero-lift drag coefficient.

== Theory ==
=== Subsonic ===
Mathematically, the maximum lift-to-drag ratio can be estimated as

$$(L/D)_\text{max} = \frac{1}{2} \sqrt{\frac{\pi \varepsilon \text{AR}}{C_{D,0}}},$$

where AR is the aspect ratio, $\varepsilon$ the span efficiency factor, a number less than but close to unity for long, straight-edged wings, and $C_{D,0}$ the zero-lift drag coefficient.

Most importantly, the maximum lift-to-drag ratio is independent of the weight of the aircraft, the area of the wing, or the wing loading.

It can be shown that two main drivers of maximum lift-to-drag ratio for a fixed wing aircraft are wingspan and total wetted area. One method for estimating the zero-lift drag coefficient of an aircraft is the equivalent skin-friction method. For a well designed aircraft, zero-lift drag (or parasite drag) is mostly made up of skin friction drag plus a small percentage of pressure drag caused by flow separation. The method uses the equation

$$C_{D,0} = C_\text{fe} \frac{S_\text{wet}}{S_\text{ref}},$$

where $C_\text{fe}$ is the equivalent skin friction coefficient, $S_\text{wet}$ is the wetted area and $S_\text{ref}$ is the wing reference area. The equivalent skin friction coefficient accounts for both separation drag and skin friction drag and is a fairly consistent value for aircraft types of the same class. Substituting this into the equation for maximum lift-to-drag ratio, along with the equation for aspect ratio ($b^2/S_\text{ref}$), yields the equation
$$(L/D)_\text{max} = \frac{1}{2} \sqrt{\frac{\pi \varepsilon}{C_\text{fe}} \frac{b^2}{S_\text{wet}}},$$
where b is wingspan. The term $b^2/S_\text{wet}$ is known as the wetted aspect ratio. The equation demonstrates the importance of wetted aspect ratio in achieving an aerodynamically efficient design.

=== Supersonic ===
At supersonic speeds L/D values are lower. Concorde had a lift/drag ratio of about 7 at Mach 2, whereas a 747 has about 17 at about mach 0.85.

Dietrich Küchemann developed an empirical relationship for predicting L/D ratio for high Mach numbers:

$$L/D_\text{max} = \frac{4(M + 3)}{M},$$

where M is the Mach number. Windtunnel tests have shown this to be approximately accurate.

== Examples of L/D ratios ==
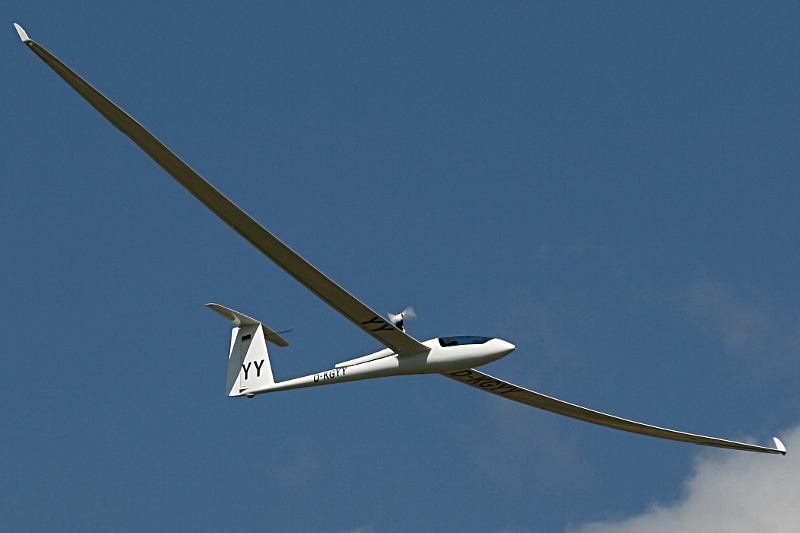
The Eta has the best glide ratio for a sailplane

- House sparrow: 4:1
- Herring gull 10:1
- Common tern 12:1
- Albatross 20:1
- Wright Flyer 8.3:1
- Boeing 747 in cruise 17.7:1.
- Cruising Airbus A380 20:1
- Concorde at takeoff and landing 4:1, increasing to 12:1 at Mach 0.95 and 7.5:1 at Mach 2
- Helicopter at 100 kn (190 km/h) 4.5:1
- Cessna 172 gliding 10.9:1
- Cruising Lockheed U-2 25.6:1
- Rutan Voyager 27:1
- Virgin Atlantic GlobalFlyer 37:1

Computed aerodynamic characteristics
Jetliner	cruise L/D	First flight
Lockheed L1011-100	14.5	Nov 16, 1970
McDonnell Douglas DC-10-40	13.8	Aug 29, 1970
Airbus A300-600	15.2	Oct 28, 1972
McDonnell Douglas MD-11	16.1	Jan 10, 1990
Boeing 767-200ER	16.1	Sep 26, 1981
Airbus A310-300	15.3	Apr 3, 1982
Boeing 747-200	15.3	Feb 9, 1969
Boeing 747-400	15.5	Apr 29, 1988
Boeing 757-200	15.0	Feb 19, 1982
Airbus A320-200	16.3	Feb 22, 1987
Airbus A310-300	18.1	Nov 2, 1992
Airbus A340-200	19.2	Apr 1, 1992
Airbus A340-300	19.1	Oct 25, 1991
Boeing 777-200	19.3	Jun 12, 1994

== See also ==
- Gravity drag—rockets can have an effective lift to drag ratio while maintaining altitude.
- Lift coefficient
- Range (aeronautics) range depends on the lift/drag ratio.
- Thrust specific fuel consumption the lift to drag determines the required thrust to maintain altitude (given the aircraft weight), and the SFC permits calculation of the fuel burn rate.
- Thrust-to-weight ratio
