= Slow flight =

In aviation, slow flight is the region of flight below the maximum lift to drag ratio, where induced drag becomes more significant than parasitic drag. Slow flight can be as slow as 3-5 knots above stall airspeed.

Slow flight is sometimes referred to as the “region of reversed command” or the “back side of the power curve”. This is because in slow flight, more power is required to maintain straight and level flight at lower airspeeds. A very high angle of attack is required to maintain altitude in slow flight.

At these low airspeeds, flight control surfaces begin to lose their effectiveness due to the reduction in airflow over them. Ailerons are the most affected, and roll control is significantly degraded. If ailerons are used in slow flight, there is a possibility that the high wing will stall due to the increased angle of attack, sending the aircraft into a spin. In many modern aircraft, flight envelope protection in the aircraft flight control system prevents this from happening. The rudder remains effective in slow flight, and yaw provided by it can be used to control the bank angle and direction of the aircraft.
