= Zero-lift drag coefficient =

Aerodynamic dimensionaless parameter

In aerodynamics, the zero-lift drag coefficient $C_{D,0}$ is a dimensionless parameter which relates an aircraft's zero-lift drag force to its size, speed, and flying altitude.

Mathematically, zero-lift drag coefficient is defined as $C_{D,0} = C_D - C_{D,i}$, where $C_D$ is the total drag coefficient for a given power, speed, and altitude, and $C_{D,i}$ is the lift-induced drag coefficient at the same conditions. Thus, zero-lift drag coefficient is reflective of parasitic drag which makes it very useful in understanding how "clean" or streamlined an aircraft's aerodynamics are. For example, a Sopwith Camel biplane of World War I which had many wires and bracing struts as well as fixed landing gear, had a zero-lift drag coefficient of approximately 0.0378. Compare a $C_{D,0}$ value of 0.0161 for the streamlined P-51 Mustang of World War II which compares very favorably even with the best modern aircraft.

The drag at zero-lift can be more easily conceptualized as the drag area ($f$) which is simply the product of zero-lift drag coefficient and aircraft's wing area ($C_{D,0} \times S$ where $S$ is the wing area). Parasitic drag experienced by an aircraft with a given drag area is approximately equal to the drag of a flat square disk with the same area which is held perpendicular to the direction of flight. The Sopwith Camel has a drag area of 8.73 sq ft (0.811 m^{2}), compared to 3.80 sq ft (0.353 m^{2}) for the P-51 Mustang. Both aircraft have a similar wing area, again reflecting the Mustang's superior aerodynamics in spite of much larger size. In another comparison with the Camel, a very large but streamlined aircraft such as the Lockheed Constellation has a considerably smaller zero-lift drag coefficient (0.0211 vs. 0.0378) in spite of having a much larger drag area (34.82 ft^{2} vs. 8.73 ft^{2}).

Furthermore, an aircraft's maximum speed is proportional to the cube root of the ratio of power to drag area, that is:

$V_{max}\ \propto\ \sqrt[3]{power/f}$.

== Estimating zero-lift drag ==
As noted earlier, $C_{D,0} = C_D - C_{D,i}$.

The total drag coefficient can be estimated as:

$$C_D = \frac{550 \eta P}{\frac{1}{2} \rho_0 [\sigma S (1.47V)^3]}$$,

where $\eta$ is the propulsive efficiency, P is engine power in horsepower, $\rho_0$ sea-level air density in slugs/cubic foot, $\sigma$ is the atmospheric density ratio for an altitude other than sea level, S is the aircraft's wing area in square feet, and V is the aircraft's speed in miles per hour. Substituting 0.002378 for $\rho_0$, the equation is simplified to:

$$C_D = 1.456 \times 10^5 (\frac{\eta P}{\sigma S V^3})$$.

The induced drag coefficient can be estimated as:

$$C_{D,i} = \frac{C_L^2}{\pi A\!\!\text{R} \epsilon}$$,

where $C_L$ is the lift coefficient, AR is the aspect ratio, and $\epsilon$ is the aircraft's efficiency factor.

Substituting for $C_L$ gives:

$$C_{D,i}=\frac{4.822 \times 10^4}{A\!\!\text{R} \epsilon \sigma^2 V^4} (W/S)^2$$,

where W/S is the wing loading in lb/ft^{2}.
