= Aspect ratio (aeronautics) =

Ratio of an aircraft's wing span to its mean chord

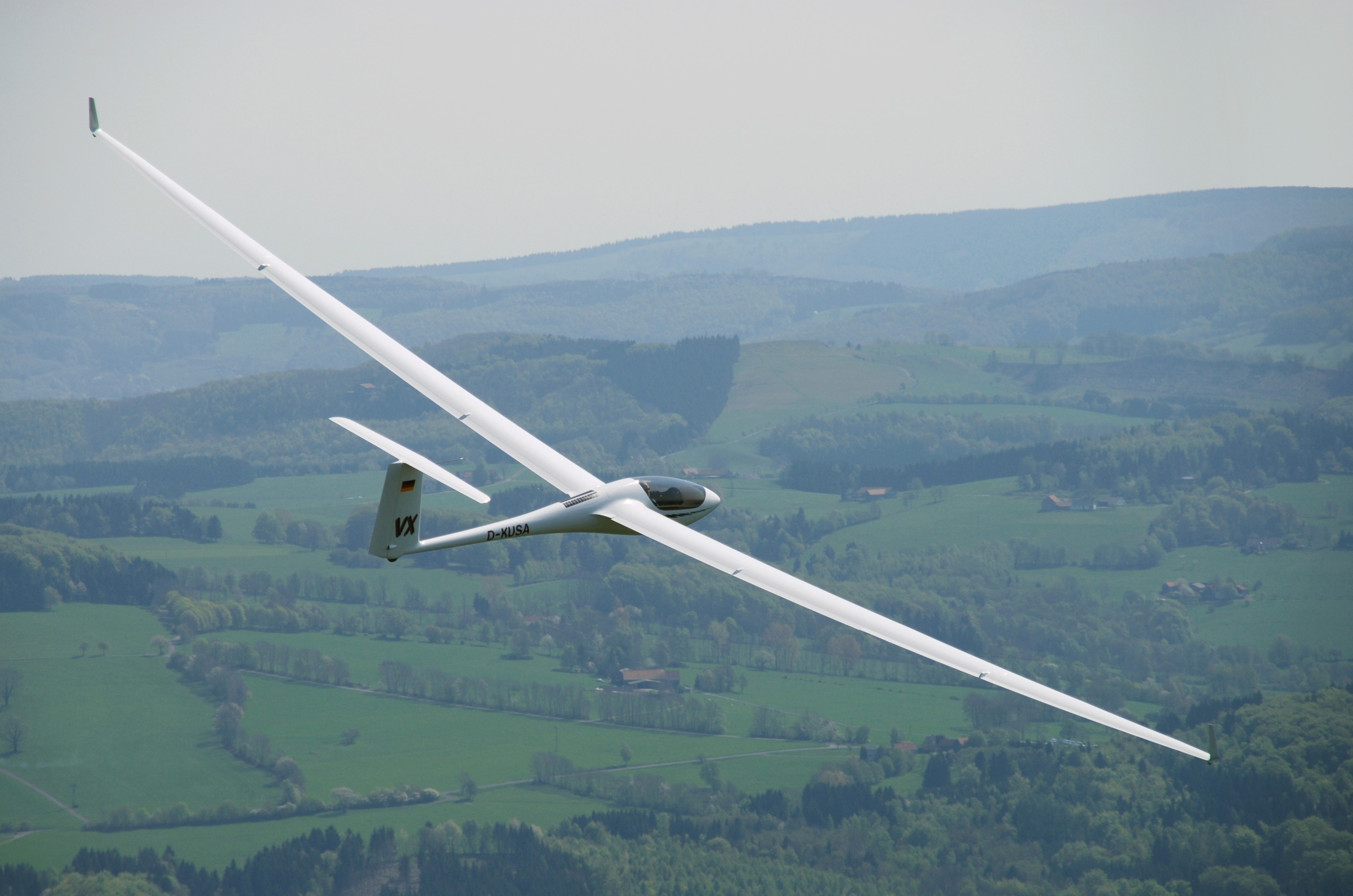
An ASH 31 glider with very high aspect ratio (AR=33.5) and lift-to-drag ratio (L/D=56)

In aeronautics, the aspect ratio of a wing (AR) is a measure of its length relative to its width. Mathematically, it is defined as the square of the wingspan divided by the wing area. For wings of constant chord, this simplifies to the ratio of span to chord. Thus, a long, narrow wing has a high aspect ratio, whereas a short, wide wing has a low aspect ratio.

Aspect ratio and other features of the planform are often used to predict the aerodynamic efficiency of a wing because the lift-to-drag ratio increases with aspect ratio, improving the fuel economy in powered airplanes and the gliding angle of sailplanes.

== Definition ==
The aspect ratio $\text{AR}$ is the ratio of the square of the wingspan $b$ to the projected wing area $S$, which is equal to the ratio of the wingspan $b$ to the standard mean chord $\text{SMC}$:

$\text{AR} \equiv \frac{b^2}{S} = \frac{b}{\text{SMC}}$

== Mechanism ==
As a useful simplification, an airplane in flight can be imagined to affect a cylinder of air with a diameter equal to the wingspan. A large wingspan affects a large cylinder of air, and a small wingspan affects a small cylinder of air. A small air cylinder must be pushed down with a greater power (energy change per unit time) than a large cylinder in order to produce an equal upward force (momentum change per unit time). This is because giving the same momentum change to a smaller mass of air requires giving it a greater velocity change, and a much greater energy change because energy is proportional to the square of the velocity while momentum is only linearly proportional to the velocity. The aft-leaning component of this change in velocity is proportional to the induced drag, which is the force needed to take up that power at that airspeed.

It is important to keep in mind that this is a drastic oversimplification, and an airplane wing affects a very large area around itself.

== In aircraft ==
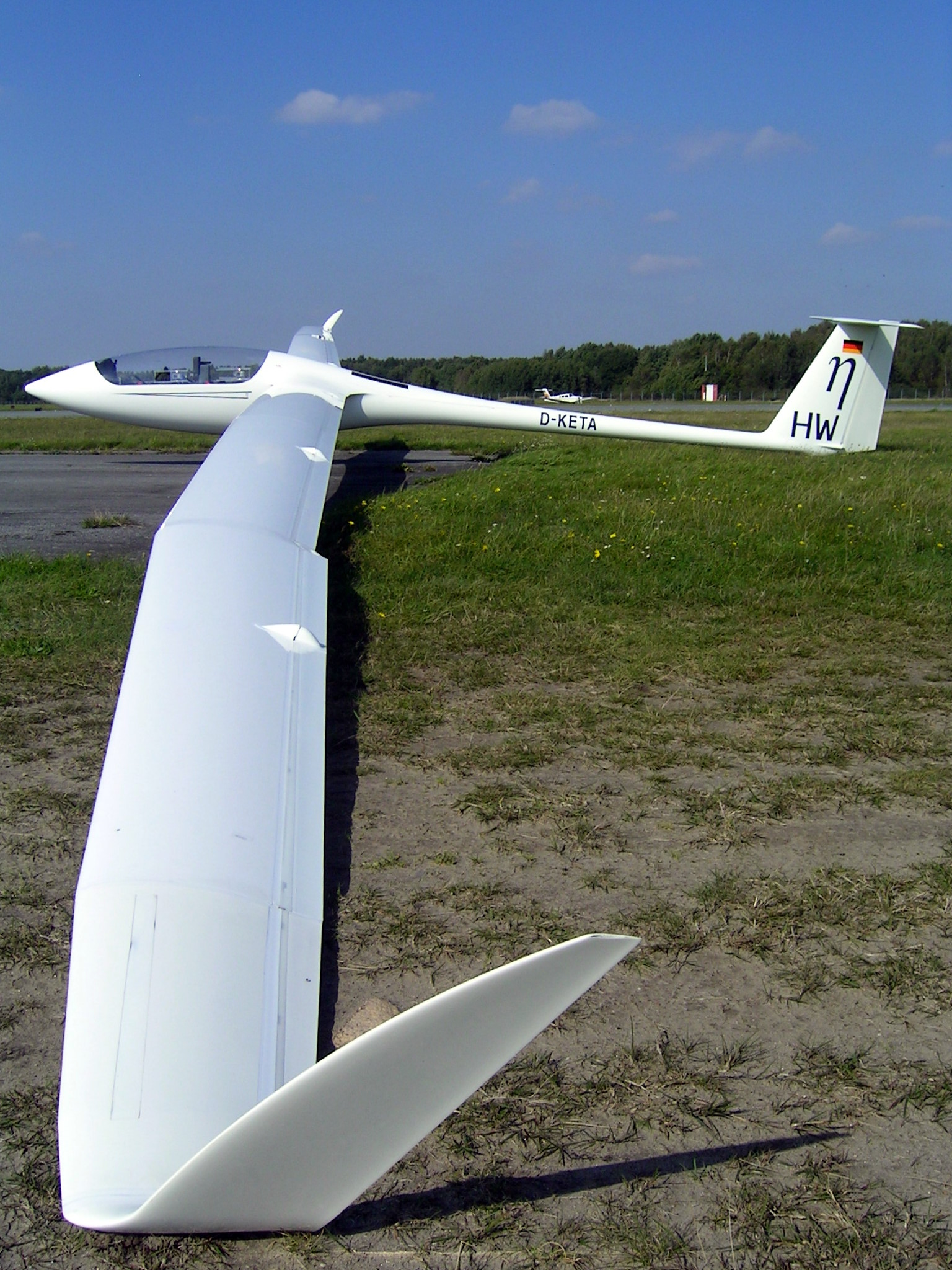
Extremely high aspect ratio wing (AR=51.33) of the Eta motor glider providing a L/D ratio of 70

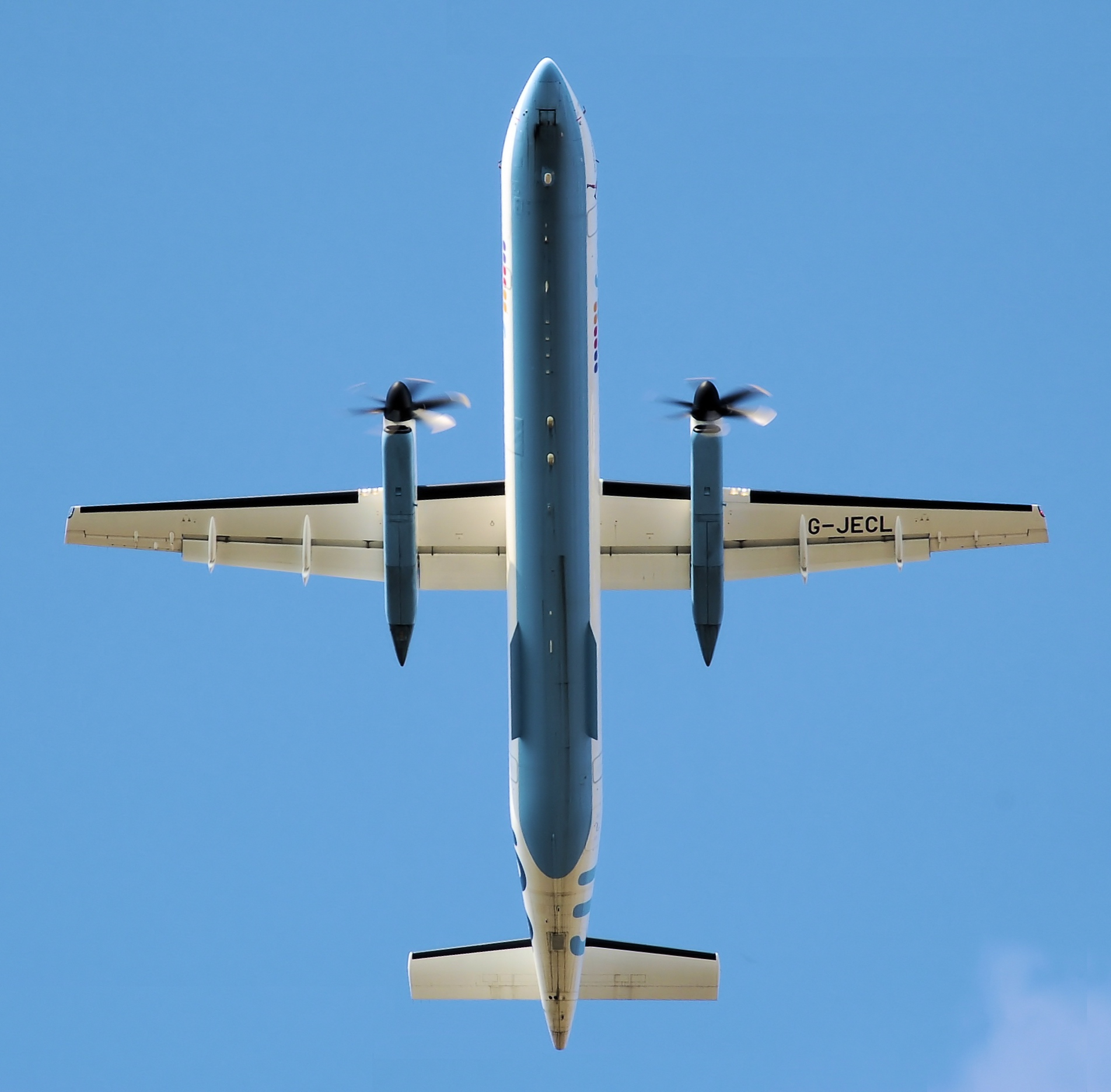
High aspect ratio wing (AR=12.8) of the Bombardier Dash 8 Q400

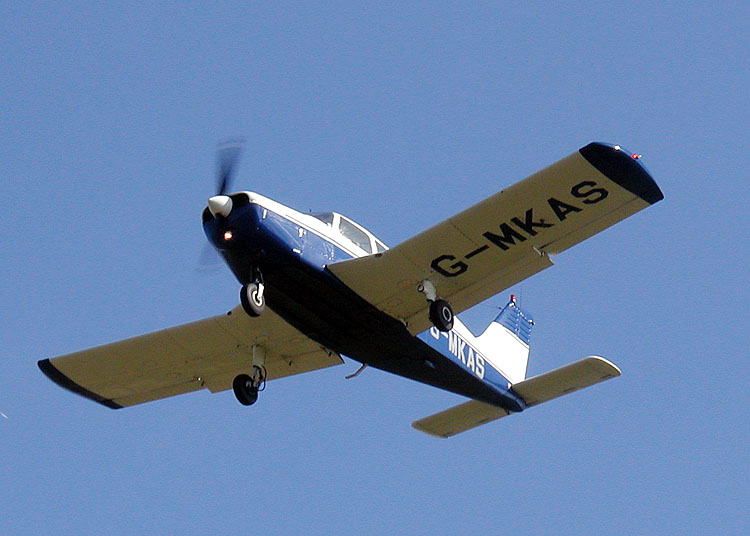
Moderate aspect ratio wing (AR=5.6) of a Piper PA-28 Cherokee

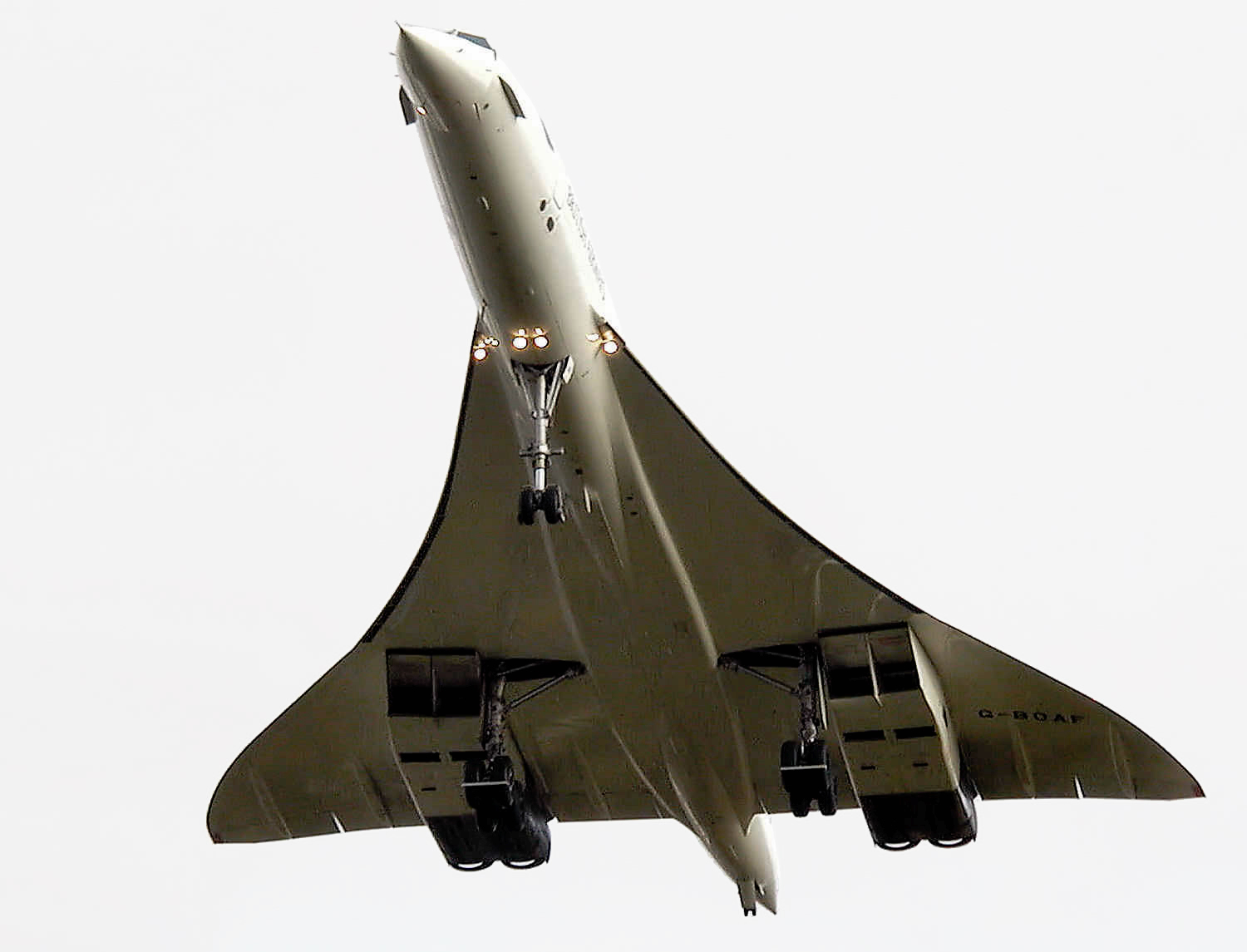
Very low aspect ratio wing (AR=1.55) of the Concorde

Although long, narrow wings with high aspect ratios offer aerodynamic advantages such as improved lift-to-drag ratios, practical considerations limit their use in many aircraft designs:

- Structural: A long wing has higher bending stress for a given load than a short one and therefore requires higher structural-design (architectural and/or material) specifications. Also, longer wings may have some torsion for a given load, and in some applications this torsion is undesirable (e.g. if the warped wing interferes with aileron effect).
- Maneuverability: Low aspect-ratio wings experience higher roll angular acceleration than high aspect-ratio wings because the latter have greater rotational inertia. During steady roll, a longer wing generates higher roll authority due to the increased moment arm of the aileron. Low aspect-ratio wings are usually used on fighter aircraft, not only for the higher roll rates, but especially for longer chord and thinner airfoils involved in supersonic flight.
- Parasitic drag: While high aspect wings create less induced drag, they have greater parasitic drag (drag due to shape, frontal area, and surface friction). This is because, for an equal wing area, the average chord (length in the direction of wind travel over the wing) is smaller. Due to the effects of Reynolds number, the value of the section drag coefficient is an inverse logarithmic function of the characteristic length of the surface, which means that, even if two wings of the same area are flying at equal speeds and equal angles of attack, the section drag coefficient is slightly higher on the wing with the smaller chord. However, this variation is very small when compared to the variation in induced drag with changing wingspan.
  For example, the section drag coefficient $c_d\;$ of a NACA 23012 airfoil (at typical lift coefficients) is inversely proportional to chord length to the power 0.129:
  $c_d \varpropto \frac{1}{(\text{chord})^{0.129}}.$

A 20% increase in chord length would decrease the section drag coefficient by 2.38%.

- Practicality: low aspect ratios have a greater useful internal volume, since the maximum thickness is greater, which can be used to house the fuel tanks, retractable landing gear and other systems.
- Airfield size: Airfields, hangars, and other ground equipment define a maximum wingspan, which cannot be exceeded. To generate enough lift at a given wingspan, the aircraft designer must increase wing area by lengthening the chord, thus lowering the aspect ratio. This limits the Airbus A380 to 80m wide with an aspect ratio of 7.8, while the Boeing 787 or Airbus A350 have an aspect ratio of 9.5, influencing flight economy.

=== Variable aspect ratio ===
Aircraft which approach or exceed the speed of sound sometimes incorporate variable-sweep wings. These wings give a high aspect ratio when unswept and a low aspect ratio at maximum sweep.

At subsonic speeds, swept wings are less efficient than unswept high aspect-ratio wings. At transonic and supersonic speeds, shock waves form on the wing surfaces, producing wave drag proportional to the wingspan. Longer spans therefore create excessive wave drag at high speeds, making sweep desirable for transonic and supersonic flight. Thus a long span, valuable at low speeds, causes excessive drag at transonic and supersonic speeds.

By varying the sweep the wing can be optimised for the current flight speed. However, the extra weight and complexity of a moveable wing mean that such a system is not included in many designs.

== Birds and bats ==
The aspect ratios of birds' and bats' wings vary considerably. Birds that fly long distances or spend long periods soaring such as albatrosses and eagles often have wings of high aspect ratio. By contrast, birds which require good maneuverability, such as the Eurasian sparrowhawk, have wings of low aspect ratio.

== Details ==
For a constant-chord wing of chord c and span b, the aspect ratio is given by:

$$AR = {b\over c}$$

If the wing is swept, c is measured parallel to the direction of forward flight.

For most wings the length of the chord is not a constant but varies along the wing, so the aspect ratio AR is defined as the square of the wingspan b divided by the wing area S. In symbols,

$$AR = {b^2 \over S}$$.

For such a wing with varying chord, the standard mean chord SMC is defined as

$$SMC = {S\over b} = {b\over AR}$$

The performance of aspect ratio AR related to the lift-to-drag ratio and wingtip vortices is illustrated in the formula used to calculate the drag coefficient of an aircraft $C_d\;$

$$C_D =C_{D0} + \frac{(C_L)^2}{\pi e AR}$$

where

$C_D\;$	is the aircraft drag coefficient
$C_{D0}\;$	is the aircraft zero-lift drag coefficient,
$C_L\;$	is the aircraft lift coefficient,
$\pi\;$	is the circumference-to-diameter ratio of a circle, pi,
$e\;$	is the Oswald efficiency number
$AR$	is the aspect ratio.

=== Wetted aspect ratio ===
The wetted aspect ratio accounts for the entire wetted surface area of the airframe, $S_w$, rather than just the wing area. It provides a more comprehensive measure of aerodynamic efficiency for comparing aircraft with very different wing planforms. It is defined as:

$$\mathit{AR}_{\mathrm{wet}} = {b^2 \over S_w}$$

where $b$ is span and $S_w$ is the wetted surface.

Illustrative examples are provided by the Boeing B-47 and Avro Vulcan. Both aircraft have very similar performance although they are radically different. The B-47 has a high aspect ratio wing, while the Avro Vulcan has a low aspect ratio wing. They have, however, a very similar wetted aspect ratio.

== See also ==
- Wing configuration
- Boeing Truss-Braced Wing
- Airbus: Wing of Tomorrow
