= NFD =

NFD may refer to:

- Nephrogenic fibrosing dermopathy, a medical condition
- Newfoundland dollar, the currency of the Dominion of Newfoundland from 1865 to 1949.
- Nifedipine
- Northfield railway station, England (National Rail code: NFD)
- Northern Frontier District, Kenya
- Normalization Form Canonical Decomposition, one of the forms of Unicode normalization
- Nürnberger Flugdienst, one of the regional airlines that merged to form Eurowings
