= Flight 108 =

Flight 108 may refer to:

Listed chronologically

- Canadian Pacific Air Lines Flight 108, destroyed by a bomb on 9 September 1949
- Nürnberger Flugdienst Flight 108, crashed on 8 February 1988

== See also ==
- STS-108, a successful Space Shuttle mission in December 2001
