= Conyca Geodrone =

Type of aircraft

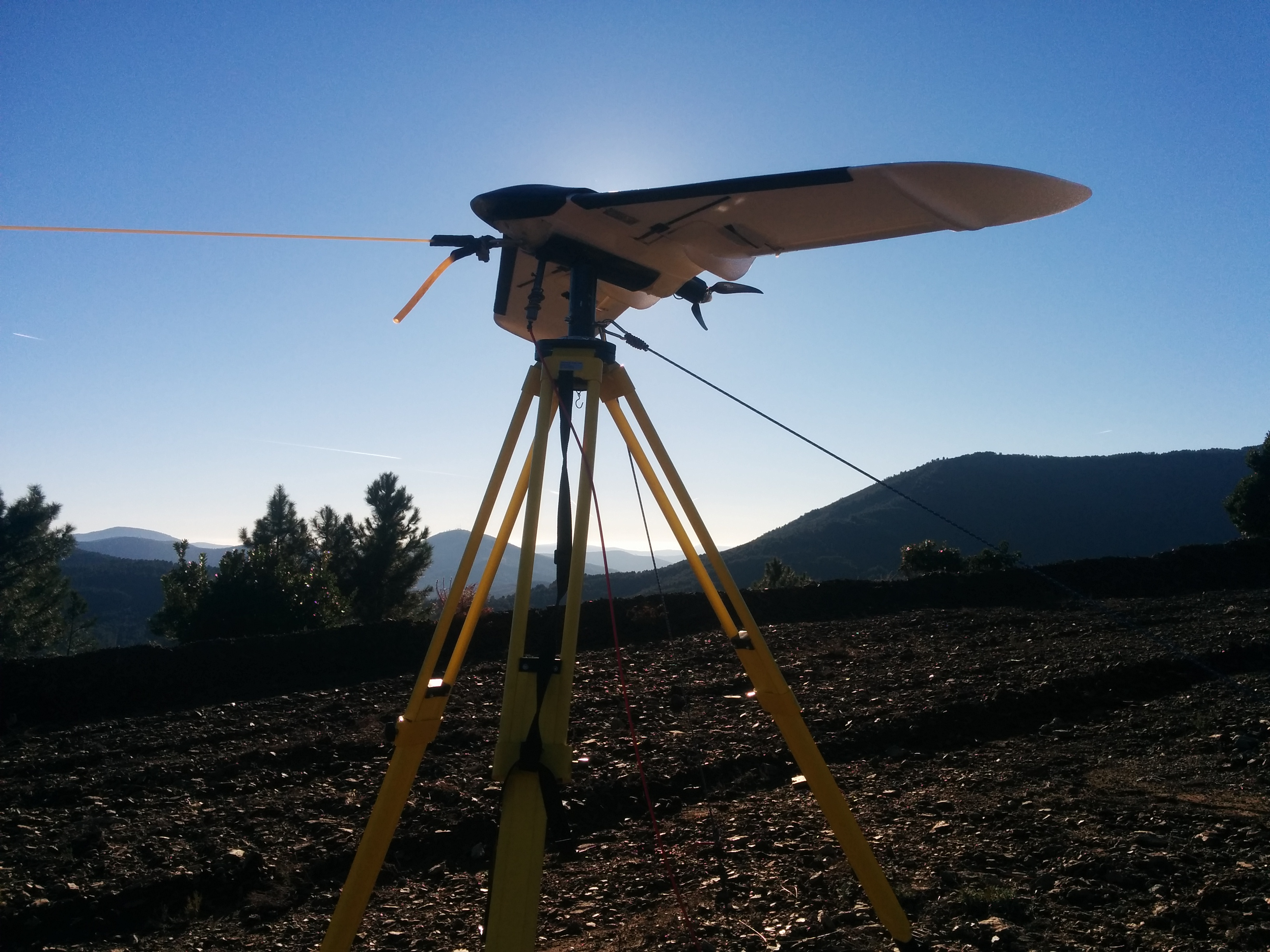
Geodrone working on The mestas. Doing the 3d terrain model of a mountain road.

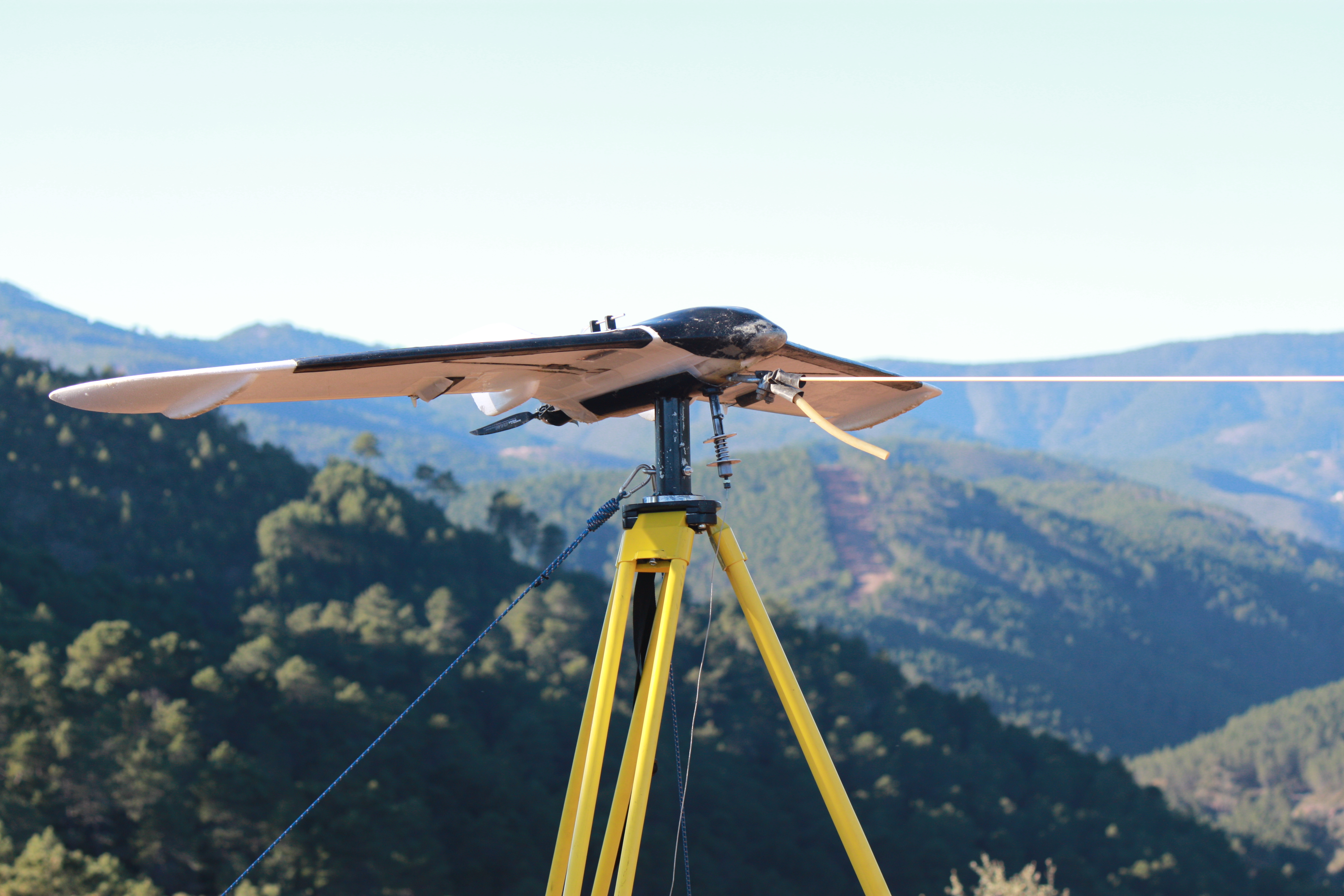
Geodrone working on The mestas. Doing the 3d terrain model of a mountain road.

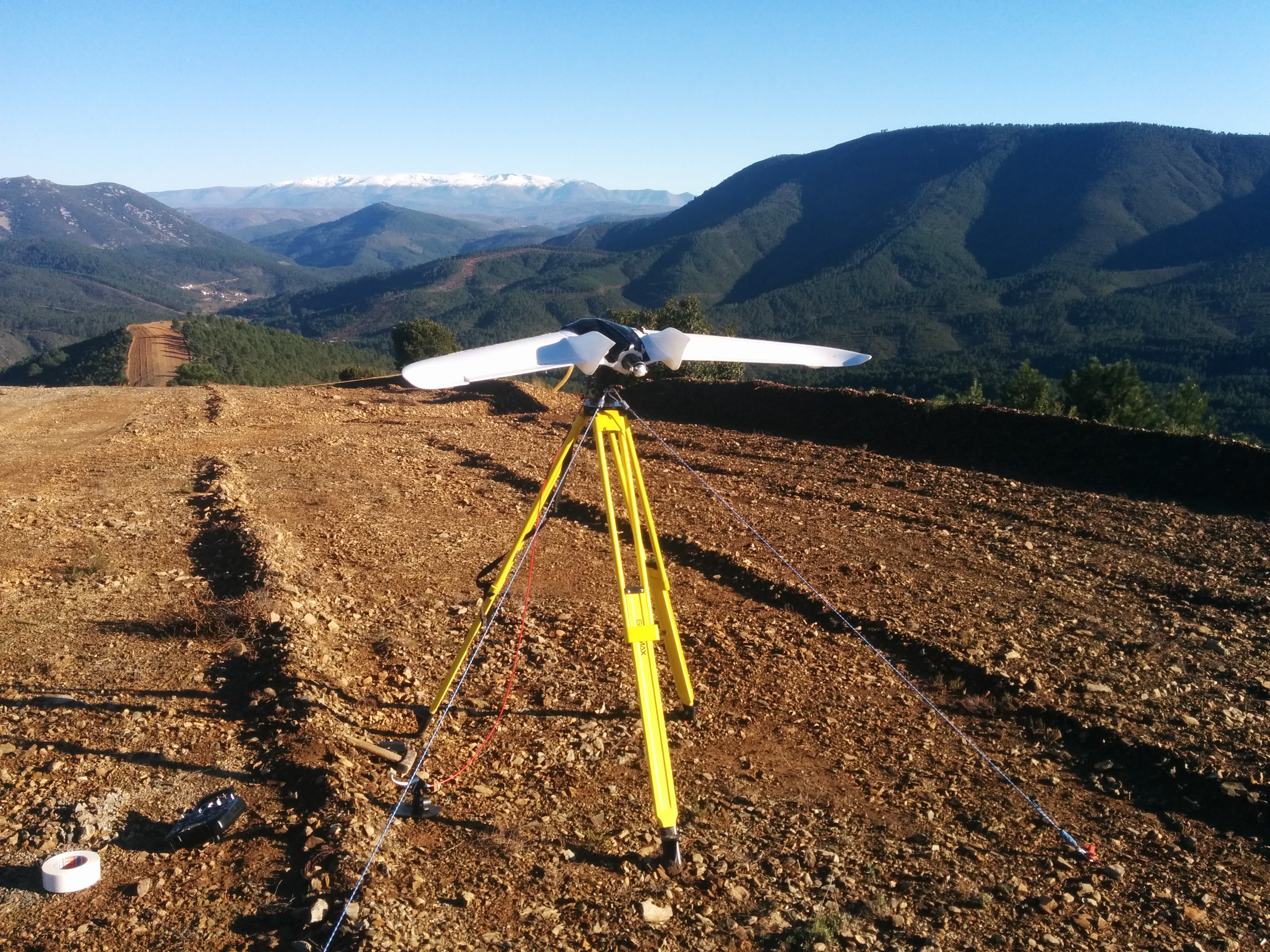
Geodrone working on The mestas. Doing the 3d terrain model of a mountain road.

The Conyca Geodrome is a 1.5m fixed-wing drone that specializes in topography and photogrammetric applications. It has all the legal requirements to operate in Spain. The system has totally autonomous take-off and landing operations, can present 3D terrain models with 4 cm resolution accuracy at 100 m height, and can take orthophotos. Although this system has been orientated to topography, there are surveillance and precision agriculture versions than can use infrared and hyperspectral cameras.

== Specifications ==
- MTOW: 2000 g
- Maximum Payload: 600 g
- Cruise speed: 20 m/s
- Max speed: 30 m/s
- Autonomy: 1h
- Max area: 130 Ha
- Wingspan: 1500 mm
- Power: 625 W
- Processor: 32-bit ARM Cortex® M4 Processor
