= Vortex lattice method =

Numerical method used in computational fluid dynamics

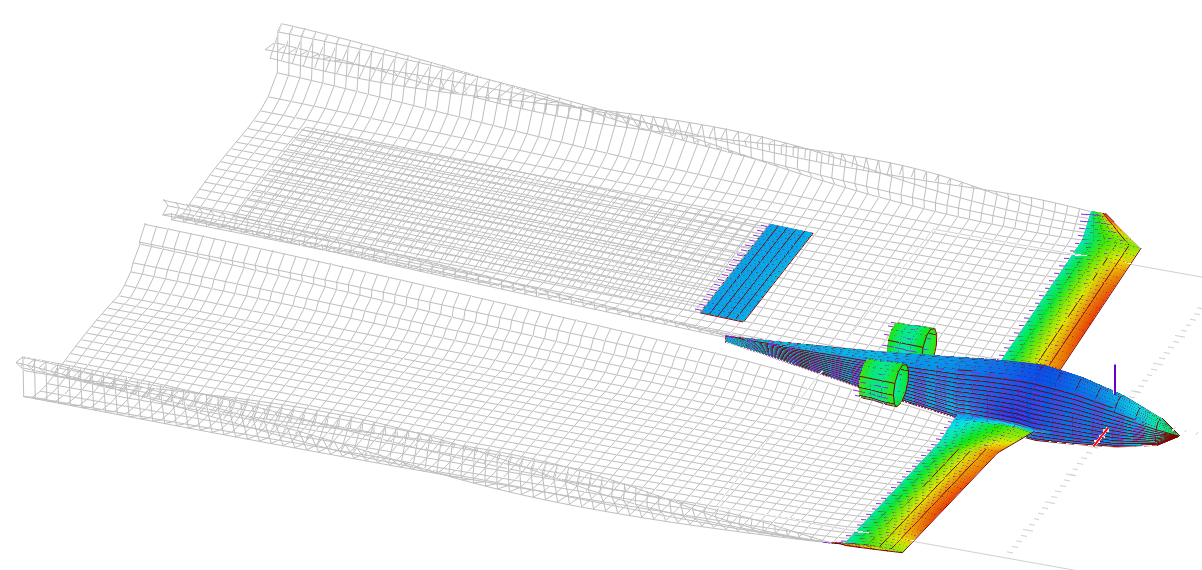
Simulation of an airplane using OpenVOGEL, an open source framework for aerodynamic simulations based in the unsteady vortex lattice method (UVLM).

The vortex lattice method, (VLM), is a numerical method used in computational fluid dynamics, mainly in the early stages of aircraft design and in aerodynamic education at university level. The VLM models the lifting surfaces, such as a wing, of an aircraft as an infinitely thin sheet of discrete vortices to compute lift and induced drag. The influence of the thickness and viscosity is neglected.

VLMs can compute the flow around a wing with rudimentary geometrical definition. For a rectangular wing it is enough to know the span and chord. On the other side of the spectrum, they can describe the flow around a fairly complex aircraft geometry (with multiple lifting surfaces with taper, kinks, twist, camber, trailing edge control surfaces and many other geometric features).

By simulating the flow field, one can extract the pressure distribution or as in the case of the VLM, the force distribution, around the simulated body. This knowledge is then used to compute the aerodynamic coefficients and their derivatives that are important for assessing the aircraft's handling qualities in the conceptual design phase. With an initial estimate of the pressure distribution on the wing, the structural designers can start designing the load-bearing parts of the wings, fin and tailplane and other lifting surfaces. Additionally, while the VLM cannot compute the viscous drag, the induced drag stemming from the production of lift can be estimated. Hence as the drag must be balanced with the thrust in the cruise configuration, the propulsion group can also get important data from the VLM simulation.

== Historical background ==
John DeYoung provides a background history of the VLM in the NASA Langley workshop documentation SP-405.

The VLM is the extension of Prandtl's lifting-line theory, where the wing of an aircraft is modeled as an infinite number of Horseshoe vortices. The name was coined by V.M. Falkner in his Aeronautical Research Council paper of 1946. The method has since then been developed and refined further by W.P. Jones, H. Schlichting, G.N. Ward and others.

Although the computations needed can be carried out by hand, the VLM benefited from the advent of computers for the large amounts of computations that are required.

Instead of only one horseshoe vortex per wing, as in the lifting-line theory, the VLM utilizes a lattice of horseshoe vortices, as described by Falkner in his first paper on this subject in 1943. The number of vortices used vary with the required pressure distribution resolution, and with required accuracy in the computed aerodynamic coefficients. A typical number of vortices would be around 100 for an entire aircraft wing; an Aeronautical Research Council report by Falkner published in 1949 mentions the use of an "84-vortex lattice before the standardisation of the 126-lattice" (p. 4).

The method is comprehensibly described in all major aerodynamic textbooks, such as Katz & Plotkin, Anderson, Bertin & Smith, Houghton & Carpenter, and Drela.

== Theory ==
The vortex lattice method is built on the theory of ideal flow, also known as potential flow. Ideal flow is a simplification of the real flow experienced in nature, however for many engineering applications this simplified representation has all of the properties that are important from the engineering point of view. This method neglects all viscous effects. Turbulence, dissipation and boundary layers are not resolved at all. However, lift induced drag can be assessed and, taking special care, some stall phenomena can be modeled.

=== Assumptions ===
The following assumptions are made regarding the problem in the vortex lattice method:

- The flow field is incompressible, inviscid and irrotational. However, small-disturbance subsonic compressible flow can be modeled if the general 3D Prandtl-Glauert transformation is incorporated into the method.
- The lifting surfaces are thin. The influence of thickness on aerodynamic forces are neglected.
- The angle of attack and the angle of sideslip are both small, small angle approximation.

=== Method ===
By the above assumptions the flowfield is conservative vector field, which means that there exists a perturbation velocity potential $\varphi$ such that the total velocity vector $\mathbf{V}$ is given by

$\mathbf{V} = \mathbf{V}_\infty + \nabla \varphi$

and that $\varphi$ satisfies Laplace's equation.

Laplace's equation is a second order linear equation, and being so it is subject to the principle of superposition. Which means that if $\varphi_{1}$ and $\varphi_2$ are two solutions of the linear differential equation, then the linear combination $c_1 \varphi_1 + c_2 \varphi_2$ is also a solution for any values of the constants $c_1$ and $c_2$. As Anderson put it "A complicated flow pattern for an irrotational, incompressible flow can be synthesized by adding together a number of elementary flows, which are also irrotational and incompressible.”. Such elementary flows are the point source or sink, the doublet and the vortex line, each being a solution of Laplace's equation. These may be superposed in many ways to create the formation of line sources, vortex sheets and so on. In the Vortex Lattice method, each such elementary flow is the velocity field of a horseshoe vortex with some strength $\Gamma$.

=== Aircraft model ===
All the lifting surfaces of an aircraft are divided into some number of quadrilateral panels, and a horseshoe vortex and a collocation point (or control point) are placed on each panel. The transverse segment of the vortex is at the 1/4 chord position of the panel, while the collocation point is at the 3/4 chord position. The vortex strength $\Gamma$ is to be determined. A normal vector $\mathbf{n}$ is also placed at each collocation point, set normal to the camber surface of the actual lifting surface.

For a problem with $N$ panels, the perturbation velocity at collocation point $i$ is given by summing the contributions of all the horseshoe vortices in terms of an aerodynamic influence coefficient (AIC) matrix $\mathbf{w}_{ij}$.

$\nabla \varphi_i = \sum_{j=1}^N \mathbf{w}_{ij} \Gamma_j$

The freestream velocity vector is given in terms of the freestream speed $V_\infty$ and the angles of attack and sideslip, $\alpha, \beta$.

$$\mathbf{V}_\infty = V_\infty
\begin{bmatrix}
\cos\alpha \cos\beta \\
-\sin\beta \\
\sin\alpha \cos\beta
\end{bmatrix}$$

A Neumann boundary condition is applied at each collocation point, which prescribes that the normal velocity across the camber surface is zero. Alternate implementations may also use the Dirichlet boundary condition directly on the velocity potential.

$\mathbf{v}_i \cdot \mathbf{n}_i = \left( \mathbf{V}_\infty + \sum_{j=1}^N \mathbf{w}_{ij} \Gamma_j \right) \cdot \mathbf{n}_i = 0$

This is also known as the flow tangency condition. By evaluating the dot products above the following system of equations results. The new normalwash AIC matrix is $a_{ij} = \mathbf{w}_{ij} \cdot \mathbf{n}_i$, and the right hand side is formed by the freestream speed and the two aerodynamic angles $b_i = V_\infty [-\cos\alpha \cos\beta , \sin\beta , -\sin\alpha \cos\beta] \cdot \mathbf{n}_i$

$$\begin{bmatrix}
a_{11} & a_{12} & \cdots & a_{1N}\\
a_{21} & \ddots &   & \vdots \\
\vdots &   & \ddots & \vdots \\
a_{N1} & \cdots & \cdots &  a_{NN} \end{bmatrix}
\begin{bmatrix}
\Gamma_{1} \\
\Gamma_{2} \\
\vdots \\
\Gamma_{N} \end{bmatrix}=
\begin{bmatrix}
b_{1} \\
b_{2} \\
\vdots \\
b_{N} \end{bmatrix}$$

This system of equations is solved for all the vortex strengths $\Gamma_i$. The total force vector $\mathbf{F}$ and total moment vector $\mathbf{M}$ about the origin are then computed by summing the contributions of all the forces $\mathbf{F}_i$ on all the individual horseshoe vortices, with $\rho$ being the fluid density.

$\mathbf{F}_i=\rho \Gamma_i ( \mathbf{V}_{\infty}+ \mathbf{v}_i ) \times \mathbf{l}_i$

$\mathbf{F} = \sum_{i=1}^N \mathbf{F}_i$

$\mathbf{M} = \sum_{i=1}^N \mathbf{F}_i \times \mathbf{r}_i$

Here, $\mathbf{l}_i$ is the vortex's transverse segment vector, and $\mathbf{v}_i$ is the perturbation velocity at this segment's center location $\mathbf{r}_i$ (not at the collocation point).

The lift and induced drag are obtained from the $x,y,z$ components of the total force vector $\mathbf{F}$. For the case of zero sideslip these are given by

$\begin{array}{rcl} D_i & = & \;\;F_x \cos\alpha + F_z \sin\alpha \\ L & = & \! -F_x \sin\alpha + F_z \cos\alpha \end{array}$

=== Extension to the Dynamic Case ===
The preliminary design of airplanes requires unsteady aerodynamic models, usually written in the frequency domain for aeroelastic analyses. Commonly used is the doublet lattice method (DLM), where the wing system is subdivided into panels. Each panel has a line of doublets of acceleration potential in the first-quarter line, similarly of what is usually done in the VLM. Each panel has a load point where the lifting force is assumed applied and a control point where the aeroelastic boundary condition is enforced. The DLM evaluated at frequency zero is usually obtained with a vortex lattice formulation.

== Sources ==
- NASA, Vortex-lattice utilization. NASA SP-405, NASA-Langley, Washington, 1976.
- Prandtl. L, Applications of modern hydrodynamics to aeronautics, NACA-TR-116, NASA, 1923.
- Falkner. V.M., The Accuracy of Calculations Based on Vortex Lattice Theory, Rep. No. 9621, British A.R.C., 1946.
- J. Katz, A. Plotkin, Low-Speed Aerodynamics, 2nd ed., Cambridge University Press, Cambridge, 2001.
- J.D. Anderson Jr, Fundamentals of aerodynamics, 2nd ed., McGraw-Hill Inc, 1991.
- J.J. Bertin, M.L. Smith, Aerodynamics for Engineers, 3rd ed., Prentice Hall, New Jersey, 1998.
- E.L. Houghton, P.W. Carpenter, Aerodynamics for Engineering Students, 4th ed., Edward Arnold, London, 1993.
- Lamar, J. E., Herbert, H. E., Production version of the extended NASA-Langley vortex lattice FORTRAN computer program. Volume 1: User's guide, NASA-TM-83303, NASA, 1982
- Lamar, J. E., Herbert, H. E., Production version of the extended NASA-Langley vortex lattice FORTRAN computer program. Volume 2: Source code, NASA-TM-83304, NASA, 1982
- Melin, Thomas, A Vortex Lattice MATLAB Implementation for Linear Aerodynamic Wing Applications, Royal Institute of Technology (KTH), Sweden, December, 2000
- M. Drela, Flight Vehicle Aerodynamics, MIT Press, Cambridge, MA, 2014.
