= Lifting-line theory =

Mathematical model to quantify lift

The Lanchester–Prandtl lifting-line theory is a mathematical model in aerodynamics that predicts lift distribution over a three-dimensional wing from the wing's geometry. The theory was expressed independently by Frederick W. Lanchester in 1907, and by Ludwig Prandtl in 1918–1919 after working with Albert Betz and Max Munk. In this model, the vortex bound to the wing develops along the whole wingspan because it is shed as a vortex-sheet from the trailing edge, rather than just as a single vortex from the wing-tips.

== Introduction ==
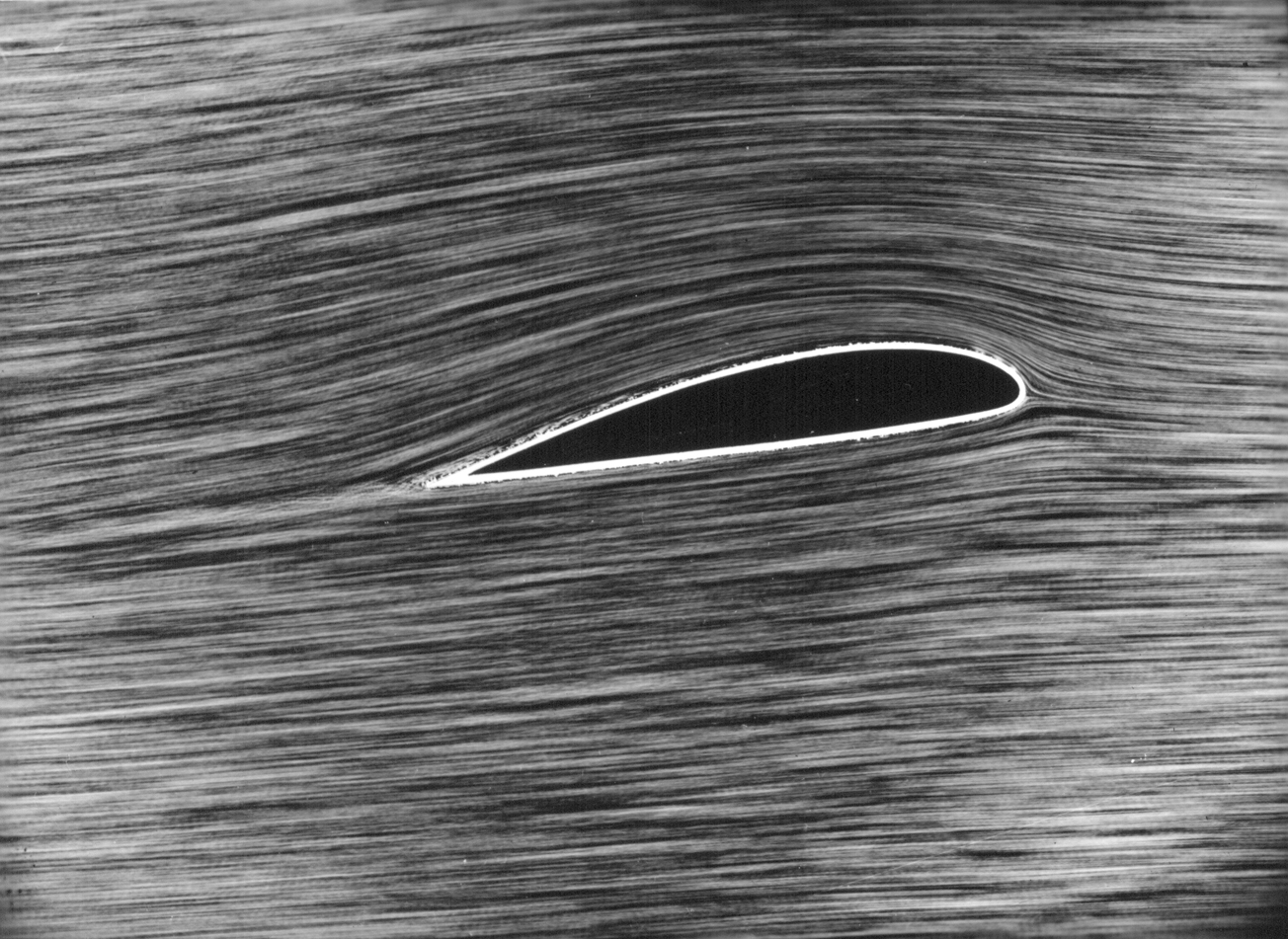
Airfoils in two dimensions are easier to understand, but they do not directly map to three-dimensional finite wings

It is difficult to predict analytically the overall amount of lift that a wing of given geometry will generate. When analyzing a three-dimensional finite wing, a traditional approach slices the wing into cross-sections and analyzes each cross-section independently as a wing in a two-dimensional world. Each of these slices is called an airfoil, and it is easier to understand an airfoil than a complete three-dimensional wing.

One might expect that understanding the full wing simply involves adding up the independently calculated forces from each airfoil segment. However, this approximation is grossly incorrect: on a real wing, the lift from each infinitesimal wing section is strongly affected by the airflow over neighboring wing sections. Lifting-line theory corrects some of the errors in the naive two-dimensional approach by including some interactions between the wing slices.

An unrealistic lift distribution that neglects three-dimensional effects

The observed lift distribution on a (finite) trapezoidal wing

== Principle and derivation ==
Lifting line theory supposes wings that are long and thin with negligible fuselage, akin to a thin bar (the eponymous "lifting line") of span 2s driven through the fluid. From the Kutta–Joukowski theorem, the lift L(y) on a 2-dimensional segment of the wing at distance y from the fuselage is proportional to the circulation Γ(y) about the bar at y. When the aircraft is stationary on the ground, these circulations are all equal, but when the craft is in motion, they vary with y. By Helmholtz's theorems, the generation of spatially-varying circulation must correspond to shedding an equal-strength vortex filament downstream from the wing.

The lift distribution over a wing can be modeled with the concept of circulation

A vortex is shed downstream for every span-wise change in lift

In the lifting line theory, the resulting vortex line is presumed to remain bound to the wing, so that it changes the effective vertical angle of the incoming freestream air.

The shed vortex can be modeled as a vertical velocity distribution

The upwash and downwash induced by the shed vortex can be computed at each neighbor segment.

The vertical motion induced by a vortex line of strength γ on air a distance r away is γ/4πr, so that the entire vortex system induces a freestream vertical motion at position y of
$$w(y)=\int_{-s}^s{\frac{d\Gamma(\tilde{y})}{4\pi(y-\tilde{y})}},$$
where the integral is understood in the sense of a Cauchy principal value. This flow changes the effective angle of attack at y; if the circulation response of the airfoils comprising the wing are understood over a range of attack angles, then one can develop an integral equation to determine Γ(y).

Formally, there is some angle of orientation such that the airfoil at position y develops no lift. For airstreams of velocity V oriented at an angle α relative to the liftless angle, the airfoil will develop some circulation V⋅C(y,α); for small α, Taylor expansion approximates that circulation as V⋅∂C/∂α(y,0)⋅α. If the airfoil is ideal and has chord c(y), then theory predicts that
$$C(y,\alpha)=2\pi c(y)\sin(\alpha)\text{,}$$
but real airfoils may be less efficient.

Suppose the freestream flow attacks the airfoil at position y at angle α(y) (relative to the liftless angle for the airfoil at position y — thus a uniform flow across a wing may still have varying α(y)). By the small-angle approximation, the effective angle of attack at y of the combined freestream and vortex system is α(y)+w(y)/V. Combining the above formulae,

$$\begin{align} \Gamma(y)&=V\cdot\frac{\partial C}{\partial\alpha}(y,0)\left(\alpha(y)+\frac{w(y)}{V}\right) \\ &=\partial_\alpha C(y,0)\left(V\alpha(y)+\frac{1}{4\pi}\int_{-s}^s{\frac{\Gamma'(\tilde{y})\,dy}{y-\tilde{y}}}\right)\text{.} \end{align}$$	1

All the quantities in this equation except V and Γ are geometric properties of the wing, and so an engineer can (in principle) solve for Γ(y) given a fixed V. As in the derivation of thin-airfoil theory, a common approach is to expand Γ as a Fourier series along the wing, and then keep only the first few terms.

Once the velocity V, circulation Γ, and fluid density ρ are known, the lift generated by the wing is assumed to be the net lift produced by each airfoil with the prescribed circulation...
$$L=\rho V\int_{-s}^s{\Gamma(y)\,dy}$$
...and the drag is likewise the total across airfoils:
$$D=\rho V\int_{-s}^s{\Gamma(y)\alpha(y)\,dy}\text{.}$$
From these quantities and the aspect ratio A‍R, the span efficiency factor
$$e=\frac{1}{\pi\mathrm{A\!R}}\cdot\frac{L^2}{\rho VD}$$
may be computed.

== Effects of control inputs ==
Control surface deflection changes the shape of each airfoil slice, which can produce a different angle-of-no-lift for that airfoil, as well as a different angle-of-attack response. These do not require substantial modification to the theory, only changing ∂_{α}C(y,0) and α(y) in (1). However, a body with rapidly moving wings, such as a rolling aircraft or flapping bird, experiences a vertical flow across the wing due to the wing's change in orientation, which appears as a missing term in the theory.

=== Rolling wings ===
When the aircraft is rolling at rate p about the fuselage, an airfoil at (signed) position y experiences a vertical airflow at rate py, which correspondingly adds py/V to the effective angle of attack. Thus (1) becomes:
$$\Gamma(y)=\partial_\alpha C(y,0)\left(V\alpha(y)+py+\frac{1}{4\pi}\int_{-s}^s{\frac{\Gamma'(\tilde{y})\,dy}{y-\tilde{y}}}\right)\text{,}$$
which correspondingly modifies both the lift and the induced drag. This "drag force" comprises the main production of thrust for flapping wings.

== Elliptical wings ==
The efficiency e is theoretically optimized in an elliptical wing with no twist, in which
$$\begin{align}
y&=s\cos\theta \\
c(y)&=\mathrm{A\!R}\,s\sin\theta\text{,}
\end{align}$$
where θ is an alternate parameterization of station along the wing. For such a wing,
$$e = 1\text{,}$$
which yields the equation for the elliptic induced drag coefficient:
$$C_{D_{induced}} = \frac{C_L^2}{\pi A\!R}$$
According to lifting-line theory, any wing planform can achieve the same efficiency through twist (a position-varying increase in pitch) relative to the fuselage.

== Useful approximations ==
A useful approximation for the 3D lift coefficient for elliptical circulation distribution is
$$\ C_{L} = \partial_\alpha C(0,0)\left(1+\frac{2}{\mathrm{A\!R}}\right)^{-1}\alpha$$
Note that this equation becomes the thin airfoil equation if AR goes to infinity.

== Limitations ==
The lifting line theory does not take into account compression of the air by the wings, viscous flow within the fuselage's boundary layer, or wing shapes other than the long, straight and thin, such as swept or low–aspect-ratio wings. The theory also presupposes that flow around the wings is in equilibrium, and does not address bodies that are quickly accelerated relative to the freestream air.

== See also ==
- Horseshoe vortex
- Kutta condition
- Thin airfoil theory
- Vortex lattice method
- Euler equations (fluid dynamics)
