= Nürnberger Flugdienst Flight 108 =

1988 aviation accident in Germany

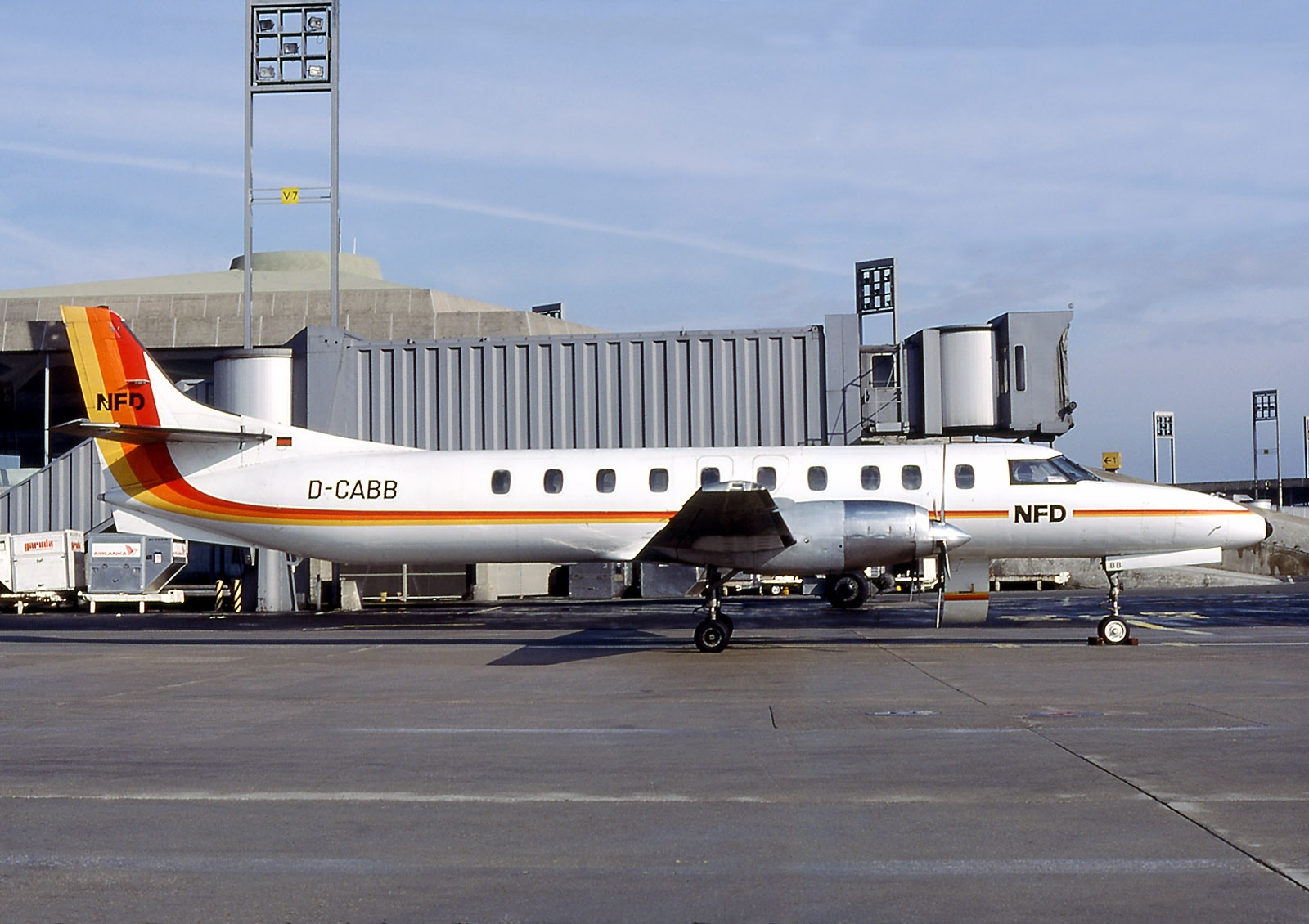
- D-CABB, the aircraft involved in the accident, photographed in 1985

Accident
- Date: February 8, 1988
- Summary: Struck by lightning, spatial disorientation, in-flight breakup
- Site: 2.1 km (1.3 mi) north of Kettwig; 51°22′38″N 6°54′58″E

Aircraft
- Aircraft type: Swearingen SA-227AC Metroliner III
- Operator: Nürnberger Flugdienst
- IATA flight No.: NS108
- ICAO flight No.: NFD108
- Call sign: Flamingo 108
- Registration: D-CABB
- Flight origin: Hannover Airport, West Germany
- Destination: Düsseldorf Airport, West Germany
- Occupants: 21
- Passengers: 19
- Crew: 2
- Fatalities: 21
- Survivors: 0

On the morning of 8 February 1988, Nürnberger Flugdienst Flight 108, a scheduled regional passenger flight from Hannover Airport to Düsseldorf Airport, crashed near Essen, West Germany, with the loss of all 19 passengers and two crew members on board. Shortly before sunrise, the Swearingen SA-227AC Metroliner III operating the flight lost all electrical power after a lightning strike while flying through a cumulonimbus cloud on approach to the airport. Spatially disoriented, the pilots did not realize the aircraft was descending towards the ground until they got below the cloud cover. Witnesses described the aircraft flying in and out of the clouds until it suffered a structural overload and broke apart over the Ruhr River. It is the deadliest aviation accident involving the Swearingen Fairchild Metroliner.

== Background ==
=== Aircraft ===
The aircraft involved in the accident was a 19-seater Swearingen SA227-AC Metroliner III. Manufactured in 1982 and registered as D-CABB, it was delivered to NFD in May 1982. At the time of the accident, the aircraft had accumulated a total of almost 9,200 flight hours. It was powered by two Garrett TPE331-11U-601G turboprop engines.

In accordance with the Minimum Equipment List (MEL), D-CABB was equipped with a third artificial horizon, a weather radar, and an autopilot. However, it was not equipped with an emergency power source in the event of an electrical system failure, as it was not required under the airworthiness regulations.

=== Passengers and crew ===
Flight 108 was at full capacity with 19 passengers and two pilots on board.

- The captain of the flight was 36-year-old Ralf Borsdorf. He was hired by NFD in October 1987, and had been type rated on both the SA226 and SA227 variants of the Metroliner. He had a total flying experience of nearly 2,500 flight hours, including 277 hours as a commander on the Metroliner III. Borsdorf began his training on the Metroliner III in October 1987 until November of that same year. His simulator training included emergency procedures for dealing with electrical issues, such as bus switchovers and generator and battery failure exercises. Flight 108 was the captain’s first flight of the day.
- The first officer was 28-year-old Sibylle Heilmann. She was hired in July 1986 by NFD, a year before the captain's employment, and had a type rating on both the SA226 and SA227 Metroliners. She had accumulated a total flying experience of over 2,500 hours, with more than 1,300 hours on the Metroliner III. Flight 108 also was Heilmann’s first flight of the day.

=== Weather conditions ===
At 06:00 (Note: All times listed are in Central European Summer Time (UTC+2)), Captain Borsdorf and First Officer Heilmann arrived at Hannover Airport for the flight preparations. During the weather briefing, the crew learned that a cold front was moving from west to east. There was a 10% chance of heavy thunderstorms over Düsseldorf Airport from 05:00 to 14:00, and moderate-to-severe turbulence was forecast below 5,000 ft (1,500 m). Weather reports were obtained from the Düsseldorf Aviation Weather Station and the Essen Weather Office. The latter reported that the lightning-filled thunderstorm activity lasted from 07:40 to 08:03 local time. The wind conditions varied considerably, with speeds gusting from 15 to 29 knots. Due to the heavy showers, the visibility decreased from 10 km to just 1-2 km, and the cloud base dropped to around 800 ft (240 m) and 500 ft (150 m).

From 22:00 to 06:30, the crew couldn’t get weather advice in Hannover, as the weather station was not staffed with a weather advisor during the time period. Although it was possible to get consultation from Hamburg's weather station, the crew of Flight 108 did not do so.

== Accident ==
At 06:30, the aircraft was refueled and de-iced. At 07:15, Flight 108 took off from Hannover Airport with 19 passengers and two pilots on board, 15 minutes behind schedule. Captain Borsdorf was the pilot in command, while First Officer Heilmann was the pilot monitoring. For the next 24 minutes, the plane climbed to a cruising altitude of 14,000 ft (4,300 m) without any problems.

In the air, the crew discussed the weather conditions surrounding Düsseldorf Airport. They acknowledged the presence of thunderstorms in the area but believed that the situation wasn't as severe as it seemed. The pilots then tuned in to the Automatic Terminal Information Service, which broadcast that the winds were gusting from 12 knots to 24 knots from a heading of 240°, before initiating their descent at 07:39. After establishing contact with the Dusseldorf director, the flight was cleared to descend to 3,000 ft at 7:47. Two minutes later, the crew of Flight 108 listened as the aircraft ahead of them is told that a preceding aircraft had suffered a lightning strike on approach, but did not perform a go-around as the pilots said it was unnecessary. The director cleared Flight 108 for an ILS approach to runway 24, after which he added "Flamingo 108, the same information for you, the preceding landing experienced a lightning strike on about six miles final." The crew acknowledged this and reported that they are "looking outside."

As they reached the localizer, the crew saw on their weather radar that a thunderstorm was coming in right in front of them. Just before Flight 108 entered the thunderstorm, Heilmann exclaimed, "Now hold on tight, here it comes!" Inside the thunderstorm, the first officer noticed that the aircraft was to the left of the approach centerline, and advised Borsdorf to correct their course. The crew then begun configuring their plane in preparation for landing.

07:55:06	First Officer Heilmann	So, glide alive.
07:55:10	Captain Borsdorf	Yeah. Quarter flaps.
07:55:14	First Officer Heilmann	Selected.
07:55:??	Captain Borsdorf	And half [flaps].

The director then instructed Flight 108 to switch over to the tower controller. Heilmann acknowledged this and switched over to the tower frequency. A few seconds later, the Metroliner was struck by lightning, causing the aircraft's entire electrical system to fail, including the Cockpit Voice Recorder (CVR) and the Flight Data Recorder (FDR).

At 07:56, witnesses on the ground reported seeing the aircraft descending from the cloud cover in a steep bank before leveling off and then climbing back into the thunderstorm. A minute later, the aircraft dived out again before climbing back up. Flight 108 then emerged for a third time. However, when they attempted to climb back up, they exceeded the Metroliner's structural limits and it broke apart midair. The right wing separated from the fuselage and pivoted left, causing the right engine's propellers to slice through the forward fuselage, splitting Flight 108 in half. The aircraft then entered an uncontrolled spiral and broke apart further before hitting the ground in several pieces.

== Investigation ==
The investigation revealed that the flight was struck by lightning during the approach to Düsseldorf, which disrupted the electrical system and therefore the flight instruments. The pilots became disorientated and blindly entered a high speed descent. Witnesses on the ground described the plane as coming out of the clouds briefly and entering a climb, which suggested that the crew briefly regained orientation of the aircraft upon seeing the ground. However, once it re-entered the clouds the crew likely became disoriented again. After almost 2 minutes of "predominantly uncontrolled flight," one of the trailing edge flaps (which could not be retracted without electrical power) failed due to overloading, sending the aircraft into an unrecoverable spiral during which it disintegrated in midair.

== In popular culture ==
The crash was featured in S26 E3 of the Canadian documentary series Mayday, also known as Air Crash Investigation, titled "A Perfect Storm."
