= Nürnberger Flugdienst =

German regional airline, 1974–1992

- The logo of Nürnberger Flugdienst

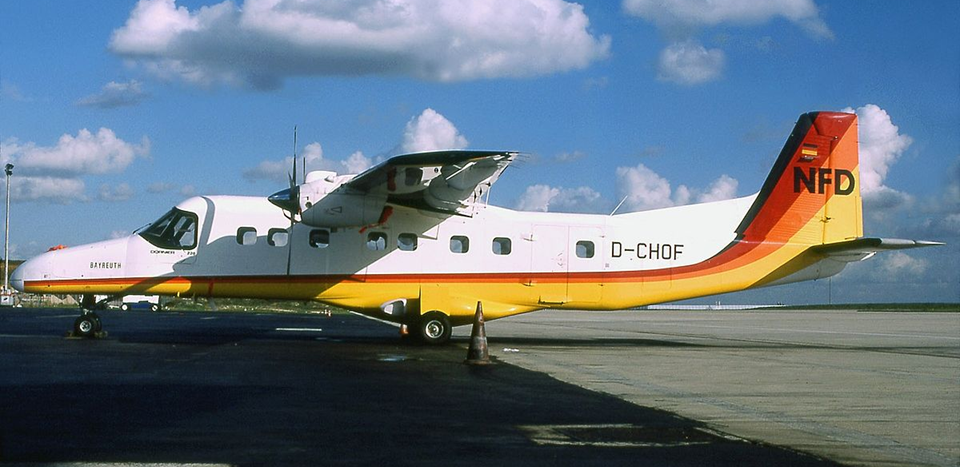
- A Dornier 228 of NFD
IATA	ICAO	Call sign
NS	NFD	FLAMINGO
- Founded: 1974
- Ceased operations: 1992 (Merged into Eurowings)
- Hubs: Nuremberg Airport
- Fleet size: 21
- Destinations: 32

Nürnberger Flugdienst (ger.: Nuremberg Air Service; abbr. NFD) was a German regional airline that operated between 1974 and 1992. Its fleet included planes ranging from the Beechcraft King Air up to the Boeing 757. It was for a long time the dominant airline at Nuremberg Airport.

== History ==
NFD was founded in 1974. NFD in 1975 began operations with a Piper seneca in 1974, with multiple Cessna 414s. Following two accidents at NFD the company restructured in the summer of 1979. During its initial years, it served 32 destinations and dominated Nuremberg Airport.

The logo was designed by the Academy of Fine Arts, Nuremberg. In 1993, it merged with Dortmunder Reise- und Industrieflug (ger.: Dortmund Travel and Industry Flights, later RFG) resulted in the creation of Eurowings. Eurowings used NFD's ICAO and IATA codes since the International Air Transport Association had not approved them yet.

== Fleet ==
- ATR 42
- ATR 72
- Dornier 228
- Metroliner III
- Boeing 757 (for Air Europe)
- Cessna 414

== Destinations included ==
=== Austria ===
- Vienna

=== France ===
- Lyon
- Paris
- Marseille

=== Germany ===
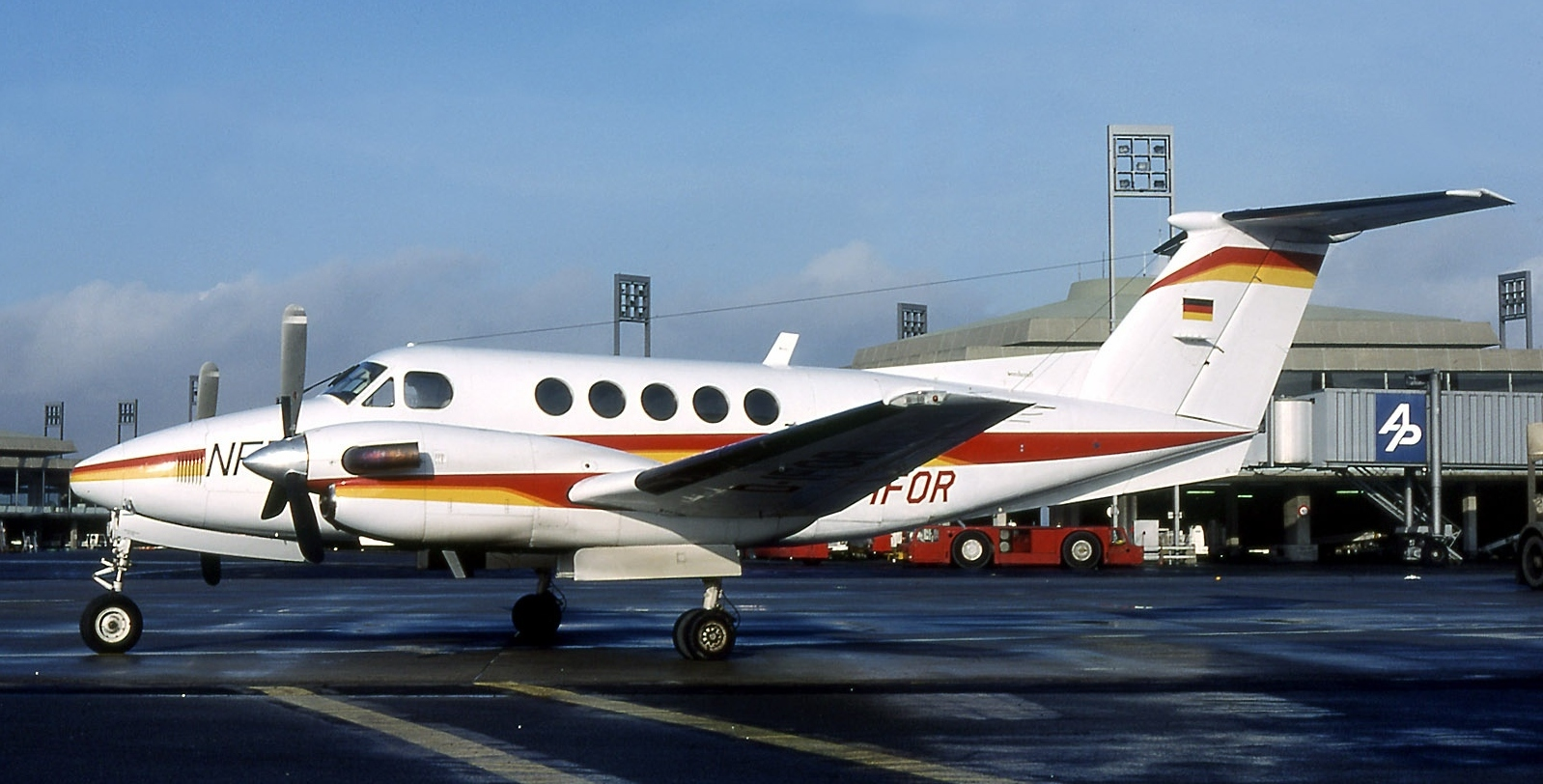
A Beech King Air of NFD

- Bremen
- Düsseldorf
- Hamburg
- Hanover
- Hof
- Munich
- Nuremberg (base)
- Saarbrücken

=== Italy ===
- Corfu
- Florence
- Naples
- Milan

=== Spain ===
- Palma De Mallorca

=== Switzerland ===
- Zurich

=== Yugoslavia (current Montenegro) ===
- Tivat

== Incidents ==
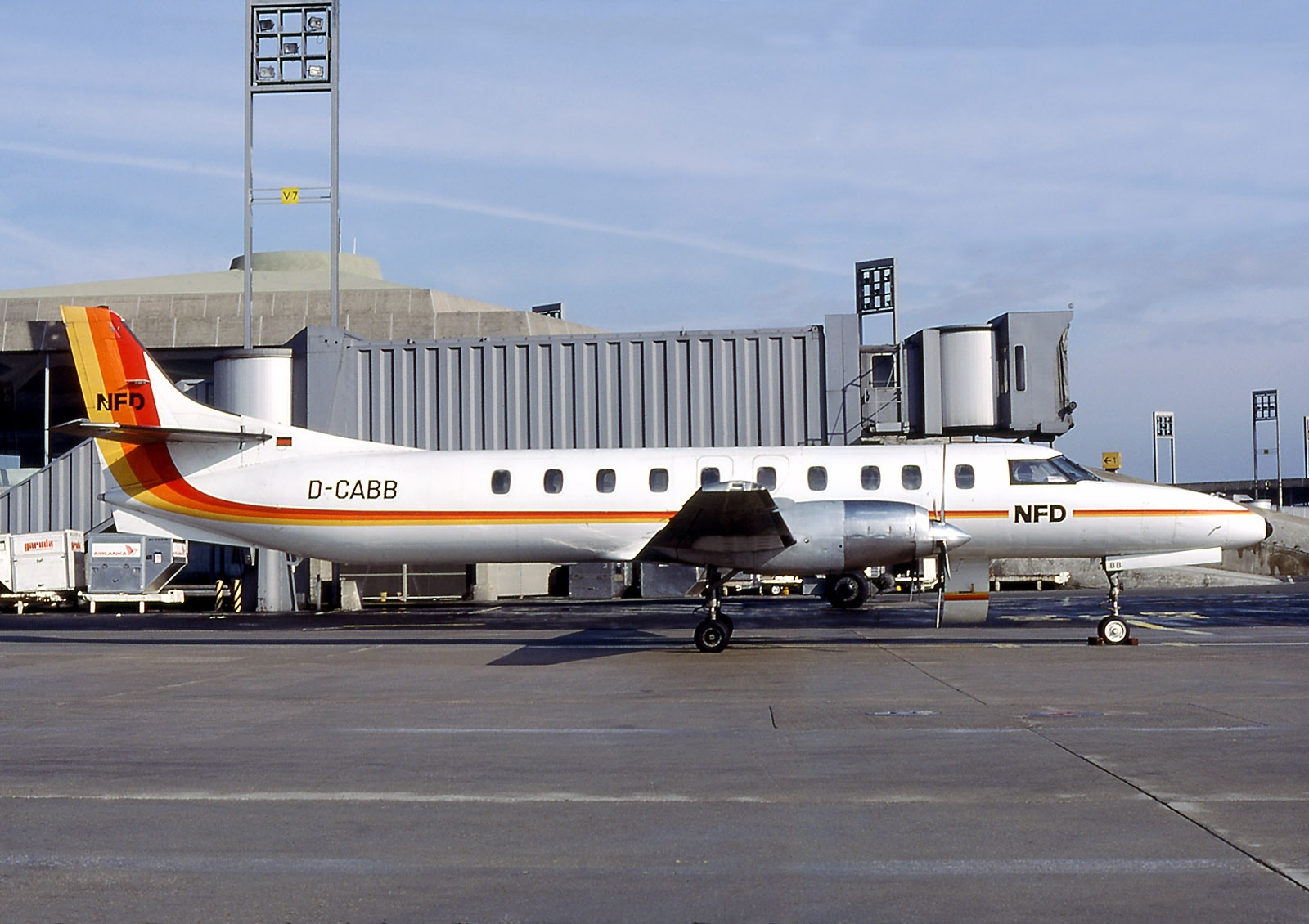
The NFD aircraft that crashed as flight 108

Nürnberger Flugdienst Flight 108 was hit by a bolt of lightning, leading to a spatial disorientation and mid-air disintegration killing all 21 people on board.

On April 14, 1977, a Cessna 414 was approaching Nuremberg when it struck power lines, killing all 6 occupants on board.

== See also ==
- List of defunct airlines of Germany
