= Finite wing =

A finite wing is an aerodynamic wing with tips that result in trailing vortices. This is in contrast to an infinite wing. According to John D. Anderson, Jr., finite wings experience 3-dimensional effects of airflow not experienced by infinite airfoils: downwash and induced drag.
