= Lift-induced drag =

Type of aerodynamic resistance against the motion of a wing or other airfoil

Lift-induced drag, induced drag, vortex drag, or sometimes drag due to lift, in aerodynamics, is an aerodynamic drag force that occurs whenever a moving object experiences aerodynamic lift. This drag force acts on the wings of aircraft, birds and insects whenever lift is being generated. It also acts on propellers and rotors whenever thrust is being generated. It acts on the horizontal stabilizer of an aircraft and an airfoil installed on a racing car. It is symbolized as $D_\text{i}$, and the lift-induced drag coefficient as $C_{D,i}$.

For a fixed-wing aircraft in straight flight, the lift-induced drag is directly proportional to the weight of the aircraft. However, it is inversely proportional to its airspeed so as the speed of the aircraft increases, the lift-induced drag decreases. As a consequence, the total drag on the aircraft does not reach a minimum at the stalling speed of the aircraft, but at a speed called the speed-for-minimum-drag which is faster than the stalling speed.

For a constant amount of lift, such as an aircraft in straight flight, lift-induced drag can be reduced by increasing airspeed. A counter-intuitive effect of this is that, up to the speed-for-minimum-drag, the aircraft needs less power to fly faster. Induced drag is also reduced if the wingspan is greater, or for wings with wingtip devices.

== Explanation ==
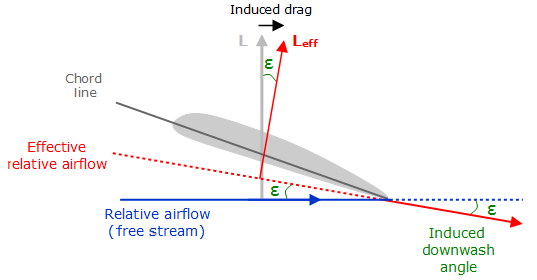
Induced drag is related to the angle of the induced downwash in the vicinity of the wing. The grey vertical line labeled "L" is the force required to counteract the weight of the aircraft. The red vector labeled "L_{eff}" is the actual lift on the wing; it is perpendicular to the effective relative airflow in the vicinity of the wing. The lift generated by the wing has been tilted rearwards through an angle equal to the downwash angle in three-dimensional flow. The component of "L_{eff}" parallel to the free stream is the induced drag on the wing.

The total aerodynamic force acting on a body is usually thought of as having two components, lift and drag. By definition, the component of force parallel to the oncoming flow is called drag, and the component perpendicular to the oncoming flow is called lift. At practical angles of attack the lift greatly exceeds the drag.

Lift is produced by the changing direction of the flow around a wing. The change of direction results in a change of velocity (even if there is no speed change), which is an acceleration. To change the direction of the flow therefore requires that a force be applied to the fluid; the total aerodynamic force is simply the reaction force of the fluid acting on the wing.

An aircraft in slow flight at a high angle of attack will generate an aerodynamic reaction force with a high drag component. By increasing the speed and reducing the angle of attack, the lift generated can be held constant while the drag component is reduced. At the optimum angle of attack, total drag is minimised. If speed is increased beyond this, total drag will increase again due to increased profile drag.

== Vortices ==
When producing lift, air below the wing is at a higher pressure than the air pressure above the wing. On a wing of finite span, this pressure difference causes air to flow from the lower surface, around the wingtip, towards the upper surface. This spanwise flow of air combines with chordwise flowing air, which twists the airflow and produces vortices along the wing trailing edge.

The continuous sheet of small vortices across the trailing edge is unstable, and they quickly combine to produce wingtip vortices which trail behind the wingtip.

The vortices reduce the wing's ability to generate lift, so that it requires a higher angle of attack for the same lift, which tilts the total aerodynamic force rearwards and increases the drag component of that force. The angular deflection is small and has little effect on the lift. However, there is an increase in the drag equal to the product of the lift force and the angle through which it is deflected. Since the deflection is itself a function of the lift, the additional drag is proportional to the square of the lift.

== Calculation of induced drag ==
For a planar wing with an elliptical lift distribution, induced drag D_{i} can be calculated as follows:

$$D_\text{i} = \frac{L^2}{\frac{1}{2}\rho_0 V_E^2 \pi b^2}$$,

where

$L \,$ is the lift,
$\rho_0 \,$ is the standard density of air at sea level,
$V_E \,$ is the equivalent airspeed,
$\pi \,$ is the ratio of circumference to diameter of a circle, and
$b \,$ is the wingspan.

From this equation it is clear that the induced drag varies with the square of the lift; and inversely with the square of the equivalent airspeed; and inversely with the square of the wingspan. Deviation from the non-planar wing with elliptical lift distribution are taken into account by dividing the induced drag by the span efficiency factor $e$.

To compare with other sources of drag, it can be convenient to express this equation in terms of lift and drag coefficients:

$C_{D,i} = \frac{D_\text{i}}{\frac{1}{2}\rho_0 V_E^2 S} = \frac{C_L^2}{\pi A\!\!\text{R} e}$, where
$$C_L = \frac{L}{ \frac{1}{2} \rho_0 V_E^2 S}$$

and

$A\!\!\text{R}=\frac{b^2}{S} \,$ is the aspect ratio,
$S \,$ is a reference wing area,
$e \,$ is the span efficiency factor.

This indicates how, for a given wing area, high aspect ratio wings are beneficial to flight efficiency. With $C_L$ being a function of angle of attack, induced drag increases as the angle of attack increases.

The above equation can be derived using Prandtl's lifting-line theory. Similar methods can also be used to compute the minimum induced drag for non-planar wings or for arbitrary lift distributions.

== Reducing induced drag ==
According to the equations above, for wings generating the same lift, the induced drag is inversely proportional to the square of the wingspan. A wing of infinite span and uniform airfoil section (or a 2D wing) would experience no induced drag. The drag characteristics of a wing with infinite span can be simulated using an airfoil section the width of a wind tunnel.

An increase in wingspan or a solution with a similar effect is one way to reduce induced drag. The Wright brothers used curved trailing edges on their rectangular wings. Some early aircraft had fins mounted on the tips. More recent aircraft have wingtip-mounted winglets to reduce the induced drag. Winglets also provide some benefit by increasing the vertical height of the wing system. Wingtip mounted fuel tanks and wing washout may also provide some benefit.

Typically, the elliptical spanwise distribution of lift produces the minimum induced drag for a planar wing of a given span. A small number of aircraft have a planform approaching the elliptical — the most famous examples being the World War II Spitfire and Thunderbolt. For modern wings with winglets, the ideal lift distribution is not elliptical.

For a given wing area, a high aspect ratio wing will produce less induced drag than a wing of low aspect ratio. While induced drag is inversely proportional to the square of the wingspan, not necessarily inversely proportional to aspect ratio, if the wing area is held constant, then induced drag will be inversely proportional to aspect ratio. However, since wingspan can be increased while decreasing aspect ratio, or vice versa, the apparent relationship between aspect ratio and induced drag does not always hold.

For a typical twin-engine wide-body aircraft at cruise speed, induced drag is the second-largest component of total drag, accounting for approximately 37% of total drag. Skin friction drag is the largest component of total drag, at almost 48%. Reducing induced drag can therefore significantly reduce cost and environmental impact.

== Combined effect with other drag sources ==
Total drag is parasitic drag plus induced drag

In 1891, Samuel Langley published the results of his experiments on various flat plates. At the same airspeed and the same angle of attack, plates with higher aspect ratio produced greater lift and experienced lower drag than those with lower aspect ratio.

His experiments were carried out at relatively low airspeeds, slower than the speed for minimum drag. He observed that, at these low airspeeds, increasing speed required reducing power. (At higher airspeeds, parasitic drag came to dominate, causing the power required to increase with increasing airspeed.)

Induced drag must be added to the parasitic drag to find the total drag. Since induced drag is inversely proportional to the square of the airspeed (at a given lift) whereas parasitic drag is proportional to the square of the airspeed, the combined overall drag curve shows a minimum at some airspeed - the minimum drag speed (V_{MD}). An aircraft flying at this speed is operating at its optimal aerodynamic efficiency. According to the above equations, the speed for minimum drag occurs at the speed where the induced drag is equal to the parasitic drag. This is the speed at which for unpowered aircraft, optimum glide angle is achieved. This is also the speed for greatest range (although V_{MD} will decrease as the plane consumes fuel and becomes lighter). The speed for greatest range (i.e. distance travelled) is the speed at which a straight line from the origin is tangent to the fuel flow rate curve.

The curve of range versus airspeed is normally very shallow and it is customary to operate at the speed for 99% best range since this gives 3-5% greater speed for only 1% less range. Flying higher where the air is thinner will raise the speed at which minimum drag occurs, and so permits a faster voyage for the same amount of fuel. If the plane is flying at the maximum permissible speed, then there is an altitude at which the air density will be sufficient to keep it aloft while flying at the angle of attack that minimizes the drag. The optimum altitude will increase during the flight as the plane becomes lighter.

The speed for maximum endurance (i.e. time in the air) is the speed for minimum fuel flow rate, and is always less than the speed for greatest range. The fuel flow rate is calculated as the product of the power required and the engine specific fuel consumption (fuel flow rate per unit of power (Note: The engine specific fuel consumption is normally expressed in units of fuel flow rate per unit of thrust or per unit of power depending on whether the engine output is measured in thrust, as for a jet engine, or shaft horsepower, as for a propeller engine. To convert fuel rate per unit thrust to fuel rate per unit power one must divide by the speed.)). The power required is equal to the drag times the speed.

== See also ==
- Aerodynamic force
- Drag
- Oswald efficiency number
- Parasitic drag
- Wave drag
- Wingtip vortices

== Bibliography ==
- L. J. Clancy (1975), Aerodynamics, Pitman Publishing Limited, London. ISBN 0-273-01120-0
- Abbott, Ira H., and Von Doenhoff, Albert E. (1959), Theory of Wing Sections, Dover Publications, Standard Book Number 486-60586-8
- Luciano Demasi, Antonio Dipace, Giovanni Monegato, and Rauno Cavallaro. Invariant Formulation for the Minimum Induced Drag Conditions of Nonplanar Wing Systems, AIAA Journal, Vol. 52, No. 10 (2014), pp. 2223–2240. doi: 10.2514/1.J052837
