= Cruise (aeronautics) =

Main phase of level aircraft flight

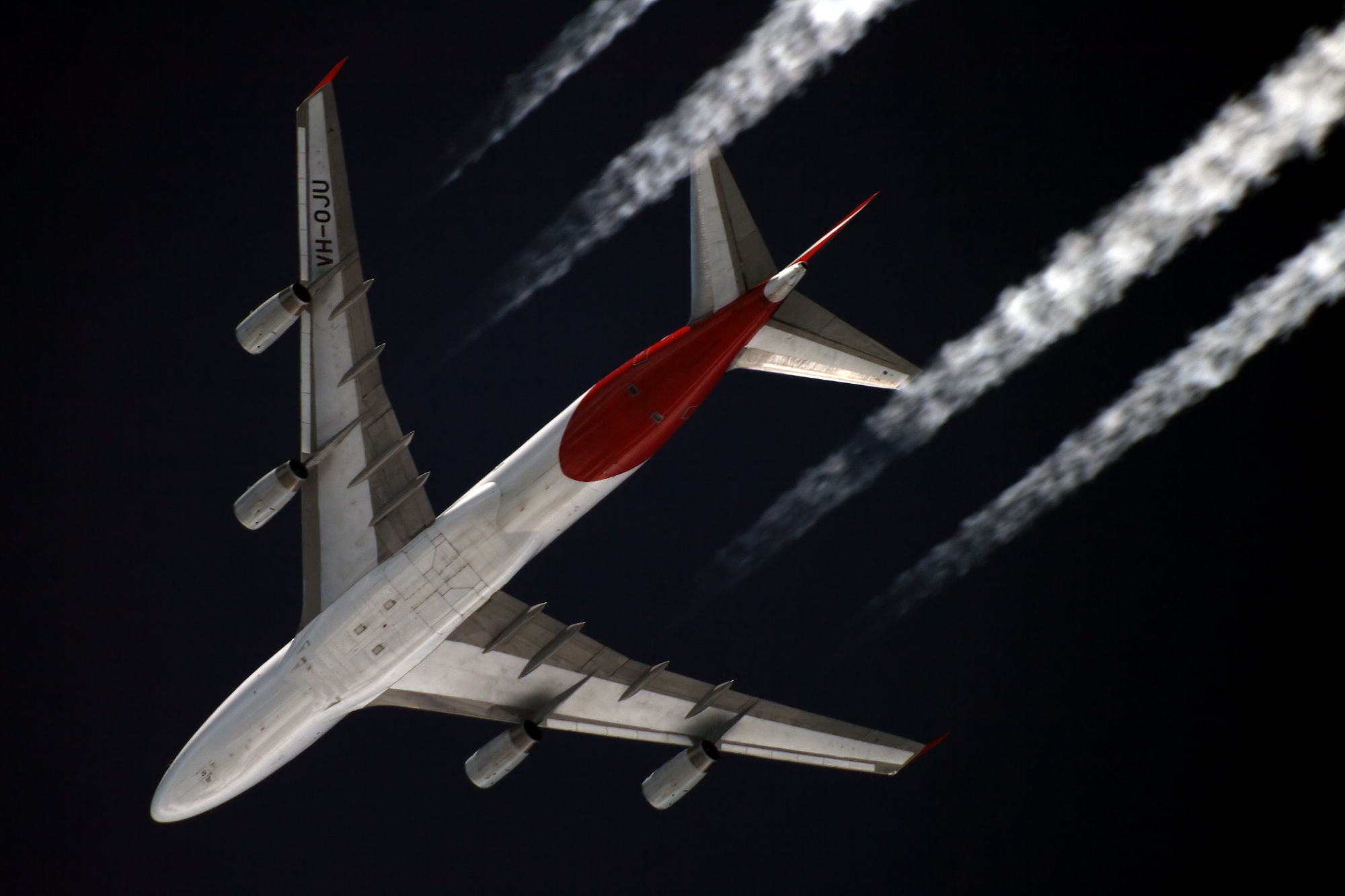
A Qantas four-engined Boeing 747-400 at cruise altitude

Cruise is the phase of aircraft flight from when the aircraft levels off after a climb until it begins to descend for landing. Cruising usually comprises the majority of a flight, and may include small changes in heading (direction of flight), airspeed, and altitude.

== Airliner cruise ==
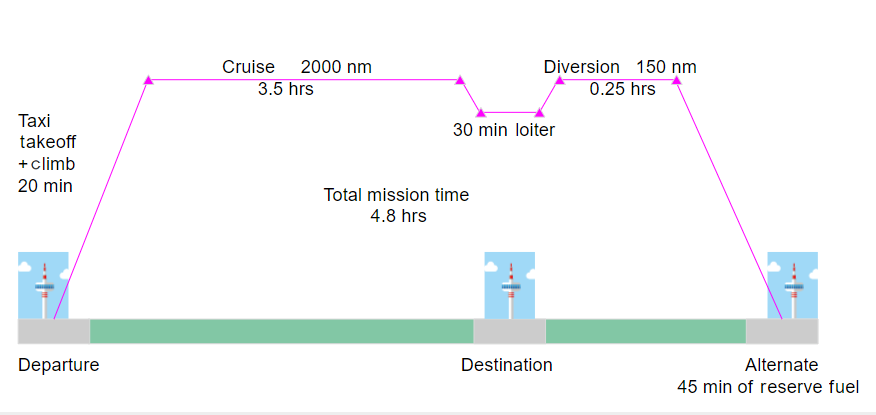
The cruise makes the longest part of a mission profile.

Commercial or passenger aircraft are usually designed for optimum performance around their cruise speed (V_{C}) and cruise altitude. Factors affecting optimum cruise speed and altitude include payload, center of gravity, air temperature, and humidity. Cruise altitude is usually where the higher ground speed is balanced against the decrease in engine thrust and efficiency at higher altitudes. Common narrowbodies like the Airbus A320 and Boeing 737NG cruise at Mach 0.78 (450 kn; 830 km/h), while modern widebodies like the Airbus A350 and Boeing 787 cruise at Mach 0.85 (490 kn; 900 km/h). The typical cruising altitude for commercial airliners is 31,000 to 38,000 feet (9,400 to 11,600 m; 5.9 to 7.2 mi). The speed which covers the greatest distance for a given amount of fuel is known as the maximum range speed. This is the speed at which drag is minimised.

For jet aircraft, "long-range cruise" speed (LRC) is defined as the speed which gives 99% of the maximum range, for a given weight. This results in a 3–5% increase in speed. It is also a more stable speed than maximum range speed, so gives less autothrottle movement. However, LRC speed does not take account of winds, or time-related costs other than fuel, so it has little practical value. Instead, the speed for most economical operation (ECON) is adjusted for wind and the cost index (CI), which is the ratio of time cost to fuel cost. A higher cost index results in a higher ECON speed. Cost index can be given in "Boeing" or "English" units as ($/hr)/(cents/lb), equivalent to 100 lb/hr. A typical cost index in these units might be anywhere from 5 to 150. Alternatively cost index can be given in metric or "Airbus" units of kg/min. Cost Index can range from zero to infinity. For a very low cost index, the aircraft will be limited by the minimum stall speed for its weight. For a very high cost index, the aircraft top speed will be limited by other factors such as engine thrust and Mach buffet.

In the presence of a tailwind, ECON airspeed can be reduced to take advantage of the tailwind, whereas in a headwind, ECON speed will be increased to avoid the penalty of the headwind. In the presence of a tailwind, LRC speed may give a higher fuel burn than ECON. As the aircraft consumes fuel, its weight decreases and the ECON speed decreases. This is because a heavier aircraft should fly faster to generate the required lift at the most efficient lift coefficient. ECON speed will also be higher at higher altitudes because the density of the air is lower.

== Propeller aircraft ==
For propeller aircraft, drag is minimised when the lift-to-drag ratio is maximised. However, the speed for this is typically regarded as too slow, so propeller aircraft typically cruise at a significantly faster speed. Combustion engines have an optimum efficiency level for fuel consumption and power output. Generally, gasoline piston engines are most efficient between idle speed and 30% short of full throttle. Diesels are most efficient at around 90% of full throttle.

== Altitude ==
As the aircraft consumes fuel, its weight decreases and the optimum altitude for fuel economy increases. For traffic control reasons it is usually necessary for an aircraft to stay at a cleared flight level. On long-haul flights, the pilot may ask air traffic control to climb from one flight level to a higher one, in a manoeuvre known as a step climb.

== See also ==
- Fuel economy in aircraft
- Range (aeronautics)
- Lift-to-drag ratio
- Loiter (aeronautics)
- Supercruise
- Takeoff
- Landing
- Visual flight rules
