= Parasitic drag =

Aerodynamic resistance against the motion of an object

Drag curve for a lifting body in steady flight

Parasitic drag, also known as profile drag, is a type of aerodynamic drag that acts on any object when the object is moving through a fluid. Parasitic drag is defined as the combination of form drag and skin friction drag.

It is named parasitic because it is not useful, in contrast with lift-induced drag which is created when an airfoil generates lift. All objects experience parasitic drag, regardless of whether they generate lift. Parasitic drag comprises all types of drag except lift-induced drag, and the total drag on an aircraft or other object which generates lift is the sum of parasitic drag and lift-induced drag.

== Form drag ==
Form drag arises because of the shape of the object. The general size and shape of the body are the most important factors in form drag; bodies with a larger presented cross-section will have a higher drag than thinner bodies; sleek ("streamlined") objects have lower form drag. Form drag follows the drag equation, meaning that it increases with the square of the velocity, and thus becomes more important for high-speed aircraft.

Form drag depends on the shape of the longitudinal section of the body (along its long axis). A prudent choice of body profile is essential for a low drag coefficient. Streamlines should be continuous, and separation of the boundary layer with its attendant vortices should be avoided.

Form drag includes interference drag, caused by the mixing of airflow streams. For example, where the wing and fuselage meet at the wing root, two airstreams merge into one. This mixing can cause eddy currents, turbulence, or restrict smooth airflow. Interference drag is greater when two surfaces meet at perpendicular angles, and can be minimised by the use of fairings.

Wave drag, also known as supersonic wave drag or compressibility drag, is a component of form drag caused by shock waves generated when an aircraft is moving at transonic and supersonic speeds.

Form drag is a type of pressure drag, a term which also includes lift-induced drag. Form drag is pressure drag due to separation.

== Skin friction drag ==
Skin friction drag arises from the friction of the fluid against the "skin" of the object that is moving through it. Skin friction arises from the interaction between the fluid and the skin of the body, and is directly related to the wetted surface, the area of the surface of the body that is in contact with the fluid. Air in contact with a body will stick to the body's surface and that layer will tend to stick to the next layer of air and that in turn to further layers, hence the body is dragging some amount of air with it. The force required to drag an "attached" layer of air with the body is called skin friction drag. Skin friction drag imparts some momentum to a mass of air as it passes through it and that air applies a retarding force on the body. As with other components of parasitic drag, skin friction follows the drag equation and rises with the square of the velocity.

Skin friction is caused by viscous drag in the boundary layer around the object. The boundary layer at the front of the object is usually laminar and relatively thin, but becomes turbulent and thicker towards the rear. The position of the transition point from laminar to turbulent flow depends on the shape of the object. There are two ways to decrease friction drag: the first is to shape the moving body so that laminar flow is possible. The second method is to increase the length and decrease the cross-section of the moving object as much as is practical. To do so, a designer can consider the fineness ratio, which is the length of the aircraft divided by its diameter at the widest point (L/D). It is mostly kept 6:1 for subsonic flows. Increase in length increases Reynolds number ($Re$). With $Re$ in the denominator for skin friction coefficient's relation, as its value is increased (in laminar range), total friction drag is reduced. While decrease in cross-sectional area decreases drag force on the body as the disturbance in air flow is less.

The skin friction coefficient, $C_f$, is defined by

$$C_f \equiv \frac{\tau_w}{q},$$

where $\tau_w$ is the local wall shear stress, and q is the free-stream dynamic pressure. For boundary layers without a pressure gradient in the x direction, it is related to the momentum thickness as

$$C_f = 2 \frac{d \theta}{d x}.$$

For comparison, the turbulent empirical relation known as the One-seventh Power Law (derived by Theodore von Kármán) is:

$$C_{f,tur} = \frac{0.074}{Re^{0.2} },$$

where $Re$ is the Reynolds number.

For a laminar flow over a plate, the skin friction coefficient can be determined using the formula:

$$C_{f,lam} = \frac{1.328}{\sqrt{Re}}$$

== See also ==
- NACA duct
- Jet engine ram drag
- Skin friction line
