= Lift coefficient =

Dimensionless quantity relating lift to fluid density and velocity over an area

In fluid dynamics, the lift coefficient (C_{L}) is a dimensionless quantity that relates the lift generated by a lifting body to the fluid density around the body, the fluid velocity and an associated reference area. A lifting body is a foil or a complete foil-bearing body such as a fixed-wing aircraft. C_{L} is a function of the angle of the body to the flow, its Reynolds number and its Mach number. The section lift coefficient c_{l} refers to the dynamic lift characteristics of a two-dimensional foil section, with the reference area replaced by the foil chord.

== Definitions ==
The lift coefficient C_{L} is defined by

$$C_\mathrm L \equiv \frac{L}{q \, S} = {\frac{L}{\frac{1}{2}\rho u^2 \, S}} = {\frac{2 L}{\rho u^2S}}$$,

where $L\,$ is the lift force, $S\,$ is the relevant surface area and $q\,$ is the fluid dynamic pressure, in turn linked to the fluid density $\rho\,$, and to the flow speed $u\,$. The choice of the reference surface should be specified since it is arbitrary. For example, for cylindric profiles (the 3D extrusion of an airfoil in the spanwise direction), the first axis generating the surface is always in the spanwise direction. In aerodynamics and thin airfoil theory, the second axis is commonly in the chordwise direction:

$$S_{aer} \equiv c \, s$$

resulting in a coefficient:

$$C_{\mathrm L, \, aer} \equiv \frac{L}{q \, c \, s},$$

While in marine dynamics and for thick airfoils, the second axis is sometimes taken in the thickness direction:

$$S_{mar} = t \, s$$

resulting in a different coefficient:

$$C_{\mathrm L, \, mar} \equiv \frac{L}{q \, t \, s}$$

The ratio between these two coefficients is the thickness ratio:

$$C_{\mathrm L, \, mar} \equiv \frac c t C_{\mathrm L, \, aer}$$

The lift coefficient can be approximated using the lifting-line theory, numerically calculated or measured in a wind tunnel test of a complete aircraft configuration.

== Section lift coefficient ==
A typical curve showing section lift coefficient versus angle of attack for a cambered airfoil

Lift coefficient may also be used as a characteristic of a particular shape (or cross-section) of an airfoil. In this application it is called the section lift coefficient $c_\text{l}$. It is common to show, for a particular airfoil section, the relationship between section lift coefficient and angle of attack. It is also useful to show the relationship between section lift coefficient and drag coefficient.

The section lift coefficient is based on two-dimensional flow over a wing of infinite span and non-varying cross-section so the lift is independent of spanwise effects and is defined in terms of $L^ \prime$, the lift force per unit span of the wing. The definition becomes

$$c_\text{l} = \frac{L^ \prime}{q \, c},$$

where $c\,$ is the reference length that should always be specified: in aerodynamics and airfoil theory usually the airfoil chord is chosen, while in marine dynamics and for struts usually the thickness $t\,$ is chosen. Note this is directly analogous to the drag coefficient since the chord can be interpreted as the "area per unit span".

For a given angle of attack, c_{l} can be calculated approximately using the thin airfoil theory, calculated numerically or determined from wind tunnel tests on a finite-length test piece, with end-plates designed to ameliorate the three-dimensional effects. Plots of c_{l} versus angle of attack show the same general shape for all airfoils, but the particular numbers will vary. They show an almost linear increase in lift coefficient with increasing angle of attack with a gradient known as the lift slope. For a thin airfoil of any shape the lift slope is 2π per radian, or π^{2}/90 ≃ 0.11 per degree. At higher angles a maximum point is reached, after which the lift coefficient reduces. The angle at which maximum lift coefficient occurs is the stall angle of the airfoil, which is approximately 10 to 15 degrees on a typical airfoil.

The stall angle for a given profile is also increasing with increasing values of the Reynolds number, at higher speeds indeed the flow tends to stay attached to the profile for longer delaying the stall condition. For this reason sometimes wind tunnel testing performed at lower Reynolds numbers than the simulated real life condition can sometimes give conservative feedback overestimating the profiles stall.

Symmetric airfoils necessarily have plots of c_{l} versus angle of attack symmetric about the c_{l} axis, but for any airfoil with positive camber, i.e. asymmetrical, convex from above, there is still a small but positive lift coefficient with angles of attack less than zero. That is, the angle at which c_{l} = 0 is negative. On such airfoils at zero angle of attack the pressures on the upper surface are lower than on the lower surface.

== Thin airfoil theory ==
NACA 0012, a non-cambered airfoil that would be governed by the first equation

NACA 4412, a cambered airfoil that would be governed by the second equation

The thin airfoil theory is a method of calculating lift coefficient for an idealized zero-thickness, infinite wingspan symmetric (non-cambered) airfoil in an inviscid fluid. It was devised by German mathematician Max Munk and later improved upon by Hermann Glauert and others.

There are several problems with the theory; it makes several assumptions that do not take into account real-world aerodynamics. Its assumption that the airfoil is in an inviscid fluid does not take into account stalls, which usually occur around 10-15º for standard airfoils. Also, by assuming the wings extend infinitely, it assumes the absence of wingtips, which create induced drag. However, it is still a good approximation up until stall angle for planes that do not have a low aspect ratio (which causes more induced drag).

The thin airfoil theory uses the following equation for the lift coefficient of a non-cambered airfoil:

$c_l=2\pi\alpha$
Where $c_l$ is the lift coefficient and $\alpha$ is the angle of attack (assuming the angle of attack is small enough that a stall does not occur).

It can also be used to calculate the lift coefficient of a cambered airfoil:

$c_l=c_{l0}+2\pi\alpha$
Where $c_{l0}$ is the lift coefficient at zero angle of attack (which only a cambered airfoil can produce).

== See also ==
- Lift-to-drag ratio
- Drag coefficient
- Foil (fluid mechanics)
- Pitching moment
- Circulation control wing
- Zero lift axis
