= Kutta–Joukowski theorem =

Formula relating lift on an airfoil to fluid speed, density, and circulation

The Kutta–Joukowski theorem is a fundamental theorem in aerodynamics that relates the lift per unit span of an airfoil (and any two-dimensional body, including circular cylinders) translating in a uniform fluid at constant speed to the circulation of the velocity field, under conditions where the flow in the body-fixed frame is steady and unseparated. The theorem relates the lift generated by an airfoil to the speed of the airfoil through the fluid, the density of the fluid and the circulation around the airfoil. The circulation is defined as the line integral around a closed loop enclosing the airfoil of the component of the velocity of the fluid tangent to the loop. It is named after Martin Kutta and Nikolai Zhukovsky (or Joukowski) who first developed its key ideas in the early 20th century. Kutta–Joukowski theorem is an inviscid theory, but it is a good approximation for real viscous flow in typical aerodynamic applications.

Kutta–Joukowski theorem relates lift to circulation much like the Magnus effect relates side force (called Magnus force) to rotation. However, the circulation here is not induced by rotation of the airfoil. The fluid flow in the presence of the airfoil can be considered to be the superposition of a translational flow and a rotating flow. This rotating flow is induced by the effects of camber, angle of attack and the sharp trailing edge of the airfoil. It should not be confused with a vortex like a tornado encircling the airfoil. At a large distance from the airfoil, the rotating flow may be regarded as induced by a line vortex (with the rotating line perpendicular to the two-dimensional plane). In the derivation of the Kutta–Joukowski theorem the airfoil is usually mapped onto a circular cylinder. In many textbooks, the theorem is proved for a circular cylinder and the Joukowski airfoil, but it holds true for general airfoils.

== Lift force formula ==
The asymmetric shape of the streamlines shows the presence of circulation which causes the cylinder to experience a lift force whose magnitude is predicted by the Kutta-Joukowski theorem

The theorem applies to two-dimensional inviscid flow around an airfoil section (or any shape of infinite span). The lift per unit span $L'\,$ of the airfoil is given by

$L^\prime = \rho_\infty V_\infty\Gamma,$	1

where $\rho_\infty$ and $V_\infty$ are the fluid density and the fluid velocity far upstream of the airfoil, and $\Gamma$ is the circulation defined as the line integral

$$\Gamma = \oint_{C} V \cdot d\mathbf{s} = \oint_{C} V\cos\theta\, ds$$

around a closed contour $C$ enclosing the airfoil and followed in the negative (clockwise) direction. As explained below, this path must be in a region of potential flow and not in the boundary layer of the cylinder. The integrand $V\cos\theta$ is the component of the local fluid velocity in the direction tangent to the curve $C$, and $ds$ is an infinitesimal length on the curve $C$. Equation (1) is a form of the Kutta–Joukowski theorem.

Kuethe and Schetzer state the Kutta–Joukowski theorem as follows:

The force per unit length acting on a right cylinder of any cross section whatsoever is equal to $\rho_\infty V_\infty \Gamma$ and is perpendicular to the direction of $V_\infty.$

== Circulation and the Kutta condition ==
A lift-producing airfoil either has camber or operates at a positive angle of attack, the angle between the chord line and the fluid flow far upstream of the airfoil. Moreover, the airfoil must have a sharp trailing edge.

Any real fluid is viscous, which implies that the fluid velocity vanishes on the airfoil. Prandtl showed that for large Reynolds number, defined as $\mathord{\text{Re}} = \frac{\rho V_{\infty}c_A}{\mu}\,$, and small angle of attack, the flow around a thin airfoil is composed of a narrow viscous region called the boundary layer near the body and an inviscid flow region outside. In applying the Kutta-Joukowski theorem, the loop must be chosen outside this boundary layer. (For example, the circulation calculated using the loop corresponding to the surface of the airfoil would be zero for a viscous fluid.)

The sharp trailing edge requirement corresponds physically to a flow in which the fluid moving along the lower and upper surfaces of the airfoil meet smoothly, with no fluid moving around the trailing edge of the airfoil. This is known as the Kutta condition.

Kutta and Joukowski showed that for computing the pressure and lift of a thin airfoil for flow at large Reynolds number and small angle of attack, the flow can be assumed inviscid in the entire region outside the airfoil provided the Kutta condition is imposed. This is known as the potential flow theory and works remarkably well in practice.

== Derivation ==
Two derivations are presented below. The first is a heuristic argument, based on physical insight. The second is a formal and technical one, requiring basic vector analysis and complex analysis. The theorem can also be derived without complex analysis by applying conservation of momentum to a control volume enclosing the airfoil, which was the method originally used by Joukowski. The lift is then balanced by a combination of pressure force and flux of vertical momentum across the control surface. How the lift divides between the two depends on the shape of the surface (for a large circle it is half each), but the total is always ρ_{∞}V_{∞}Γ.

=== Heuristic argument ===
For a heuristic argument, consider a thin airfoil of chord $c$ and infinite span, moving through air of density $\rho$. Let the airfoil be inclined to the oncoming flow to produce an air speed $V$ on one side of the airfoil, and an air speed $V + v$ on the other side. The circulation is then

$$\Gamma = Vc - (V + v)c = -v c.\,$$

The difference in pressure $\Delta P$ between the two sides of the airfoil can be found by applying Bernoulli's equation:

$$\begin{align}
\frac {\rho}{2}(V)^2 + (P + \Delta P) &= \frac {\rho}{2}(V + v)^2 + P,\, \\
\frac {\rho}{2}(V)^2 + \Delta P &= \frac {\rho}{2}(V^2 + 2 V v + v^2),\, \\
\Delta P &= \rho V v \qquad \text{(ignoring } \frac{\rho}{2}v^2),\,
\end{align}$$

so the downward force on the air, per unit span, is

$$L' = c \Delta P = \rho V v c = -\rho V\Gamma\,$$

and the upward force (lift) on the airfoil is $\rho V\Gamma.\,$

A differential version of this theorem applies on each element of the plate and is the basis of thin-airfoil theory.

=== Formal derivation ===
Formal derivation of Kutta–Joukowski theorem

First of all, the force exerted on each unit length of a cylinder of arbitrary cross section is calculated. Let this force per unit length (from now on referred to simply as force) be $\mathbf{F}$. So then the total force is:

$$\mathbf{F} = -\oint_C p \mathbf{n}\, ds,$$

where C denotes the borderline of the cylinder, $p$ is the static pressure of the fluid, $\mathbf{n}\,$ is the unit vector normal to the cylinder, and ds is the arc element of the borderline of the cross section. Now let $\phi$ be the angle between the normal vector and the vertical. Then the components of the above force are:

$$F_x = -\oint_C p \sin\phi\, ds\,, \qquad F_y = \oint_C p \cos\phi\, ds.$$

Now comes a crucial step: consider the used two-dimensional space as a complex plane. So every vector can be represented as a complex number, with its first component equal to the real part and its second component equal to the imaginary part of the complex number. Then, the force can be represented as:

$$F = F_x + iF_y = -\oint_Cp(\sin\phi - i\cos\phi)\,ds .$$

The next step is to take the complex conjugate of the force $F$ and do some manipulation:

$$\bar{F} = -\oint_C p(\sin\phi + i\cos\phi)\,ds = -i\oint_C p(\cos\phi - i\sin\phi)\, ds = -i\oint_C p e^{-i\phi}\,ds.$$

Surface segments ds are related to changes dz along them by:

$$\begin{align}
dz &= dx + idy = ds(\cos\phi + i\sin\phi) = ds\,e^{i\phi} \\
{} \Rightarrow d\bar{z} &= e^{-i\phi}ds.
\end{align}$$

Plugging this back into the integral, the result is:

$$\bar{F} = -i\oint_C p \, d\bar{z}.$$

Now the Bernoulli equation is used, in order to remove the pressure from the integral. Throughout the analysis it is assumed that there is no outer force field present. The mass density of the flow is $\rho.$ Then pressure $p$ is related to velocity $v = v_x + iv_y$ by:

$$p = p_0 - \frac{\rho |v|^2}{2}.$$

With this the force $F$ becomes:

$$\bar{F} = -ip_0\oint_C d\bar{z} + i \frac{\rho}{2} \oint_C |v|^2\, d\bar{z} = \frac{i\rho}{2}\oint_C |v|^2\,d\bar{z}.$$

Only one step is left to do: introduce $w = f(z),$ the complex potential of the flow. This is related to the velocity components as $w' = v_x - iv_y = \bar{v},$ where the apostrophe denotes differentiation with respect to the complex variable z. The velocity is tangent to the borderline C, so this means that $v = \pm |v| e^{i\phi}.$ Therefore, $v^2 d\bar{z} = |v|^2 dz,$ and the desired expression for the force is obtained:

$$\bar{F}=\frac{i\rho}{2}\oint_C w'^2\,dz,$$

which is called the Blasius theorem.

To arrive at the Joukowski formula, this integral has to be evaluated. From complex analysis it is known that a holomorphic function can be presented as a Laurent series. From the physics of the problem it is deduced that the derivative of the complex potential $w$ will look thus:

$$w'(z) = a_0 + \frac{a_1}{z} + \frac{a_2}{z^2} + \cdots .$$

The function does not contain higher order terms, since the velocity stays finite at infinity. So $a_0\,$ represents the derivative the complex potential at infinity: $a_0 = v_{x\infty} - iv_{y\infty}\,$. The next task is to find out the meaning of $a_1\,$. Using the residue theorem on the above series:

$$a_1 = \frac{1}{2\pi i} \oint_C w'\, dz.$$

Now perform the above integration:

$$\begin{align}
\oint_C w'(z)\,dz &= \oint_C (v_x - iv_y)(dx + idy) \\
&= \oint_C (v_x\,dx + v_y\,dy) + i\oint_C(v_x\,dy - v_y\,dx) \\
&= \oint_C \mathbf{v}\,{ds} + i\oint_C(v_x\,dy - v_y\,dx).
\end{align}$$

The first integral is recognized as the circulation denoted by $\Gamma.$ The second integral can be evaluated after some manipulation:

$$\oint_C(v_x\,dy - v_y\,dx) = \oint_C\left(\frac{\partial\psi}{\partial y}dy + \frac{\partial\psi}{\partial x}dx\right) = \oint_C d\psi = 0.$$

Here $\psi\,$ is the stream function. Since the C border of the cylinder is a streamline itself, the stream function does not change on it, and $d\psi = 0 \,$. Hence the above integral is zero. As a result:

$$a_1 = \frac{\Gamma}{2\pi i}.$$

Take the square of the series:

$$w'^2(z) = a_0^2 + \frac{a_0\Gamma}{\pi i z} + \cdots.$$

Plugging this back into the Blasius–Chaplygin formula, and performing the integration using the residue theorem:

$$\bar{F} = \frac{i\rho}{2}\left[2\pi i \frac{a_0\Gamma}{\pi i}\right] = i\rho a_0 \Gamma = i\rho \Gamma(v_{x\infty} - iv_{y\infty}) = \rho\Gamma v_{y\infty} + i\rho\Gamma v_{x\infty} = F_x - iF_y.$$

And so the Kutta–Joukowski formula is:

$$\begin{align}
F_x &= \rho \Gamma v_{y\infty}\,, &
F_y &= -\rho \Gamma v_{x\infty}.
\end{align}$$

== Lift forces for more complex situations ==
The lift predicted by the Kutta-Joukowski theorem within the framework of inviscid potential flow theory is quite accurate, even for real viscous flow, provided the flow is steady and unseparated. In deriving the Kutta–Joukowski theorem, the assumption of irrotational flow was used. When there are free vortices outside of the body, as may be the case for a large number of unsteady flows, the flow is rotational. When the flow is rotational, more complicated theories should be used to derive the lift forces. Below are several important examples.

=== Impulsively started flow at small angle of attack ===
For an impulsively started flow such as obtained by suddenly accelerating an airfoil or setting an angle of attack, there is a vortex sheet continuously shed at the trailing edge and the lift force is unsteady or time-dependent. For small angle of attack starting flow, the vortex sheet follows a planar path, and the curve of the lift coefficient as function of time is given by the Wagner function. In this case the initial lift is one half of the final lift given by the Kutta–Joukowski formula. The lift attains 90% of its steady state value when the wing has traveled a distance of about seven chord lengths.

=== Impulsively started flow at large angle of attack ===
When the angle of attack is high enough, the trailing edge vortex sheet is initially in a spiral shape and the lift is singular (infinitely large) at the initial time. The lift drops for a very short time period before the usually assumed monotonically increasing lift curve is reached.

=== Starting flow at large angle of attack for wings with sharp leading edges ===
If, as for a flat plate, the leading edge is also sharp, then vortices also shed at the leading edge and the role of leading edge vortices is two-fold: 1) they are lift increasing when they are still close to the leading edge, so that they elevate the Wagner lift curve, and 2) they are detrimental to lift when they are convected to the trailing edge, inducing a new trailing edge vortex spiral moving in the lift decreasing direction. For this type of flow a vortex force line (VFL) map can be used to understand the effect of the different vortices in a variety of situations (including more situations than starting flow) and may be used to improve vortex control to enhance or reduce the lift. The vortex force line map is a two dimensional map on which vortex force lines are displayed. For a vortex at any point in the flow, its lift contribution is proportional to its speed, its circulation and the cosine of the angle between the streamline and the vortex force line. Hence the vortex force line map clearly shows whether a given vortex is lift producing or lift detrimental.

=== Lagally theorem ===
When a (mass) source is fixed outside the body, a force correction due to this source can be expressed as the product of the strength of outside source and the induced velocity at this source by all the causes except this source. This is known as the Lagally theorem (named after Max Otto Lagally). For two-dimensional inviscid flow, the classical Kutta Joukowski theorem predicts a zero drag. When, however, there is vortex outside the body, there is a vortex induced drag, in a form similar to the induced lift.
Generalized Lagally theorem
For free vortices and other bodies outside one body without bound vorticity and without vortex production, a generalized Lagally theorem holds, with which the forces are expressed as the products of strength of inner singularities (image vortices, sources and doublets inside each body) and the induced velocity at these singularities by all causes except those inside this body. The contribution due to each inner singularity sums up to give the total force. The motion of outside singularities also contributes to forces, and the force component due to this contribution is proportional to the speed of the singularity.

=== Individual force of each body for multiple-body rotational flow ===
When in addition to multiple free vortices and multiple bodies, there are bound vortices and vortex production on the body surface, the generalized Lagally theorem still holds, but a force due to vortex production exists. This vortex production force is proportional to the vortex production rate and the distance between the vortex pair in production. With this approach, an explicit and algebraic force formula, taking into account of all causes (inner singularities, outside vortices and bodies, motion of all singularities and bodies, and vortex production) holds individually for each body with the role of other bodies represented by additional singularities. Hence a force decomposition according to bodies is possible.

=== General three-dimensional viscous flow ===
For general three-dimensional, viscous and unsteady flow, force formulas are expressed in integral forms. The volume integration of certain flow quantities, such as vorticity moments, is related to forces. Various forms of integral approach are now available for unbounded domain and for artificially truncated domain. The Kutta Joukowski theorem can be recovered from these approaches when applied to a two-dimensional airfoil and when the flow is steady and unseparated.

=== Lifting line theory for wings, wing-tip vortices and induced drag ===
A wing has a finite span, and the circulation at any section of the wing varies with the spanwise position. This variation is compensated by the release of streamwise vortices, called trailing vortices, due to conservation of vorticity or Helmholtz's vortex theorems. These streamwise vortices merge to two counter-rotating strong spirals separated by a distance approximately equal to the wingspan; their cores may be visible if relative humidity is high. Treating the trailing vortices as a series of semi-infinite straight line vortices leads to the well-known lifting line theory. By this theory, the wing has a lift force smaller than that predicted by the purely two-dimensional theory of the Kutta–Joukowski theorem. This is due to the upstream effects of the trailing vortices' added downwash on the angle of attack of the wing. This reduces the wing's effective angle of attack, decreasing the amount of lift produced at a given angle of attack and requiring a higher angle of attack to recover this lost lift. At this new higher angle of attack, drag has also increased. Induced drag effectively reduces the slope of the lift curve of a two-dimensional airfoil and increases the angle of attack of $C_{L_\max}$ (while also decreasing the value of $C_{L_\max}$).

== See also ==
- Horseshoe vortex

== Bibliography ==
- Milne-Thomson, L.M. (1973) Theoretical Aerodynamics, Dover Publications Inc, New York
