= Starting vortex =

Vortex around the trailing edge of an airfoil accelerated from rest

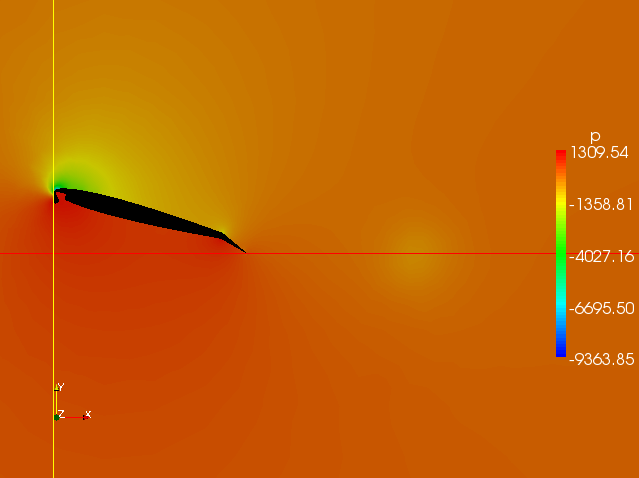
A starting vortex behind a wing profile, made visible by plotting pressure distribution in a CFD simulation.

In fluid dynamics, the starting vortex is a vortex which forms in the air adjacent to the trailing edge of an airfoil as it is accelerated from rest. It leaves the airfoil (which now has an equal but opposite "bound vortex" around it), and remains (nearly) stationary in the flow. It eventually decays through the action of viscosity, but before doing so it contributes significantly to wake turbulence.

The initial (and quite brief) presence of a starting vortex as an airfoil begins to move was predicted by early aerodynamicists, and eventually photographed.

Whenever the speed or angle of attack of an airfoil changes there is a corresponding amount of vorticity deposited in the wake behind the airfoil, joining the two trailing vortices. This vorticity is a continuum of mini-starting-vortexes. The wake behind an aircraft is a continuous sheet of weak vorticity, between the two trailing vortices, and this accounts for the changes in strength of the trailing vortices as the airspeed of the aircraft and angle of attack on the wing change during flight. (The strength of a vortex cannot change within the fluid except by the dissipative action of viscosity. Vortices either form continuous loops of constant strength, or they terminate at the boundary of the fluid - usually a solid surface such as the ground.)

The starting vortex is significant to an understanding of the Kutta condition and its role in the circulation around any airfoil generating lift.

The starting vortex has certain similarities with the "starting plume" which forms at the leading edge of a slug of fluid, when one fluid is injected into another at rest. See plume (hydrodynamics).

== See also ==
- Helmholtz's theorems
- Kutta condition
- Kutta–Joukowski theorem
- Wake turbulence
