= Kutta condition =

Fluid dynamics principle regarding bodies with sharp corners

The Kutta condition is a principle in steady-flow fluid dynamics, especially aerodynamics, that is applicable to solid bodies with sharp corners, such as the trailing edges of airfoils. It is named for German mathematician and aerodynamicist Martin Kutta. Kuethe and Schetzer state the Kutta condition as follows:

A body with a sharp trailing edge which is moving through a fluid will create about itself a circulation of sufficient strength to hold the rear stagnation point at the trailing edge.

In fluid flow around a body with a sharp corner, the Kutta condition refers to the flow pattern in which fluid approaches the corner from above and below, meets at the corner, and then flows away from the body. None of the fluid flows around the sharp corner. The Kutta condition is significant when using the Kutta–Joukowski theorem to calculate the lift created by an airfoil with a sharp trailing edge. The value of circulation of the flow around the airfoil must be that value which would cause the Kutta condition to exist.

== Explaining airfoils ==
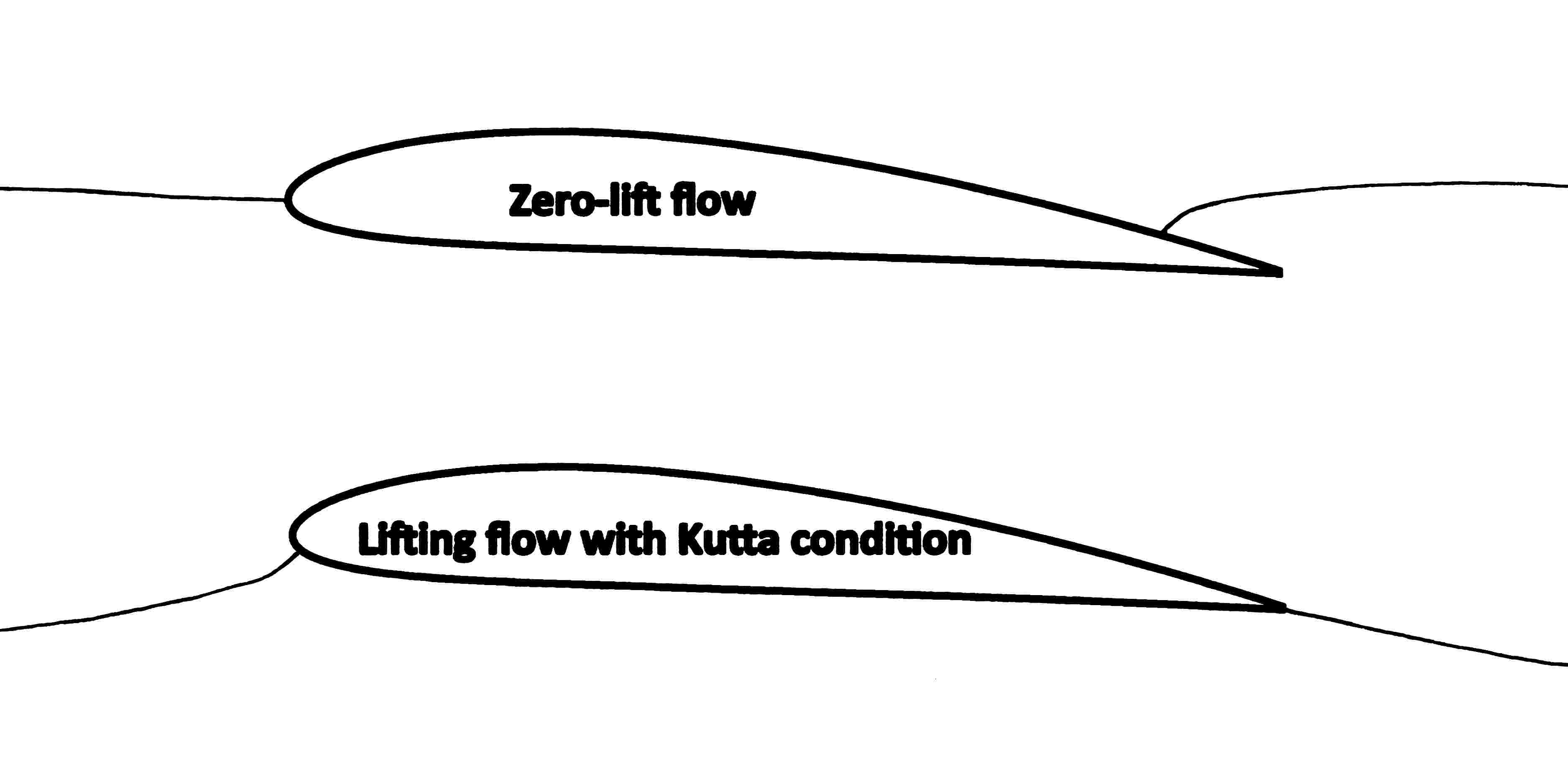
Upper figure: Zero-circulation flow pattern around an airfoil. Lower figure: Flow pattern with circulation consistent with the Kutta condition, in which both the upper and lower flows leave the trailing edge smoothly.

When the Kutta condition is satisfied the flow leaves the trailing edge smoothly

Applying 2-D potential flow, if an airfoil with a sharp trailing edge begins to move with an angle of attack through air, the two stagnation points are initially located on the underside near the leading edge and on the topside near the trailing edge, just as with the cylinder. As the air passing the underside of the airfoil reaches the trailing edge it must flow around the trailing edge and along the topside of the airfoil toward the stagnation point on the topside of the airfoil. Vortex flow occurs at the trailing edge and, because the radius of the sharp trailing edge is zero, the speed of the air around the trailing edge should be infinitely fast. Though real fluids cannot move at infinite speed, they can move very fast. The high airspeed around the trailing edge causes strong viscous forces to act on the air adjacent to the trailing edge of the airfoil and the result is that a strong vortex accumulates on the topside of the airfoil, near the trailing edge. As the airfoil begins to move it carries this vortex, known as the starting vortex, along with it. Pioneering aerodynamicists were able to photograph starting vortices in liquids to confirm their existence.

The vorticity in the starting vortex is matched by the vorticity in the bound vortex in the airfoil, in accordance with Kelvin's circulation theorem. As the vorticity in the starting vortex progressively increases the vorticity in the bound vortex also progressively increases and causes the flow over the topside of the airfoil to increase in speed. The starting vortex is soon cast off the airfoil and is left behind, spinning in the air where the airfoil left it. The stagnation point on the topside of the airfoil then moves until it reaches the trailing edge. The starting vortex eventually dissipates due to viscous forces.

As the airfoil continues on its way, there is a stagnation point at the trailing edge. The flow over the topside conforms to the upper surface of the airfoil. The flow over both the topside and the underside join up at the trailing edge and leave the airfoil travelling parallel to one another. This is known as the Kutta condition.

When an airfoil is moving with an angle of attack, the starting vortex has been cast off and the Kutta condition has become established, there is a finite circulation of the air around the airfoil. The airfoil is generating lift, and the magnitude of the lift is given by the Kutta–Joukowski theorem.

One of the consequences of the Kutta condition is that the airflow over the topside of the airfoil travels much faster than the airflow under the underside. A parcel of air which approaches the airfoil along the stagnation streamline is cleaved in two at the stagnation point, one half traveling over the topside and the other half traveling along the underside. The flow over the topside is so much faster than the flow along the underside that these two halves never meet again. They do not even re-join in the wake long after the airfoil has passed. There is a popular fallacy called the equal transit-time fallacy that claims the two halves rejoin at the trailing edge of the airfoil. This has been understood as a fallacy since Martin Kutta's discovery.

Whenever the speed or angle of attack of an airfoil changes there is a weak starting vortex which begins to form, either above or below the trailing edge. This weak starting vortex causes the Kutta condition to be re-established for the new speed or angle of attack. As a result, the circulation around the airfoil changes and so too does the lift in response to the changed speed or angle of attack.

The Kutta condition gives some insight into why airfoils have sharp trailing edges, even though this is undesirable from structural and manufacturing viewpoints.

In irrotational, inviscid, incompressible flow (potential flow) over an airfoil, the Kutta condition can be implemented by calculating the stream function over the airfoil surface. The same Kutta condition implementation method is also used for solving two dimensional subsonic (subcritical) inviscid steady compressible flows over isolated airfoils. The viscous correction for the Kutta condition can be found in some of the recent studies.

== In aerodynamics ==
The Kutta condition allows an aerodynamicist to incorporate a significant effect of viscosity while neglecting viscous effects in the underlying conservation of momentum equation. It is important in the practical calculation of lift on a wing.

The equations of conservation of mass and conservation of momentum applied to an inviscid fluid flow, such as a potential flow, around a solid body result in an infinite number of valid solutions. One way to choose the correct solution would be to apply the viscous equations, in the form of the Navier–Stokes equations. However, these normally do not result in a closed-form solution. The Kutta condition is an alternative method of incorporating some aspects of viscous effects, while neglecting others, such as skin friction and some other boundary layer effects.

The condition can be expressed in a number of ways. One is that there cannot be an infinite change in velocity at the trailing edge. Although an inviscid fluid can have abrupt changes in velocity, in reality viscosity smooths out sharp velocity changes. If the trailing edge has a non-zero angle, the flow velocity there must be zero. At a cusped trailing edge, however, the velocity can be non-zero although it must still be identical above and below the airfoil. Another formulation is that the pressure must be continuous at the trailing edge.

The Kutta condition does not apply to unsteady flow. Experimental observations show that the stagnation point (one of two points on the surface of an airfoil where the flow speed is zero) begins on the top surface of an airfoil (assuming positive effective angle of attack) as flow accelerates from zero, and moves backwards as the flow accelerates. Once the initial transient effects have died out, the stagnation point is at the trailing edge as required by the Kutta condition.

Mathematically, the Kutta condition enforces a specific choice among the infinite allowed values of circulation.

== See also ==
- Horseshoe vortex
