= Cum sole =

Latin: with the Sun

Cum sole is a Latin phrase meaning with the sun. The term is sometimes used in meteorology and physical oceanography to refer to anticyclonic motion, which is clockwise in the Northern Hemisphere and counterclockwise in the Southern Hemisphere (but with the sun's apparent motion when facing Equator in both hemispheres) (Pond and Pickard, 1983).

The opposite of Cum sole is Contra solem (cyclonic motion). Both terms are infrequently used.

== See also ==
- Anticyclone
- Cyclone
- Circulation (fluid dynamics)
