= Mario Pascal =

Italian mathematician (1896–1949)

Mario Pascal (31 May 1896 – 6 November 1949) was an Italian applied mathematician, specializing in fluid mechanics and aerodynamics.

Pascal was born in Pavia into a family with origins in the French district of Tarascon, Mario Pascal was the son of the mathematician Ernesto Pascal, brother of the mathematician Alberto Pascal, and nephew of the Latinist Carlo Pascal. Mario Pascal studied mathematics at the University of Naples, where he received his laurea in 1919.

He was an assistant in rational mechanics to Roberto Marcolongo and then became at the Istituto Superiore Navale a libero docente in rational mechanics and then a professore incaricato. He then became a professore incaricato at the Accademia Aeronautica of Caserta and there shortly before his death in 1949 was appointed a full professor. His death was due to an illness contracted during WW I.

He dealt almost exclusively with mechanics, especially fluid mechanics, attempting with very limited success to extend the Kutta-Joukowski theorem to three dimensions of space.

He was an Invited Speaker of the ICM in Bologna in 1928.
