= Horseshoe cloud =

Rare type of cumulus cloud

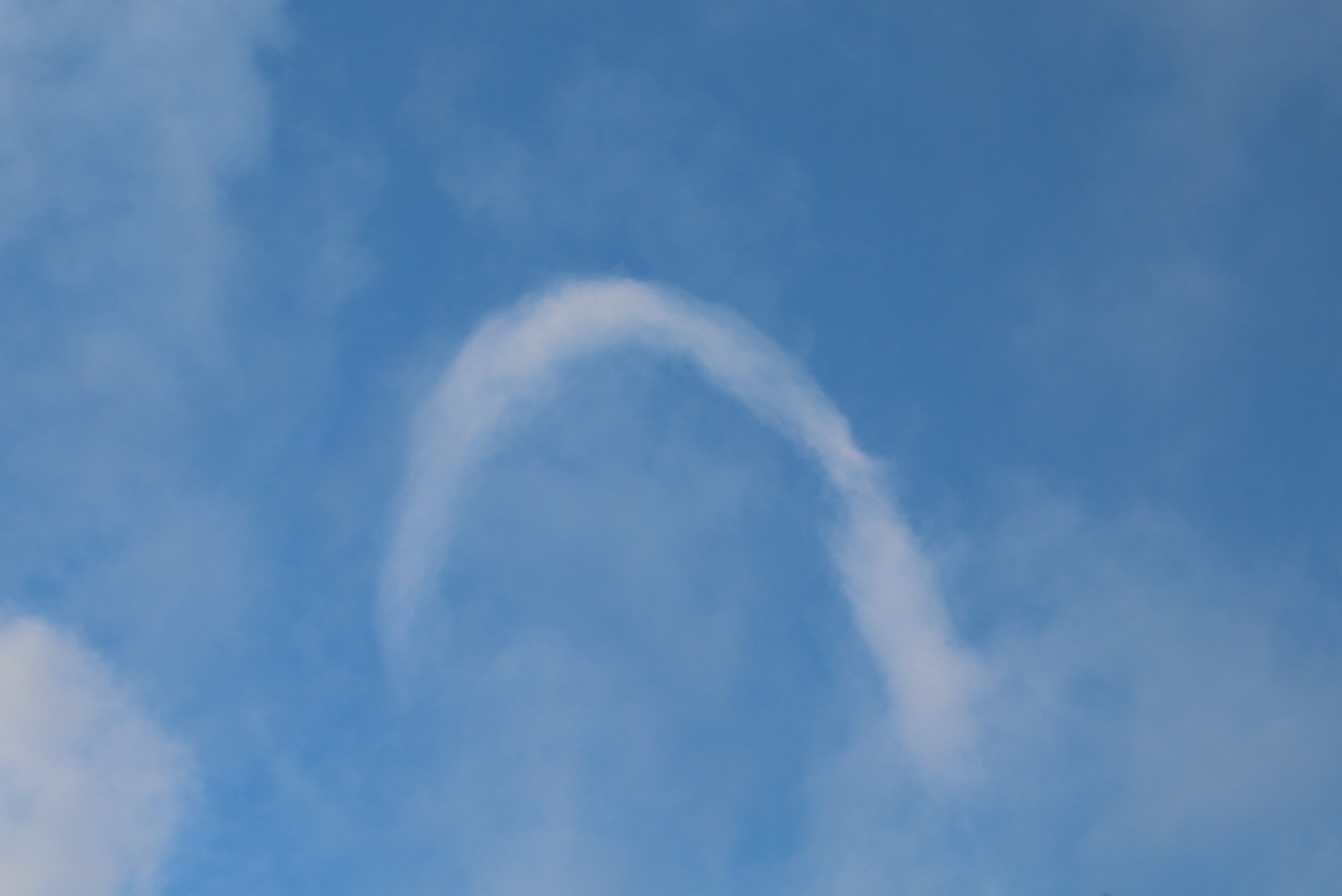
A horseshoe cloud in 2016

A horseshoe cloud is a relatively uncommon meteorological phenomenon which manifests as a cloud in the shape of a horseshoe or inverted letter "U".

They occur when a horseshoe vortex deforms a cumulus cloud. The clouds are relatively short-lived and is the last stage before one dissipates. Horseshoe vortex clouds are a form of "fair-weather" funnel cloud and are similar to the shear funnel type of funnel cloud.

A March 2018 instance was explained by the United States National Weather Service:

As the updraft pushes flattish cumulus clouds up & a horizontal vortex develops from differential updraft speeds... As the vortex climbs, it's caught in the faster horizontal winds aloft, & the middle part of the vortex catches the faster speeds with the ends being slower.

These clouds do not occur often because all the needed conditions rarely occur together.
