= National Gymnasium of Natural Sciences and Mathematics "Academician Lyubomir Chakalov" =

Coordinates: 42°40′13.9″N 23°19′48.32″E

National High School of Mathematics and Natural Sciences
- Национална природо-математическа гимназия

Location
- Bigla str. 52; Sofia; Bulgaria

Information
- Type: Secondary school
- Established: 1968
- Campus Director: Ivaylo Ushagelov
- Campus: Urban
- Website: http://www.npmg.org

The National High School of Mathematics and Natural Sciences "Academician Lyubomir Chakalov" (in Bulgarian: Национална природо-математическа гимназия "Академик Любомир Чакалов") is a high school (European secondary school) in Sofia, Bulgaria. It is located in Lozenets municipality. The school is named after the Bulgarian mathematician Lyubomir Chakalov. More than 1300 students are studying in the school. They are divided into seven majors:

- Mathematics and computer science (52 students, 2 classes with German/English language studying)
- Physics (26 students, 1 class with English)
- Chemistry (52 students, 2 classes with German/English language)
- Chemistry and Biology (26 students, 1 class with English)
- Biology (26 students, 1 class with English)
- Earth science (26 students, 1 class with English)
- Computer science (26 students, 1 class with English)

== History ==
- In September 1964 — At the initiative of the Faculty of Mathematics at Sofia University at the Eighth Polytechnic Secondary School in Sofia, the first mathematics class in the country was opened. The preparation of curricula and training in mathematics is assigned to the lecturers of the Faculty of Mathematics.
- 1966 — for first time students with grade over 5.00 are admitted to the Faculty of Mathematics at Sofia University without an exam.
- September 1968 – the mathematical classes were separated into an independent high school with intensive study of mathematics.
- 1974 – a class with an enhanced study of physics at the Faculty of Physics at Sofia University was opened.
- 1976 – a class with an enhanced study of chemistry at the Faculty of Chemistry was opened.
- 1977 – a class with an enhanced study of biology at the Faculty of Biology was opened.
- 1983 – the reconstruction of the education system in Bulgaria begins. Next year, 2 new classes will be opened – profiles "Biotechnology" and "Earth Sciences".
- 1992 – with the curricula based on the existing classes are formed the current profiles "Mathematics and Informatics" (2 classes), "Physics" (1 class), "Chemistry" (1 class), "Biology and Biotechnology" (2 classes) and "Earth Sciences" (1 class).
- 1993 – for the first time on the initiative of the Rector of Sofia University are prepared Basic Provisions for the joint work of Sofia University and the National High School of Mathematics and Natural Sciences as an Associate Methodological Unit.
- 1994 – by a decision of the Academic Council of Sofia University NPMG was recognized as a natural and mathematical lyceum of Sofia University.

== НПМГ Alumni Club ==
НПМГ Alumni Club was established in 2017. Its mission is to create long-term connections between alumni of the gymnasium, as well as enrich the learning process of current students through lectures, workshops, and other academic and social events.
