= Ljubomir Chakaloff =

Bulgarian mathematician (1886–1963)

Ljubomir Chakaloff (or Lubomir Nikolov Chakalov, Cyrillic: Любомир Николов Чакалов) was a Bulgarian mathematician. He was born in 1886 in Samokov and died in 1963 at the age of 77.

== Education ==
He graduated from Sofia University in June 1908, with an honors degree in mathematics and physics. In 1925, he received a doctoral degree in mathematics from the University of Naples defending a thesis (Le equazioni di Riccati) about Riccati equations, having as advisor Ernesto Pascal.

== Recognitions ==
His main contributions are in the areas of real and complex analysis, number theory, differential equations, elementary mathematics and some work on the arithmetical properties of infinite series.

Lubomir Chakalov was a member of the Royal Czech Academy of Sciences, Warsaw Academy of Sciences, and a permanent member of the Bulgarian Academy of Sciences since 1930. In 1950 he received the Dimitrov Prize and in 1963 he was awarded the title "People's figure of culture."

He was an Invited Speaker of the ICM in 1932 in Zurich and in 1936 in Oslo.

The National Gymnasium of Natural Sciences and Mathematics "Academician Lyubomir Chakalov" is named after him.
