= Ernesto Pascal =

Italian mathematician (1865–1940)

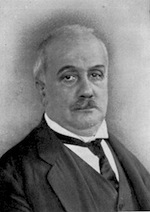
- Born: 7 February 1865; Naples, Italy
- Died: 25 January 1940 (aged 74); Naples, Italy
- Education: University of Naples
- Children: Mario Pascal; Alberto Pascal
- Scientific career
- Fields: Mathematics
- Doctoral students: Renato Caccioppoli; Ljubomir Chakaloff

Ernesto Pascal (1865–1940) was an Italian mathematician.

== Life and work ==
Pascal graduated in mathematics from the University of Naples in 1887. In the following two years he attended courses in the universities of Pisa and Göttingen; in the last one Pascal studied under Felix Klein who influenced him. From 1890 to 1907 he was teaching at the university of Pavia and in 1907 he returned to the university of Naples where he taught until his death. Here, as Dean of the Faculty of Sciences he reorganised the teaching of mathematics, creating for each professorship a laboratory equipped with models and instruments.

Pascal was remembered for his work on elliptic functions based on Jacobi theta function.

== Bibliography ==
- Giacardi, Livia Maria (2010). "The Italian School of Algebraic Geometry and Mathematics Teaching: Methods, Teacher Training, and curricular Reforms in the Early Twentieth Century". International Journal of the History of Mathematics Education. 5 (1): 1–19. ISSN 1932-8826.
- Giacardi, Livia (2013). "Models in mathematics teaching in Italy (1850–1950)" (PDF). In Claude P. Bruter (ed.). MATHEMATICS AND ART III – Proceedings of the Second ESMA Conference. Cassini. pp. 11–38. ISBN 978-2-84225-188-8.
- Ortiz, Javier (2004). "Aproximación histórica a la enseñanza universitaria de las funciones elípticas desde mediados del siglo XIX a comienzos del siglo XX". In Luis Español González; José Javier Escribano Benito; María Angeles Martínez García (eds.). Historia de las ciencias y de las técnicas (in Spanish). Universidad de la Rioja. pp. 885–902. ISBN 84-95301-99-7.
