= Martin Kutta =

German mathematician (1867–1944)

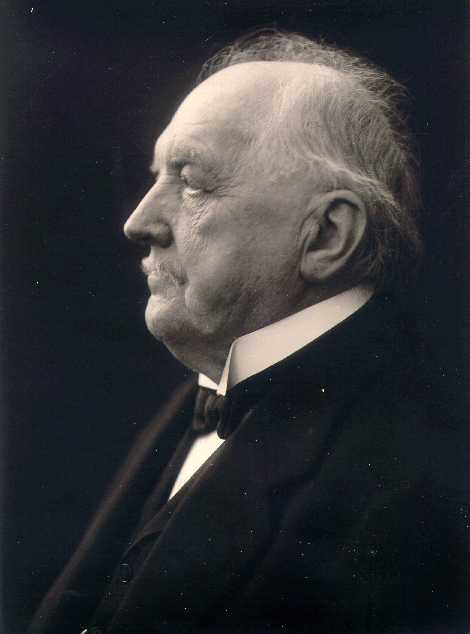
- Martin Kutta (1867–1944)
- Born: 3 November 1867; Pitschen, Upper Silesia
- Died: 25 December 1944 (aged 77); Fürstenfeldbruck
- Education: University of Breslau; Ludwig-Maximilians-Universität München
- Known for: Runge–Kutta method Zhukovsky–Kutta aerofoil Kutta–Joukowski theorem Kutta condition
- Scientific career
- Fields: Mathematician
- Workplaces: University of Stuttgart; RWTH Aachen; University of Jena
- Doctoral advisor: C. L. Ferdinand Lindemann; Gustav A. Bauer
- Other academic advisors: Walther Franz Anton von Dyck

Martin Wilhelm Kutta (German: [ˈkʊta]; 3 November 1867 – 25 December 1944) was a German mathematician. In 1901, he co-developed the Runge–Kutta method, used to solve ordinary differential equations numerically. He is also remembered for the Zhukovsky–Kutta aerofoil, the Kutta–Zhukovsky theorem and the Kutta condition in aerodynamics.

Kutta was born in Pitschen, Upper Silesia, Kingdom of Prussia (today Byczyna, Poland). He attended the University of Breslau from 1885 to 1890, and continued his studies at the Ludwig-Maximilians-Universität München until 1894, where he became the assistant of Walther Franz Anton von Dyck. From 1898, he spent half a year at the University of Cambridge. From 1899 to 1909, he worked again as an assistant of von Dyck at the Ludwig-Maximilians-Universität München; from 1909 to 1910, he was an adjunct professor at the University of Jena. He was professor at the RWTH Aachen from 1910 to 1912. Kutta became professor at the University of Stuttgart in 1912, where he stayed until his retirement in 1935. Kutta died in Fürstenfeldbruck, Germany in 1944.
