= Kelvin's circulation theorem =

Theorem regarding circulation in a barotropic ideal fluid

In fluid mechanics, Kelvin's circulation theorem states:

In a barotropic, ideal fluid with conservative body forces, the circulation around a closed curve (which encloses the same fluid elements) moving with the fluid remains constant with time.

The theorem is named after William Thomson, 1st Baron Kelvin who published it in 1869.

Stated mathematically:

$$\frac{\mathrm{D}\Gamma}{\mathrm{D}t} = 0$$

where $\Gamma$ is the circulation around a material moving contour $C(t)$ as a function of time $t$. The differential operator $\mathrm{D}$ is a substantial (material) derivative moving with the fluid particles. Stated more simply, this theorem says that if one observes a closed contour at one instant, and follows the contour over time (by following the motion of all of its fluid elements), the circulation over the two locations of this contour remains constant.

This theorem does not hold in cases with viscous stresses, nonconservative body forces (for example the Coriolis force) or non-barotropic pressure-density relations.

In the simplifying special case of steady flow the theorem can be applied to a closed curve that has a fixed position so that fluid elements flow through the closed curve. In the study of airfoils producing lift, it is often instructive to examine the circulation around any closed curve that fully encloses the airfoil; in the steady flow of an inviscid fluid past a stationary airfoil, the theorem can be applied to this closed curve.

== Mathematical proof ==
The circulation $\Gamma$ around a closed material contour $C(t)$ is defined by:

$$\Gamma(t) = \oint_C \boldsymbol{u} \cdot \mathrm{d}\boldsymbol{s}$$

where u is the velocity vector, and ds is an element along the closed contour.

The governing equation for an inviscid fluid with a conservative body force is

$$\frac{\mathrm{D} \boldsymbol{u}}{\mathrm{D} t} = - \frac{1}{\rho}\boldsymbol{\nabla}p + \boldsymbol{\nabla} \Phi$$

where D/Dt is the convective derivative, ρ is the fluid density, p is the pressure and Φ is the potential for the body force. These are the Euler equations with a body force.

The condition of barotropicity implies that the density is a function only of the pressure, i.e. $\rho=\rho(p)$.

Taking the convective derivative of circulation gives

$$\frac{\mathrm{D}\Gamma}{\mathrm{D} t} = \oint_C \frac{\mathrm{D} \boldsymbol{u}}{\mathrm{D}t} \cdot \mathrm{d}\boldsymbol{s} + \oint_C \boldsymbol{u} \cdot  \frac{\mathrm{D} \mathrm{d}\boldsymbol{s}}{\mathrm{D}t}.$$

For the first term, we substitute from the governing equation, and then apply Stokes' theorem, thus:

$$\oint_C \frac{\mathrm{D} \boldsymbol{u}}{\mathrm{D}t} \cdot \mathrm{d}\boldsymbol{s} = \int_A \boldsymbol{\nabla} \times \left( -\frac{1}{\rho} \boldsymbol{\nabla} p + \boldsymbol{\nabla} \Phi \right) \cdot \boldsymbol{n} \, \mathrm{d}S =  \int_A \frac{1}{\rho^2} \left( \boldsymbol{\nabla} \rho \times \boldsymbol{\nabla} p \right) \cdot \boldsymbol{n} \, \mathrm{d}S = 0.$$

The final equality arises since $\boldsymbol{\nabla} \rho \times \boldsymbol{\nabla} p=0$ owing to barotropicity. We have also made use of the fact that the curl of any gradient is necessarily 0, or $\boldsymbol{\nabla} \times \boldsymbol{\nabla} f=0$ for any function $f$.

For the second term, we note that evolution of the material line element is given by

$$\frac{\mathrm{D} \mathrm{d}\boldsymbol{s}}{\mathrm{D}t} = \left( \mathrm{d}\boldsymbol{s} \cdot \boldsymbol{\nabla} \right) \boldsymbol{u}.$$

Hence

$$\oint_C \boldsymbol{u} \cdot  \frac{\mathrm{D} \mathrm{d}\boldsymbol{s}}{\mathrm{D}t} = \oint_C \boldsymbol{u} \cdot \left( \mathrm{d}\boldsymbol{s} \cdot \boldsymbol{\nabla} \right) \boldsymbol{u} = \frac{1}{2} \oint_C \boldsymbol{\nabla} \left( |\boldsymbol{u}|^2 \right) \cdot \mathrm{d}\boldsymbol{s} = 0.$$

The last equality is obtained by applying gradient theorem.

Since both terms are zero, we obtain the result

$$\frac{\mathrm{D}\Gamma}{\mathrm{D}t} = 0.$$

== Poincaré–Bjerknes circulation theorem ==
A similar principle which conserves a quantity can be obtained for the rotating frame also, known as the Poincaré–Bjerknes theorem, named after Henri Poincaré and Vilhelm Bjerknes, who derived the invariant in 1893 and 1898. The theorem can be applied to a rotating frame which is rotating at a constant angular velocity given by the vector $\boldsymbol{\Omega}$, for the modified circulation

$$\Gamma(t) = \oint_C (\boldsymbol{u} + \boldsymbol{\Omega} \times \boldsymbol{r}) \cdot \mathrm{d}\boldsymbol{s}$$

Here $\boldsymbol{r}$ is the position of the area of fluid. From Stokes' theorem, this is:

$$\Gamma(t) = \int_A \boldsymbol{\nabla} \times  (\boldsymbol{u} + \boldsymbol{\Omega} \times \boldsymbol{r}) \cdot \boldsymbol{n} \, \mathrm{d}S =  \int_A (\boldsymbol{\nabla} \times \boldsymbol{u} + 2 \boldsymbol{\Omega}) \cdot \boldsymbol{n} \, \mathrm{d}S$$

The vorticity of a velocity field in fluid dynamics is defined by:

$$\boldsymbol{\omega} = \boldsymbol{\nabla} \times \boldsymbol{u}$$

Then:

$$\Gamma(t) = \int_A (\boldsymbol{\omega} + 2 \boldsymbol{\Omega}) \cdot \boldsymbol{n} \, \mathrm{d}S$$

== See also ==
- Bernoulli's principle
- Euler equations (fluid dynamics)
- Helmholtz's theorems
- Thermomagnetic convection
