= Inviscid flow =

Flow of fluids with zero viscosity (superfluids)

In fluid dynamics, inviscid flow is the flow of fluid that is not viscous. The principles of inviscid flow can also be applied to the flow of fluids of low viscosity in regions of the flow field where it is known there is little viscous activity.

The Reynolds number of inviscid flow approaches infinity as the viscosity approaches zero. Where viscous forces are non-existent the Navier–Stokes equations can be simplified to a form known as the Euler equations. This simplified equation is derived by considering an inviscid fluid. Using the Euler equation, many fluid dynamics problems involving low viscosity are easily solved; however, the assumption of negligible viscosity is not valid in the region of the flow field near a solid boundary (the boundary layer) or, more generally in regions with large velocity gradients which are evidently accompanied by viscous forces.

The flow of a superfluid is inviscid.

== Euler equations ==
Inviscid flow around a wing, assuming circulation that achieves the Kutta condition

Euler equations describe the dynamics of inviscid flow, originally published by Leonhard Euler in 1757. This equations are the following

$${D\rho\over Dt} +\rho\nabla\cdot \mathbf v=0;$$
$$\rho{D\mathbf{v} \over Dt} = -\nabla p +\rho \mathbf{g}\,;$$
$$\rho=h(p),$$

where

Symbol	Description	Units
${D \over Dt}$	material derivative
$\nabla$	gradient
$\nabla\cdot$	divergence
$p$	pressure	Pa
$\mathbf{g}$	acceleration vector due to gravity	m/s^{2}
$h(p)$	A function of pressure	Pa

The first equation is the continuity equation related to the conservation of mass. The second equation is the equivalent of Newton's second law of motion for fluids. The third equation is an equation of state and must be introduced to obtain a self-consisted system of equations, fluids following this relations are called homoentropic and applies to most fluids with uniform composition.

If the fluid is incompressible, the first equation reduces to the condition that the fluid is solenoidal, $\nabla\cdot\mathbf v=0$.

Assuming inviscid flow allows the Euler equations to be applied to flows in which viscous forces are insignificant. Some examples include flow around an airplane wing, upstream flow around bridge supports in a river, and ocean currents.

=== Derivation from Navier–Stokes equations ===
In 1845, George Gabriel Stokes published another important set of equations, today known as the Navier–Stokes equations. Claude-Louis Navier developed the equations first using molecular theory, which was further confirmed by Stokes using continuum theory. The Navier–Stokes equations describe the motion of fluids:

$$\rho{D\mathbf{v} \over Dt} = -\nabla p + \mu \nabla^2 \mathbf{v} +\rho \mathbf{g}.$$

When the fluid is inviscid, or the viscosity can be assumed to be negligible, the Navier–Stokes equations simplifies to the Euler equations: This simplification is much easier to solve, and can apply to many types of flow in which viscosity is negligible. Some examples include flow around an airplane wing, upstream flow around bridge supports in a river, and ocean currents.

The Navier–Stokes equation reduces to the Euler equations when $\mu=0$. Another condition that leads to the elimination of viscous force is $\nabla^2\mathbf{v}=0$, and this results in an "inviscid flow arrangement". Such flows are found to be vortex-like.

== Applicability ==
=== Reynolds number ===
The Reynolds number (Re) is a dimensionless quantity that is commonly used in fluid dynamics and engineering. Originally described by George Gabriel Stokes in 1850, it became popularized by Osborne Reynolds after whom the concept was named by Arnold Sommerfeld in 1908. The Reynolds number is calculated as:

$$\mathrm{Re} = {l_c v \rho \over \mu}$$

Symbol	Description	Units
$l_c$	characteristic length	m
$v$	fluid velocity	m/s
$\rho$	fluid density	kg/m^{3}
$\mu$	fluid viscosity	Pa*s

The value represents the ratio of inertial forces to viscous forces in a fluid, and is useful in determining the relative importance of viscosity. In inviscid flow, since the viscous forces are zero, the Reynolds number approaches infinity. When viscous forces are negligible, the Reynolds number is much greater than one. In such cases (Re>>1), assuming inviscid flow can be useful in simplifying many fluid dynamics problems.

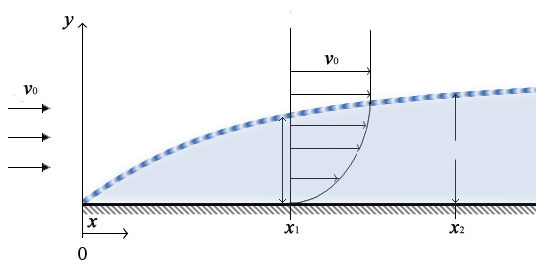
Flow developing over a solid surface

=== Solid boundaries ===
Negligible viscosity can no longer be assumed near solid boundaries, such as the case of the airplane wing. In turbulent flow regimes (Re >> 1), viscosity can typically be neglected, however this is only valid at distances far from solid interfaces. When considering flow in the vicinity of a solid surface, such as flow through a pipe or around a wing, it is convenient to categorize four distinct regions of flow near the surface:

- Main turbulent stream: Furthest from the surface, viscosity can be neglected.
- Inertial sub-layer: The start of the main turbulent stream, viscosity has only minor importance.
- Buffer layer: The transformation between inertial and viscous layers.
- Viscous sub-layer: Closest to the surface, here viscosity is important.

Although these distinctions can be a useful tool in illustrating the significance of viscous forces near solid interfaces, these regions are fairly arbitrary. Assuming inviscid flow can be a useful tool in solving many fluid dynamics problems, however, this assumption requires careful consideration of the fluid sub layers when solid boundaries are involved.

==== Prandtl hypothesis ====
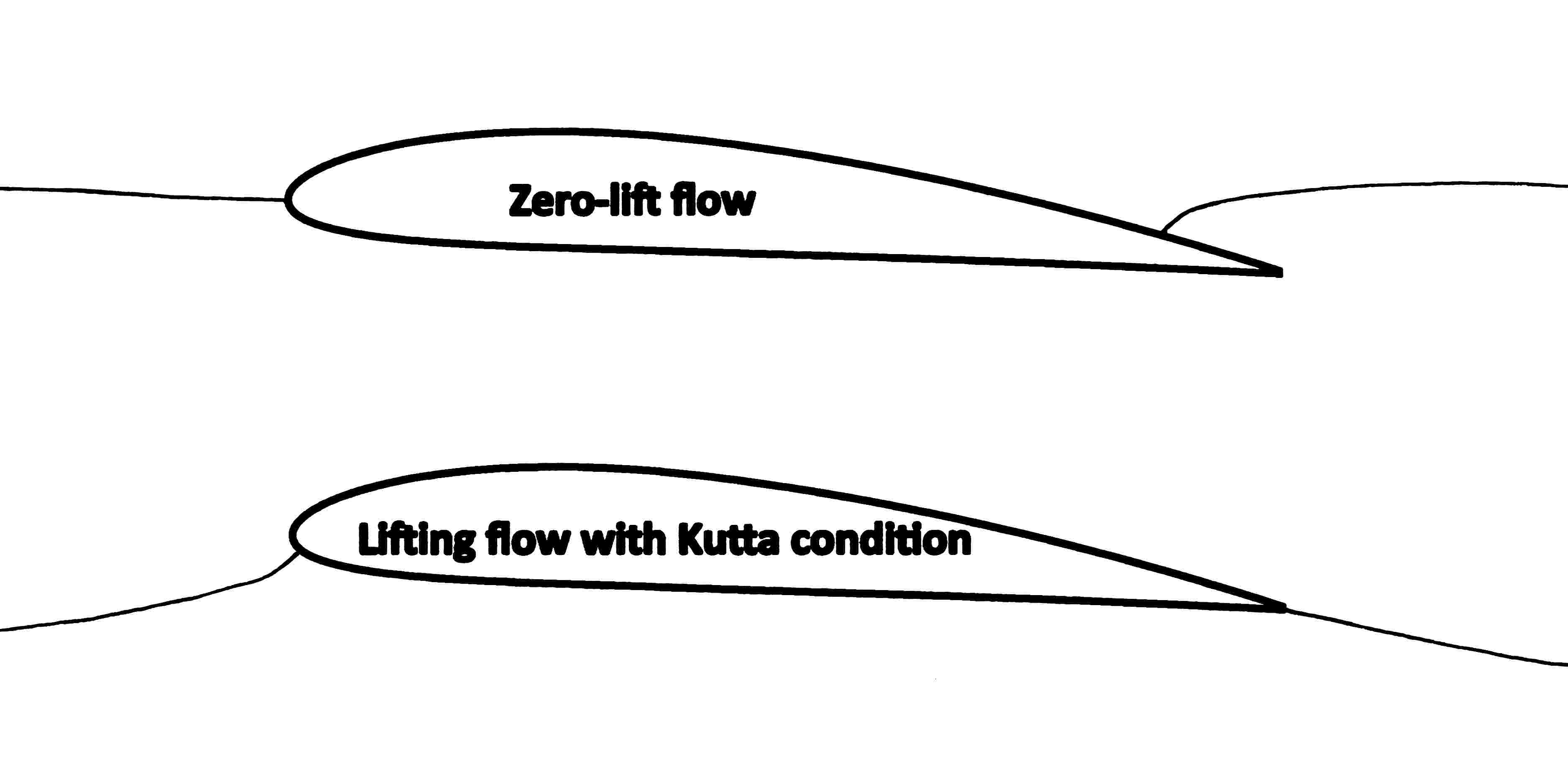
These diagrams show the dividing streamlines associated with an airfoil in two-dimensional inviscid flow. The upper diagram shows zero circulation and zero lift. It implies high-speed vortex flow at the trailing edge which is known to be inaccurate in a model of the steady state. The lower diagram shows the Kutta condition which implies finite circulation, finite lift, and no vortex flow at the trailing edge. These characteristics are known to be accurate as models of the steady state in a real fluid.

Ludwig Prandtl developed the modern concept of the boundary layer. His hypothesis establishes that for fluids of low viscosity, shear forces due to viscosity are evident only in thin regions at the boundary of the fluid, adjacent to solid surfaces. Outside these regions, and in regions of favorable pressure gradient, viscous shear forces are absent so the fluid flow field can be assumed to be the same as the flow of an inviscid fluid. By employing the Prandtl hypothesis it is possible to estimate the flow of a real fluid in regions of favorable pressure gradient by assuming inviscid flow and investigating the irrotational flow pattern around the solid body.

Real fluids experience separation of the boundary layer and resulting turbulent wakes but these phenomena cannot be modelled using inviscid flow. Separation of the boundary layer usually occurs where the pressure gradient reverses from favorable to adverse so it is inaccurate to use inviscid flow to estimate the flow of a real fluid in regions of unfavorable pressure gradient.

== Paradoxes ==
Treating real fluids as non viscous is a good approximation at high Reynolds number, but it is not always realistic as this treatment leads to physical paradoxes. The most common is d'Alembert's paradox which shows that ideal fluids can exert neither shear forces nor pressure on other solids.

== Superfluids ==
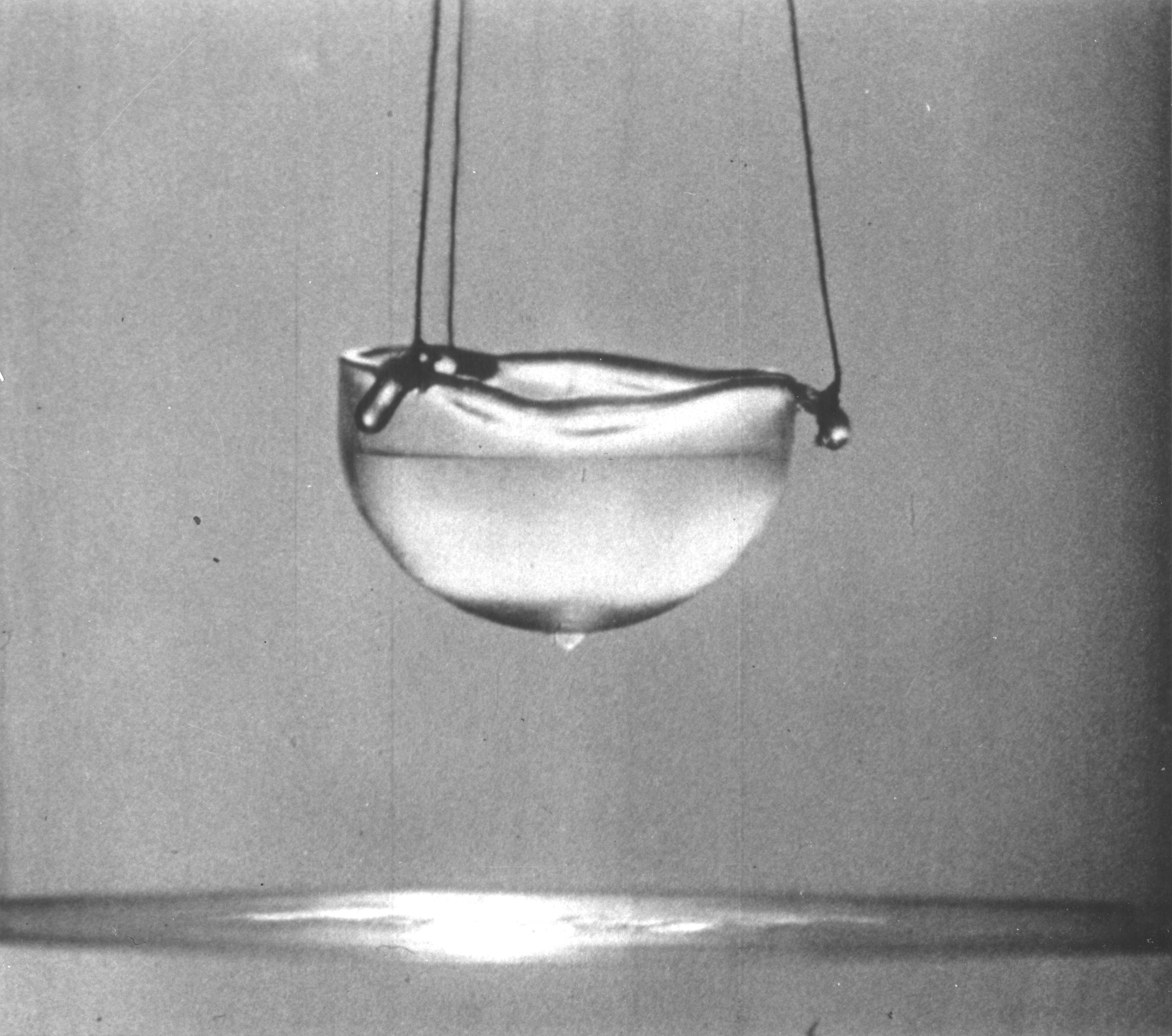
Superfluid helium

Superfluid is the state of matter that exhibits frictionless flow, zero viscosity, also known as inviscid flow.

To date, helium is the only fluid to exhibit superfluidity that has been discovered. Helium-4 becomes a superfluid once it is cooled to below 2.2K, a point known as the lambda point. At temperatures above the lambda point, helium exists as a liquid exhibiting normal fluid dynamic behavior. Once it is cooled to below 2.2K it begins to exhibit quantum behavior. For example, at the lambda point there is a sharp increase in heat capacity, as it is continued to be cooled, the heat capacity begins to decrease with temperature. In addition, the thermal conductivity is very large, contributing to the excellent coolant properties of superfluid helium. Similarly, Helium-3 is found become a superfluid at 2.491mK.

=== Applications ===
Spectrometers are kept at a very low temperature using helium as the coolant. This allows for minimal background flux in far-infrared readings. Some of the designs for the spectrometers may be simple, but even the frame is at its warmest less than 20 Kelvin. These devices are not commonly used as it is very expensive to use superfluid helium over other coolants.

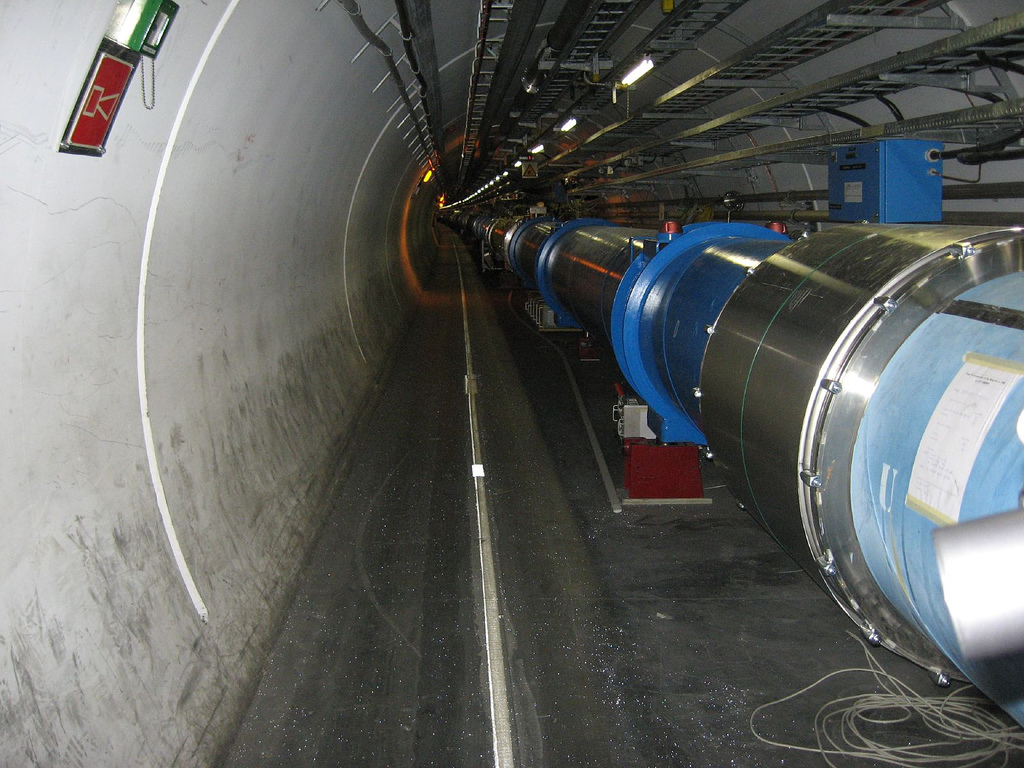
Large Hadron Collider

Superfluid helium has a very high thermal conductivity, which makes it very useful for cooling superconductors. Superconductors such as the ones used at the Large Hadron Collider (LHC) are cooled to temperatures of approximately 1.9 Kelvin. This temperature allows the niobium-titanium magnets to reach a superconductor state. Without the use of the superfluid helium, this temperature would not be possible. Using helium to cool to these temperatures is very expensive and cooling systems that use alternative fluids are more numerous.

Another application of the superfluid helium is its uses in understanding quantum mechanics. Using lasers to look at small droplets allows scientists to view behaviors that may not normally be viewable. This is due to all the helium in each droplet being at the same quantum state. This application does not have any practical uses by itself, but it helps us better understand quantum mechanics which has its own applications.

== See also ==
- Couette flow
- Fluid dynamics
- Potential flow, a special case of inviscid flow
- Stokes flow, in which the viscous forces are much greater than inertial forces.
- Viscosity
