= Chilton =

Chilton may refer to:

== People ==
- Chilton (surname)
- Chilton (given name)

== Places ==
=== England ===
- Chilton, Buckinghamshire, a village and civil parish
- Chilton, County Durham, a town
- Chilton, Kent, a location
- Chilton, Oxfordshire, a village and civil parish
- Chilton, Suffolk, a civil parish

=== United States ===
- Chilton, Missouri, an unincorporated community
- Gaylor, Missouri, an unincorporated community formerly named Chilton
- Chilton, Texas, a census-designated place and unincorporated community
- Chilton (town), Wisconsin
  - Chilton, Wisconsin, a city partly within the town
- Chilton County, Alabama
- Lake Chilton, Avon Park Lakes, Florida

== Other uses ==
- USS Chilton, a World War II attack transport
- Chilton Club, a private social club in Boston, Massachusetts, United States
- Chilton Memorial Hospital, Pequannock Township, New Jersey, United States
- Chilton High School (disambiguation)
- Frederick Chilton, a fictional character in Thomas Harris's Red Dragon and The Silence of the Lambs
- Chilton Academy, a fictional prep school in the TV series Gilmore Girls
- Chilton Aircraft, a British aircraft manufacturer
- Chilton Company, a publisher commonly known for their automotive maintenance manuals
- 2221 Chilton, an asteroid

== See also ==
- Chilton House, St. Albans, West Virginia, United States, on the National Register of Historic Places
- Chilton Hall, Chilton, Suffolk, England
- Chilton Lodge, Leverton, Berkshire, England, a country house
- Chilton Priory, near Chilton Polden, Somerset, England, later a country house
- Chilton Chine a geological feature on the south-west coast of the Isle of Wight, England
- Chilton Lane, County Durham
- Chilton Moor, Country Durham
- Great Chilton, County Durham
- Chilton Candover, Hampshire
- Chilton Cantelo, Somerset
- Chilton Trinity, Somerset
- Chilton Polden, Somerset
- Chilton Street, Suffolk
- Chilton Foliat, Wiltshire
- Chiltons, Virginia, United States, an unincorporated community
- Chiltern (disambiguation)
- Shilton (disambiguation)
