= Chilton (surname) =

Chilton is an English surname. Notable people with the surname include:

- Alex Chilton (1950–2010), American singer-songwriter, guitarist, record producer, the lead singer of the Box Tops
- Allenby Chilton (1918–1996), English football player
- Bart Chilton (1960–2019), commissioner on the Commodity Futures Trading Commission
- Charles Chilton (1917–2013), BBC radio presenter, a writer and a producer
- Charles Chilton (zoologist) (1860–1929), New Zealand
- Chris Chilton (1943–2021), British footballer
- David Chilton (1951–1997), pastor and Christian Reconstructionist
- David Barr Chilton, Canadian financial author
- Emelie C. S. Chilton (1838–1864), American poet, magazine editor
- Frederick Oliver Chilton Australian brigadier
- Glen Chilton, Canadian-Australian professor, author, ornithologist and behavioural ecologist
- Horace Chilton (1853–1932), printer, lawyer, and Democratic US Senator from Texas
- James Chilton (c. 1556 – 1620), Mayflower settler
- John Chilton (1932–2016), British jazz trumpeter and writer
- Kevin Patrick "Chily" Chilton (born 1954), 4-star general in the USAF and NASA astronaut
- Mark Chilton (born 1976), British cricketer
- Mark H. Chilton (born 1970), mayor of Carrboro, North Carolina
- Mary Chilton (1607 – c. 1679), passenger on the Mayflower
- Mary-Dell Chilton (born 1939), one of the founders of modern plant biotechnology
- Maurice Chilton (1898–1956) British Army officer
- Max Chilton (born 1991) British racing driver competing in Formula 1
- Robert H. Chilton (1815–1879), brigadier general in the Confederate States Army during the American Civil War; chief of staff for Robert E. Lee
- Selina Chilton (born 1981), English actress
- Shirley Chilton (1923–2013), American businesswoman and politician
- Thomas Chilton (1798–1854), U.S. Representative from Kentucky, Baptist clergyman, ghostwriter of David Crockett's autobiography
- Thomas H. Chilton (1899–1972), chemical engineer and professor
- Tom Chilton (born 1985), British auto racing driver
- Tom Chilton (game developer) for the World of Warcraft game
- William Chilton (printer) (1815–1855), British printer, socialist, atheist, and evolutionist
- William E. Chilton (1856–1939), United States Senator from West Virginia
- William Parish Chilton (1810–1871), lawyer, jurist, and politician serving Alabama and later the Confederate States of America
