= List of United States representatives in the 64th Congress =

This is a complete list of United States representatives during the 64th United States Congress listed by seniority. For the most part, representatives are ranked by the beginning of their terms in office.

As an historical article, the districts and party affiliations listed reflect those during the 64th Congress (March 4, 1915 – March 3, 1917). Seats and party affiliations on similar lists for other congresses will be different for certain members.

This article describes the criteria for seniority in the House of Representatives and sets out the list of members by seniority. It is prepared on the basis of the interpretation of seniority applied to the House of Representatives in the current congress. In the absence of information to the contrary, it is presumed that the twenty-first-century practice is identical to the seniority customs used during the 64th Congress.

== Seniority ==
=== House seniority ===
Seniority in the House, for representatives with unbroken service, depends on the date on which the members first term began. That date is either the start of the Congress (4 March in odd numbered years, for the era up to and including the 73rd Congress starting in 1933) or the date of a special election during the Congress. Since many members start serving on the same day as others, ranking between them is based on alphabetical order by the last name of the representative.

Representatives who return to the House, after having previously served, are credited with service equal to one less than the total number of terms they served. When a representative has served a prior term of less than two terms (i.e., prior term minus one equals less than one), he is ranked above all others whose service begins on the same day.

=== Committee seniority ===
Until 1910, House committee members and chairmen were selected by the Speaker, who also ranked the members of the committee. Seniority on the committee was just one of the factors that was taken into account in ranking the members. In the 61st Congress, Speaker Cannon (R-IL) had used his power to change committee assignments to demote and punish insurgent Republicans. In March 1910 the Speaker was stripped of his powers over the composition of standing committees.

As a result of the events of 1910, at the start of the 64th Congress in 1915, the committee assignments were made by each party and then formally approved by the whole House. Each party controlled the committee ranking of its members, but usually this followed the order of seniority of members in terms of service on the committee. It became customary for members of a committee, in the previous congress, to be re-appointed at the start of the next.

A seniority rule was normally used to decide committee chairmen, similar to that which the Senate had usually followed since 1846. The chairman was likely to be the majority member of a committee, with the longest continuous service on it. However, party leadership was typically not associated with seniority.

Out of the group of fifty six standing committee chairmen, at the start of this Congress, Nelson Polsby identified fifty as the most senior member of the majority on the committee. In the other six cases, all senior majority members were compensated for not being chairman of the committee (three chaired another committee and three received better committee assignments than in the previous Congress). Thus in no instance was the seniority custom violated, without obvious compensation for the representative passed over.

== Committees ==
This list refers to the standing committees of the House in the 64th Congress, the year of establishment as a standing committee (adoption of the name used in 1915), the number of members assigned to the committee and the corresponding committee in the current congress. Because of consolidation of committees and changes of jurisdiction, it is not always possible to identify a clear successor panel.

No.	1915 committee	Established	Members	2011 committee
1	Accounts	1805	11	House Administration
2	Agriculture	1820	21	Agriculture
3	Alcoholic Liquor Traffic	1893	11	Judiciary
4	Appropriations	1865	21	Appropriations
5	Banking and Currency	1865	21	Financial Services
6	Census	1901	16	Oversight and Government Reform
7	Claims	1794	16	Judiciary
8	Coinage, Weights and Measures	1864 (1867)	18	Financial Services
9	Disposition of Executive Papers	1911	2	House Administration
10	District of Columbia	1808	21	Oversight and Government Reform
11	Education	1867 (1883)	15	Education and the Workforce
12	Election of President, Vice President and Representatives	1893	13	House Administration
13	Elections No. 1	1789 (1895)	9	House Administration
14	Elections No. 2	1895	9	House Administration
15	Elections No. 3	1895	9	House Administration
16	Enrolled Bills	1876	7	House Administration
17	Expenditures in the Agriculture Department	1889	7	Oversight and Government Reform
18	Expenditures in the Commerce Department	1903 (1913)	7	Oversight and Government Reform
19	Expenditures in the Interior Department	1860	7	Oversight and Government Reform
20	Expenditures in the Justice Department	1874	7	Oversight and Government Reform
21	Expenditures in the Labor Department	1913	7	Oversight and Government Reform
22	Expenditures in the Navy Department	1816	7	Oversight and Government Reform
23	Expenditures in the Post Office Department	1816	7	Oversight and Government Reform
24	Expenditures in the State Department	1816	7	Oversight and Government Reform
25	Expenditures in the Treasury Department	1816	7	Oversight and Government Reform
26	Expenditures in the War Department	1816	7	Oversight and Government Reform
27	Expenditures on Public Buildings	1816	7	Oversight and Government Reform
28	Foreign Affairs	1822	21	Foreign Affairs
29	Immigration and Naturalization	1893	15	Judiciary
30	Indian Affairs	1821	19	Natural Resources
31	Industrial Arts and Expositions	1903	16	Foreign Affairs
32	Insular Affairs	1899	21	Natural Resources
33	Interstate and Foreign Commerce	1795 (1892)	21	Energy and Commerce
34	Invalid Pensions	1831	16	Veterans' Affairs
35	Irrigation of Arid Lands	1893	13	Natural Resources
36	Judiciary	1813	21	Judiciary
37	Labor	1883	13	Education and the Workforce
38	Merchant Marine and Fisheries	1887	21	...
39	Mileage	1837	5	House Administration
40	Military Affairs	1822	21	Armed Services
41	Mines and Mining	1865	14	Natural Resources
42	Naval Affairs	1822	21	Armed Services
43	Patents	1837	14	Judiciary
44	Pensions	1880	15	Veterans' Affairs
45	Post Office and Post Roads	1808	21	Oversight and Government Reform
46	Public Buildings and Grounds	1837	17	Transportation and Infrastructure
47	Public Lands	1805	21	Natural Resources
48	Railways and Canals	1831 (1869)	14	Transportation and Infrastructure
49	Reform in the Civil Service	1893	13	Oversight and Government Reform
50	Revision of Laws	1868	13	Judiciary
51	Rivers and Harbors	1883	21	Transportation and Infrastructure
52	Roads	1913	21	Transportation and Infrastructure
53	Rules	1880	11	Rules
54	Territories	1825	16	Natural Resources
55	War Claims	1825 (1873)	15	Judiciary
56	Ways and Means	1802	22	Ways and Means
Joint Committees (House standing committee members only)
Jt 1	Library Joint	1806	5	House Administration
Jt 2	Printing Joint	1846	3	House Administration

== List of representatives by seniority ==
A numerical rank is assigned to each of the 435 members initially elected to the 64th Congress. The seniority date given is the start of the current period of continuous service and past non-continuous terms are recorded in the notes. Other members, who joined the House during the Congress, are not assigned a number. Three Representatives-elect died before the Congress started. The list below includes those Representatives-elect (with names in italics), with the seniority they would have held if they had survived to be sworn in.

Major party designations used in this article are D for Democratic members and R for Republican representatives. Other designations include Ind for Independent, Prog for Progressive, Proh for Prohibition and Soc for Socialist.

U.S. House seniority
Rank	Representative	Party	District	Seniority date	Notes
Twenty non-consecutive terms
1	Joseph G. Cannon	R	IL-18	March 4, 1915	Previously served 1873-91 and 1893–1913 while in the House.
Sixteen non-consecutive terms
2	Sereno E. Payne	R	NY-36	December 2, 1889	Previously served 1883-87 while in the House. Died as Representative-elect; December 10, 1914.
Thirteen consecutive terms
3	William A. Jones	D	VA-1	March 4, 1891	Dean of the House. Chairman: Insular Affairs.
Twelve consecutive terms
4	Henry A. Cooper	R	WI-1	March 4, 1893	
5	Frederick H. Gillett	R	MA-2	March 4, 1893	
Eleven consecutive terms
6	Stephen M. Sparkman	D	FL-1	March 4, 1895	Chairman: Rivers and Harbors. Last term while in the House.
Eleven non-consecutive terms
7	James B. (Champ) Clark	D	MO-9	March 4, 1897	Speaker of the House. Previously served 1893-95 while in the House.
Ten consecutive terms
8	William C. Adamson	D	GA-4	March 4, 1897	Chairman: Interstate and Foreign Commerce
9	Thomas S. Butler	R	PA-7	March 4, 1897	Independent Republican, 1897–99
10	Edward L. Hamilton	R	MI-4	March 4, 1897	
11	James Hay	D	VA-7	March 4, 1897	Chairman: Military Affairs. Resigned on October 1, 1916, while in the House.
12	Robert L. Henry	D	TX-11	March 4, 1897	Chairman: Rules. Last term while serving in the House.
13	James R. Mann	R	IL-2	March 4, 1897	Minority Leader
14	John A. Moon	D	TN-3	March 4, 1897	Chairman: Post Office and Post Roads
15	Thetus W. Sims	D	TN-8	March 4, 1897	
16	James L. Slayden	D	TX-14	March 4, 1897	
17	John H. Stephens	D	TX-13	March 4, 1897	Chairman: Indian Affairs. Last term while serving in the House.
18	James T. Lloyd	D	MO-1	June 1, 1897	Chairman: Accounts. Last term while serving in the House.
19	William S. Greene	R	MA-15	May 31, 1898	Republican Conference Chairman
Ten non-consecutive terms
20	George E. Foss	R	IL-10	March 4, 1915	Previously served 1895–1913 while in the House.
21	Ebenezer J. Hill	R	CT-4	March 4, 1915	Previously served 1895–1913 while in the House.
22	Frank W. Mondell	R	WY-al	March 4, 1899	Previously served 1895-97 while in the House.
23	Cyrus A. Sulloway	R	NH-1	March 4, 1915	Previously served 1895–1913 while in the House.
24	Richard W. Parker	D	NJ-9	December 1, 1914	Previously served 1895–1911 while in the House.
Nine consecutive terms
25	John L. Burnett	D	AL-7	March 4, 1899	Chairman: Immigration and Naturalization
26	John J. Esch	R	WI-7	March 4, 1899	
27	David E. Finley	D	SC-5	March 4, 1899	Died on January 26, 1917, while still serving in the House.
28	John J. Fitzgerald	D	NY-7	March 4, 1899	Chairman: Appropriations
29	Joseph W. Fordney	R	MI-8	March 4, 1899	
30	Gilbert N. Haugen	R	IA-4	March 4, 1899	
31	Ernest W. Roberts	R	MA-9	March 4, 1899	Last term while still serving in the House.
32	William W. Rucker	D	MO-2	March 4, 1899	Chairman: Election of President, Vice President and Representatives
33	John H. Small	D	NC-1	March 4, 1899	
34	Dorsey W. Shackleford	D	MO-8	August 29, 1899	Chairman: Roads
Eight consecutive terms
35	George F. Burgess	D	TX-9	March 4, 1901	Last term while still serving in the House.
36	Ezekiel S. Candler, Jr.	D	MS-1	March 4, 1901	
37	Henry D. Flood	D	VA-10	March 4, 1901	Chairman: Foreign Affairs
38	Joseph T. Johnson	D	SC-4	March 4, 1901	Resigned to become a US District Judge: April 19, 1915
39	Claude Kitchin	D	NC-2	March 4, 1901	Chairman: Ways and Means. Majority Leader.
40	Lemuel P. Padgett	D	TN-7	March 4, 1901	Chairman: Naval Affairs
41	Edward W. Pou	D	NC-4	March 4, 1901	Chairman: Claims
42	Asbury F. Lever	D	SC-7	November 5, 1901	Chairman: Agriculture
43	Augustus P. Gardner	R	MA-6	November 4, 1902	
44	Carter Glass	D	VA-6	November 4, 1902	Chairman: Banking and Currency
Eight non-consecutive terms
45	Julius Kahn	R	CA-4	March 4, 1905	Previously served 1899–1903 while in the House.
46	J. Frederick Talbott	D	MD-2	March 4, 1909	Previously served 1879-85 and 1893–95 while in the House.
Seven consecutive terms
47	Wyatt Aiken	D	SC-3	March 4, 1903	Last term while serving in the House.
48	Philip P. Campbell	R	KS-3	March 4, 1903	
49	Charles R. Davis	R	MN-3	March 4, 1903	
50	John N. Garner	D	TX-15	March 4, 1903	
51	Alexander W. Gregg	D	TX-7	March 4, 1903	Chairman: War Claims
52	Joseph Howell	R	UT-1	March 4, 1903	Last term while serving in the House.
53	William E. Humphrey	R	WA-1	March 4, 1903	Last term while serving in the House.
54	Benjamin G. Humphreys	D	MS-3	March 4, 1903	Chairman: Flood Control
55	Moses P. Kinkaid	R	NE-6	March 4, 1903	
56	Robert N. Page	D	NC-7	March 4, 1903	Last term while serving in the House.
57	Henry T. Rainey	D	IL-20	March 4, 1903	
58	J. Swagar Sherley	D	KY-5	March 4, 1903	
59	William R. Smith	D	TX-16	March 4, 1903	Chairman: Irrigation of Arid Lands. Last term while serving in the House.
60	Halvor Steenerson	R	MN-9	March 4, 1903	
61	Andrew J. Volstead	R	MN-7	March 4, 1903	
62	Edwin Y. Webb	D	NC-9	March 4, 1903	Chairman: Judiciary
63	J. Thomas Heflin	D	AL-5	May 19, 1904	
Seven non-consecutive terms
64	William A. Rodenberg	R	IL-22	March 4, 1915	Previously served 1899-1901 and 1903–13 while in the House.
65	Daniel J. Riordan	D	NY-11	November 6, 1906	Previously served 1899–1901 while in the House.
Six consecutive terms
66	Andrew J. Barchfeld	R	PA-32	March 4, 1905	Last term while serving in the House.
67	Thomas M. Bell	D	GA-9	March 4, 1905	
68	Frank Clark	D	FL-2	March 4, 1905	Chairman: Public Buildings and Grounds
69	Lincoln Dixon	D	IN-4	March 4, 1905	
70	Finis J. Garrett	D	TN-9	March 4, 1905	
71	Everis A. Hayes	R	CA-8	March 4, 1905	
72	William C. Houston	D	TN-5	March 4, 1905	Chairman: Territories
73	Gordon Lee	D	GA-7	March 4, 1905	
74	Martin B. Madden	R	IL-1	March 4, 1905	
75	John T. Watkins	D	LA-4	March 4, 1905	Chairman: Revision of Laws
76	John M. Nelson	R	WI-3	September 4, 1906	
77	J. Hampton Moore	R	PA-3	November 6, 1906	
78	Edward W. Saunders	D	VA-5	November 6, 1906	Democratic Caucus Chairman
Six non-consecutive terms
79	Charles E. Fuller	R	IL-12	March 4, 1915	Previously served 1903-13 while in the House.
80	Joseph A. Goulden	D	NY-23	March 4, 1913	Previously served 1903–11. Died May 3, 1915, while still serving in the House.
81	Courtney W. Hamlin	D	MO-7	March 4, 1907	Previously served 1903-05 while in the House. Chairman: Expenditures in the State Department
82	Daniel F. Lafean	R	PA-al	March 4, 1915	Previously served 1903-13 while in the House. Last term while serving in the House.
83	Nicholas Longworth	R	OH-1	March 4, 1915	Previously served 1903-13 while in the House.
84	George A. Loud	R	MI-10	March 4, 1915	Previously served 1903-13 while in the House. Last term while serving in the House.
85	Isaac R. Sherwood	D	OH-9	March 4, 1907	Previously served (R) 1873-75 while in the House. Chairman: Invalid Pensions.
86	William H. Stafford	R	WI-5	March 4, 1913	Previously served 1903-11 while in the House.
87	John A. Sterling	R	IL-17	March 4, 1915	Previously served 1903-13 while in the House.
88	William W. Wilson	R	IL-3	March 4, 1915	Previously served 1903-13 while in the House.
89	Charles F. Booher	D	MO-4	March 4, 1907	Previously served February 19-March 3, 1889, while in the House.
Five consecutive terms
90	John A. M. Adair	D	IN-8	March 4, 1907	Last term while serving in the House.
91	Joshua W. Alexander	D	MO-3	March 4, 1907	Chairman: Merchant Marine and Fisheries
92	William A. Ashbrook	D	OH-17	March 4, 1907	Chairman: Coinage, Weights and Measures
93	William J. Cary	R	WI-4	March 4, 1907	
94	William E. Cox	D	IN-3	March 4, 1907	
95	Charles G. Edwards	D	GA-1	March 4, 1907	Last term while in the House until 69th Congress.
96	George W. Fairchild	R	NY-34	March 4, 1907	
97	Martin D. Foster	D	IL-23	March 4, 1907	Chairman: Mines and Mining
98	Hannibal L. Godwin	D	NC-6	March 4, 1907	Chairman: Reform in the Civil Service
99	James A. Hamill	D	NJ-12	March 4, 1907	Chairman: Elections No. 2
100	Rufus Hardy	D	TX-6	March 4, 1907	Chairman: Expenditures in the Navy Department
101	Willis C. Hawley	R	OR-1	March 4, 1907	
102	Harvey Helm	D	KY-8	March 4, 1907	Chairman: Census
103	Cordell Hull	D	TN-4	March 4, 1907	
104	Ben Johnson	D	KY-4	March 4, 1907	Chairman: District of Columbia
105	Charles A. Kennedy	R	IA-1	March 4, 1907	
106	John W. Langley	R	KY-10	March 4, 1907	
107	Charles A. Lindbergh	R	MN-6	March 4, 1907	Last term while serving in the House.
108	James C. McLaughlin	R	MI-9	March 4, 1907	
109	George W. Rauch	D	IN-11	March 4, 1907	Last term while serving in the House.
110	Adolph J. Sabath	D	IL-5	March 4, 1907	Chairman: Alcohol Liquor Traffic
111	James T. McDermott	D	IL-4	March 4, 1915	Previously served 1907-July 21, 1914, while in the House. Last term while serving in the House.
112	Daniel R. Anthony, Jr.	R	KS-1	May 23, 1907	
113	Charles C. Carlin	D	VA-8	November 5, 1907	
114	Charles D. Carter	D	OK-3	November 16, 1907	
115	Scott Ferris	D	OK-6	November 16, 1907	Chairman: Public Lands
116	C. Bascom Slemp	R	VA-9	December 17, 1907	
117	Henry A. Barnhart	D	IN-13	November 3, 1908	
118	Albert Estopinal	D	LA-1	November 3, 1908	
119	Frank E. Guernsey	R	ME-4	November 3, 1908	Last term while serving in the House.
Five non-consecutive terms
120	William B. McKinley	R	IL-19	March 4, 1915	Previously served 1905-13 while in the House.
Four consecutive terms
121	Richard W. Austin	R	TN-2	March 4, 1909	
122	William P. Borland	D	MO-5	March 4, 1909	
123	Joseph W. Byrns	D	TN-6	March 4, 1909	
124	J. Campbell Cantrill	D	KY-7	March 4, 1909	Chairman: Industrial Arts and Expositions
125	Cyrus Cline	D	IN-12	March 4, 1909	Last term while serving in the House.
126	James W. Collier	D	MS-8	March 4, 1909	
127	Michael F. Conry	D	NY-15	March 4, 1909	Died on March 2, 1917, while still serving in the House.
128	William A. Cullop	D	IN-2	March 4, 1909	Last term while serving in the House.
129	S. Hubert Dent, Jr.	D	AL-2	March 4, 1909	
130	Martin Dies	D	TX-2	March 4, 1909	Chairman: Railways and Canals
131	Daniel A. Driscoll	D	NY-42	March 4, 1909	Last term while serving in the House.
132	Thomas Gallagher	D	IL-8	March 4, 1909	
133	James W. Good	R	IA-5	March 4, 1909	
134	William W. Griest	R	PA-9	March 4, 1909	
135	Dudley M. Hughes	D	GA-12	March 4, 1909	Chairman: Education. Last term while serving in the House.
136	Irvine L. Lenroot	R	WI-11	March 4, 1909	
137	Clarence B. Miller	R	MN-8	March 4, 1909	
138	Dick T. Morgan	R	OK-8	March 4, 1909	
139	Martin A. Morrison	D	IN-9	March 4, 1909	Chairman: Patents. Last term while serving in the House.
140	Ralph W. Moss	D	IN-5	March 4, 1909	Last term while serving in the House.
141	William A. Oldfield	D	AR-2	March 4, 1909	
142	Thomas U. Sisson	D	MS-4	March 4, 1909	
143	Edward T. Taylor	D	CO-4	March 4, 1909	
144	Robert Y. Thomas, Jr.	D	KY-3	March 4, 1909	
145	Frank P. Woods	R	IA-10	March 4, 1909	
146	Clement C. Dickinson	D	MO-6	February 1, 1910	
147	H. Garland Dupré	D	LA-2	November 8, 1910	
Four non-consecutive terms
148	Benjamin K. Focht	R	PA-17	March 4, 1915	Previously served 1907-13 while in the House.
149	James McAndrews	D	IL-6	March 4, 1913	Previously served 1901-05 while in the House.
150	Joseph J. Russell	D	MO-14	March 4, 1911	Previously served 1907-09 while in the House.
151	James S. Davenport	D	OK-1	March 4, 1911	Previously served November 16, 1907-09 while in the House. Last term while serving in the House.
Three consecutive terms
152	Alfred G. Allen	D	OH-2	March 4, 1911	Last term while serving in the House.
153	Sydney Anderson	R	MN-1	March 4, 1911	
154	Fred L. Blackmon	D	AL-4	March 4, 1911	
155	William G. Brown, Jr.	D	WV-2	March 4, 1911	Died on March 9, 1916, while still serving in the House.
156	Frank Buchanan	D	IL-7	March 4, 1911	Last term while serving in the House.
157	Michael E. Burke	D	WI-2	March 4, 1911	Last term while serving in the House.
158	James F. Byrnes	D	SC-2	March 4, 1911	
159	Oscar Callaway	D	TX-12	March 4, 1911	Last term while serving in the House.
160	Ira C. Copley	Prog	IL-11	March 4, 1911	Republican 1911-15
161	Henry G. Danforth	R	NY-39	March 4, 1911	Last term while serving in the House.
162	Frank E. Doremus	D	MI-1	March 4, 1911	
163	Robert L. Doughton	D	NC-8	March 4, 1911	Chairman: Expenditures in the Agriculture Department
164	John R. Farr	R	PA-10	March 4, 1911	
165	William J. Fields	D	KY-9	March 4, 1911	
166	William S. Goodwin	D	AR-7	March 4, 1911	
167	Finly H. Gray	D	IN-6	March 4, 1911	Last term while serving in the House until 73rd Congress
168	Pat Harrison	D	MS-6	March 4, 1911	
169	Henry T. Helgesen	R	ND-1	March 4, 1911	
170	Walter L. Hensley	D	MO-13	March 4, 1911	
171	Asher C. Hinds	R	ME-1	March 4, 1911	Last term while serving in the House.
172	Edward E. Holland	D	VA-2	March 4, 1911	
173	William S. Howard	D	GA-5	March 4, 1911	
174	Henderson M. Jacoway	D	AR-5	March 4, 1911	
175	William Kent	Ind	CA-1	March 4, 1911	Last term while serving in the House.
176	Thomas F. Konop	D	WI-9	March 4, 1911	Chairman: Expenditures on Public Buildings. Last term while serving in the House.
177	William L. La Follette	R	WA-4	March 4, 1911	
178	David J. Lewis	D	MD-6	March 4, 1911	Chairman: Labor. Last term while serving in the House until 72nd Congress
179	J. Charles Linthicum	D	MD-4	March 4, 1911	
180	Charles O. Lobeck	D	NE-2	March 4, 1911	Chairman: Expenditures in the Treasury Department
181	James P. Maher	D	NY-5	March 4, 1911	Chairman: Expenditures in the Labor Department
182	Daniel J. McGillicuddy	D	ME-2	March 4, 1911	Last term while serving in the House.
183	John C. McKenzie	R	IL-13	March 4, 1911	
184	Luther W. Mott	R	NY-32	March 4, 1911	
185	George F. O'Shaunessy	D	RI-1	March 4, 1911	
186	Thomas G. Patten	D	NY-18	March 4, 1911	Last term while serving in the House.
187	Stephen G. Porter	R	PA-29	March 4, 1911	
188	Caleb Powers	R	KY-11	March 4, 1911	
189	John E. Raker	D	CA-2	March 4, 1911	
190	Edwin E. Roberts	R	NV-al	March 4, 1911	
191	Arthur B. Rouse	D	KY-6	March 4, 1911	
192	Thomas L. Rubey	D	MO-16	March 4, 1911	
193	Thomas J. Scully	D	NJ-3	March 4, 1911	
194	Sam R. Sells	R	TN-1	March 4, 1911	
195	Charles H. Sloan	R	NE-4	March 4, 1911	
196	Charles B. Smith	D	NY-41	March 4, 1911	Chairman: Expenditures in the Commerce Department
197	John M. C. Smith	R	MI-3	March 4, 1911	
198	Charles M. Stedman	D	NC-5	March 4, 1911	
199	Hubert D. Stephens	D	MS-2	March 4, 1911	Chairman: Elections
200	William Stephens	Prog	CA-10	March 4, 1911	R 1911–15. Resigned on July 22, 1916, while still serving in the House.
201	Claude U. Stone	D	IL-16	March 4, 1911	Last term while serving in the House.
202	Robert M. Switzer	R	OH-10	March 4, 1911	
203	Horace M. Towner	R	IA-8	March 4, 1911	
204	Samuel J. Tribble	D	GA-8	March 4, 1911	Died on December 8, 1916, while still serving in the House.
205	Samuel A. Witherspoon	D	MS-5	March 4, 1911	Died on November 24, 1915, while still serving in the House.
206	James Young	D	TX-3	March 4, 1911	
207	William R. Green	R	IA-9	June 5, 1911	
208	Leonidas C. Dyer	R	MO-12	March 4, 1915	Previously served 1911-June 19, 1914, while in the House.
209	William J. Browning	R	NJ-1	November 7, 1911	
210	Kenneth McKellar	D	TN-10	November 7, 1911	Last term while serving in the House.
211	Dan V. Stephens	D	NE-3	November 7, 1911	
212	Joseph Taggart	D	KS-2	November 7, 1911	Last term while serving in the House.
213	Carl T. Hayden	D	AZ-al	February 19, 1912	
214	William S. Vare	R	PA-1	May 24, 1912	
215	Frank L. Greene	R	VT-1	July 30, 1912	
216	Edwin A. Merritt	R	NY-31	November 5, 1912	Died as Representative-elect December 4, 1914
217	Lewis L. Morgan	D	LA-6	November 5, 1912	Chairman: Elections No. 3. Last term while serving in the House.
218	Samuel M. Taylor	D	AR-6	January 15, 1913	
219	Archibald C. Hart	D	NJ-6	July 22, 1913	Previously served November 5, 1912 – 1913 while in the House. Last term while serving in the House.
Three non-consecutive terms
220	Samuel H. Miller	R	PA-28	March 4, 1915	Previously served 1881-85 while in the House. Last term while serving in the House.
221	John Q. Tilson	R	CT-3	March 4, 1915	Previously served 1909-13 while in the House.
222	William E. Williams	D	IL-al	March 4, 1913	Previously served 1899-1901 while in the House. Last term while serving in the House.
223	Charles R. Crisp	D	GA-3	March 4, 1913	Previously served December 19, 1896–97 while in the House.
Two consecutive terms
224	John W. Abercrombie	D	AL-al	March 4, 1913	Last term while serving in the House.
225	James B. Aswell	D	LA-8	March 4, 1913	
226	Warren W. Bailey	D	PA-19	March 4, 1913	Chairman: Expenditures in the Justice Department. Last term while serving in the House.
227	Alben W. Barkley	D	KY-1	March 4, 1913	
228	Samuel W. Beakes	D	MI-2	March 4, 1913	Last term while in the House until 65th Congress
229	Frederick A. Britten	R	IL-9	March 4, 1913	
230	Edward E. Browne	R	WI-8	March 4, 1913	
231	Henry Bruckner	D	NY-22	March 4, 1913	
232	Clement L. Brumbaugh	D	OH-12	March 4, 1913	
233	Thaddeus H. Caraway	D	AR-1	March 4, 1913	
234	John F. Carew	D	NY-17	March 4, 1913	
235	John J. Casey	D	PA-11	March 4, 1913	Last term while serving in the House until 66th Congress
236	Walter M. Chandler	Prog	NY-19	March 4, 1913	
237	Denver S. Church	D	CA-7	March 4, 1913	
238	John R. Connelly	D	KS-6	March 4, 1913	
239	Louis C. Cramton	R	MI-7	March 4, 1913	
240	Robert Crosser	D	OH-21	March 4, 1913	
241	Charles F. Curry	R	CA-3	March 4, 1913	
242	Harry H. Dale	D	NY-4	March 4, 1913	
243	Perl D. Decker	D	MO-15	March 4, 1913	
244	Charles H. Dillon	R	SD-1	March 4, 1913	
245	Peter J. Dooling	D	NY-16	March 4, 1913	
246	Dudley Doolittle	D	KS-4	March 4, 1913	
247	Thomas B. Dunn	R	NY-38	March 4, 1913	
248	John J. Eagan	D	NJ-11	March 4, 1913	
249	Joe H. Eagle	D	TX-8	March 4, 1913	
250	George W. Edmonds	R	PA-4	March 4, 1913	
251	John M. Evans	D	MT-al	March 4, 1913	
252	Simeon D. Fess	R	OH-7	March 4, 1913	
253	James A. Frear	R	WI-10	March 4, 1913	
254	Warren Gard	D	OH-3	March 4, 1913	
255	William Gordon	D	OH-20	March 4, 1913	
256	George S. Graham	R	PA-2	March 4, 1913	
257	Daniel J. Griffin	D	NY-8	March 4, 1913	
258	Charles M. Hamilton	R	NY-43	March 4, 1913	Minority Whip.
259	Guy T. Helvering	D	KS-5	March 4, 1913	
260	William L. Igoe	D	MO-11	March 4, 1913	
261	Albert Johnson	R	WA-3	March 4, 1913	
262	Edward Keating	D	CO-3	March 4, 1913	
263	Abraham L. Keister	R	PA-22	March 4, 1913	Last term while serving in the House.
264	Patrick H. Kelley	R	MI-6	March 4, 1913	
265	Ambrose Kennedy	R	RI-3	March 4, 1913	
266	William Kettner	D	CA-11	March 4, 1913	
267	John A. Key	D	OH-8	March 4, 1913	Chairman: Pensions
268	Edgar R. Kiess	R	PA-15	March 4, 1913	
269	Aaron S. Kreider	R	PA-18	March 4, 1913	
270	Ladislas Lazaro	D	LA-7	March 4, 1913	
271	John V. Lesher	D	PA-16	March 4, 1913	
272	Charles Lieb	D	IN-1	March 4, 1913	Last term while serving in the House.
273	Carl E. Mapes	R	MI-5	March 4, 1913	
274	Andrew J. Montague	D	VA-3	March 4, 1913	
275	John M. Morin	R	PA-31	March 4, 1913	
276	Hunter H. Moss, Jr.	R	WV-4	March 4, 1913	Died on July 15, 1916, while still serving in the House
277	William H. Murray	D	OK-4	March 4, 1913	Last term while serving in the House.
278	John I. Nolan	R	CA-5	March 4, 1913	
279	Patrick D. Norton	R	ND-3	March 4, 1913	
280	Woodson R. Oglesby	D	NY-24	March 4, 1913	Last term while serving in the House.
281	James S. Parker	R	NY-29	March 4, 1913	
282	Michael F. Phelan	D	MA-7	March 4, 1913	
283	Edmund Platt	R	NY-26	March 4, 1913	
284	Percy E. Quin	D	MS-7	March 4, 1913	
285	J. Willard Ragsdale	D	SC-6	March 4, 1913	
286	Sam Rayburn	D	TX-4	March 4, 1913	
287	Michael K. Reilly	D	WI-6	March 4, 1913	Last term while serving in the House. until 71st Congress
288	John J. Rogers	R	MA-5	March 4, 1913	
289	Nicholas J. Sinnott	R	OR-2	March 4, 1913	
290	Addison T. Smith	R	ID-al	March 4, 1913	
291	George R. Smith	R	MN-5	March 4, 1913	Last term while serving in the House.
292	Tom Stout	D	MT-al	March 4, 1913	Chairman: Expenditures in the Interior Department. Last term while serving in the House.
293	Hatton W. Sumners	D	TX-5	March 4, 1913	
294	Howard Sutherland	R	WV-al	March 4, 1913	Last term while serving in the House.
295	Clyde H. Tavenner	D	Il-14	March 4, 1913	Chairman: Expenditures in the Post Office Department. Last term while serving in the House.
296	Joseph B. Thompson	D	OK-5	March 4, 1913	
297	Allen T. Treadway	R	MA-1	March 4, 1913	
298	John R. Walker	D	GA-11	March 4, 1913	
299	Walter A. Watson	D	VA-4	March 4, 1913	
300	Emmett Wilson	D	FL-3	March 4, 1913	Last term while serving in the House.
301	Otis T. Wingo	D	AR-4	March 4, 1913	
302	Samuel E. Winslow	R	MA-4	March 4, 1913	
303	George M. Young	R	ND-2	March 4, 1913	
304	James P. Buchanan	D	TX-10	April 15, 1913	
305	Richard S. Whaley	D	SC-1	April 29, 1913	
306	John A. Peters	R	ME-3	September 9, 1913	
307	Matthew M. Neely	D	WV-1	October 14, 1913	
308	Charles P. Coady	D	MD-3	November 4, 1913	
309	George W. Loft	D	NY-13	November 4, 1913	Last term while serving in the House.
310	Calvin D. Paige	R	MA-3	November 4, 1913	
311	Frank Park	D	GA-2	November 4, 1913	
312	Dow H. Drukker	R	NJ-7	April 7, 1914	
313	James A. Gallivan	D	MA-12	April 7, 1914	
314	Jesse D. Price	D	MD-1	November 3, 1914	
315	Carl Vinson	D	GA-10	November 3, 1914	
Two non-consecutive terms
316	Thomas S. Crago	R	PA-al	March 4, 1915	Previously served 1911-13 while in the House.
317	David Hollingsworth	R	OH-18	March 4, 1915	Previously served 1909-11 while in the House.
318	Adam B. Littlepage	D	WV-3	March 4, 1915	Previously served 1911-13 while in the House.
319	Ashton C. Shallenberger	D	NE-5	March 4, 1915	Previously served 1901-03 while in the House.
One term
320	Edward B. Almon	D	AL-8	March 4, 1915	
321	William A. Ayres	D	KS-8	March 4, 1915	
322	Isaac Bacharach	R	NJ-2	March 4, 1915	
323	C. William Beales	R	PA-20	March 4, 1915	Only term while serving in the House.
324	Eugene Black	D	TX-1	March 4, 1915	
325	James J. Britt	R	NC-10	March 4, 1915	Only term while serving in the House until 65th Congress
326	William M. Brown	R	PA-24	March 4, 1915	Died as Representative-elect on January 31, 1915
327	C. Pope Caldwell	D	NY-2	March 4, 1915	
328	John H. Capstick	R	NJ-5	March 4, 1915	
329	William H. Carter	R	MA-13	March 4, 1915	
330	William B. Charles	R	NY-30	March 4, 1915	Only term while serving in the House.
331	Burnett M. Chiperfield	R	IL-al	March 4, 1915	Only term while serving in the House. until 71st Congress
332	William H. Coleman	R	PA-30	March 4, 1915	Only term while serving in the House.
333	Edward Cooper	R	WV-5	March 4, 1915	
334	John G. Cooper	R	OH-19	March 4, 1915	
335	Peter E. Costello	R	PA-5	March 4, 1915	
336	Porter H. Dale	R	VT-2	March 4, 1915	
337	Frederick W. Dallinger	R	MA-8	March 4, 1915	
338	George P. Darrow	R	PA-6	March 4, 1915	
339	James H. Davis	D	TX-al	March 4, 1915	Only term while serving in the House.
340	S. Wallace Dempsey	R	NY-40	March 4, 1915	
341	Edward E. Denison	R	IL-25	March 4, 1915	
342	Arthur G. Dewalt	D	PA-13	March 4, 1915	
343	Clarence C. Dill	D	WA-5	March 4, 1915	
344	Cassius C. Dowell	R	IA-7	March 4, 1915	
345	Franklin Ellsworth	R	MN-2	March 4, 1915	
346	John A. Elston	Prog	CA-6	March 4, 1915	
347	Henry I. Emerson	R	OH-22	March 4, 1915	
348	Michael F. Farley	D	NY-14	March 4, 1915	Only term while serving in the House.
349	Joseph V. Flynn	D	NY-3	March 4, 1915	
350	Richard P. Freeman	R	CT-2	March 4, 1915	
351	Harry L. Gandy	D	SD-3	March 4, 1915	
352	Mahlon M. Garland	R	PA-al	March 4, 1915	
353	James P. Glynn	R	CT-5	March 4, 1915	
354	Edward W. Gray	R	NJ-8	March 4, 1915	
355	Oscar L. Gray	D	AL-1	March 4, 1915	
356	Lindley H. Hadley	R	WA-2	March 4, 1915	
357	Reuben L. Haskell	R	NY-10	March 4, 1915	
358	William W. Hastings	D	OK-2	March 4, 1915	
359	Robert D. Heaton	R	PA-12	March 4, 1915	
360	Benigno C. Hernández	R	NM-al	March 4, 1915	Only term while serving in the House until 66th Congress.
361	Frederick C. Hicks	R	NY-1	March 4, 1915	
362	Benjamin Hilliard	D	CO-1	March 4, 1915	
363	George E. Hood	D	NC-3	March 4, 1915	
364	Robert F. Hopwood	R	PA-23	March 4, 1915	Only term while serving in the House.
365	George Huddleston	D	AL-9	March 4, 1915	
366	G. Murray Hulbert	D	NY-21	March 4, 1915	
367	Harry E. Hull	R	IA-2	March 4, 1915	
368	James W. Husted	R	NY-25	March 4, 1915	
369	Elijah C. Hutchinson	R	NJ-4	March 4, 1915	
370	W. Frank James	R	MI-12	March 4, 1915	
371	Royal C. Johnson	R	SD-2	March 4, 1915	
372	Charles C. Kearns	R	OH-6	March 4, 1915	
373	David H. Kincheloe	D	KY-2	March 4, 1915	
374	Edward J. King	R	IL-15	March 4, 1915	
375	Frederick R. Lehlbach	R	NJ-10	March 4, 1915	
376	Michael Liebel, Jr.	D	PA-25	March 4, 1915	Only term while serving in the House.
377	Meyer London	Soc	NY-12	March 4, 1915	
378	Walter W. Magee	R	NY-35	March 4, 1915	
379	Whitmell P. Martin	Prog	LA-3	March 4, 1915	
380	Nelson E. Matthews	R	OH-5	March 4, 1915	Only term while serving in the House.
381	James H. Mays	D	UT-2	March 4, 1915	
382	Clifton N. McArthur	R	OR-3	March 4, 1915	
383	James V. McClintic	D	OK-7	March 4, 1915	
384	Robert M. McCracken	R	ID-al	March 4, 1915	Only term while serving in the House.
385	Roscoe C. McCulloch	R	OH-16	March 4, 1915	
386	Louis T. McFadden	R	PA-14	March 4, 1915	
387	A. Jeff McLemore	D	TX-al	March 4, 1915	
388	Jacob E. Meeker	R	MO-10	March 4, 1915	
389	Thomas W. Miller	R	DE-al	March 4, 1915	Only term while serving in the House.
390	William C. Mooney	R	OH-15	March 4, 1915	Only term while serving in the House.
391	Merrill Moores	R	IN-7	March 4, 1915	
392	Sydney E. Mudd II	R	MD-5	March 4, 1915	
393	Charles A. Nichols	R	MI-13	March 4, 1915	
394	Solomon T. North	R	PA-27	March 4, 1915	Only term while serving in the House.
395	P. Davis Oakey	R	CT-1	March 4, 1915	Only term while serving in the House.
396	William B. Oliver	D	AL-6	March 4, 1915	
397	Richard Olney II	D	MA-14	March 4, 1915	
398	Arthur W. Overmyer	D	OH-13	March 4, 1915	
399	Harry H. Pratt	R	NY-37	March 4, 1915	
400	C. William Ramseyer	R	IA-6	March 4, 1915	
401	Charles H. Randall	Proh	CA-9	March 4, 1915	
402	C. Frank Reavis	R	NE-1	March 4, 1915	
403	Edwin D. Ricketts	R	OH-11	March 4, 1915	Only term while serving in the House until 66th Congress.
404	Frederick W. Rowe	R	NY-6	March 4, 1915	
405	Charles H. Rowland	R	PA-21	March 4, 1915	
406	J. Edward Russell	R	OH-4	March 4, 1915	Only term while serving in the House.
407	Rollin B. Sanford	R	NY-28	March 4, 1915	
408	Thomas D. Schall	R	MN-10	March 4, 1915	
409	Frank D. Scott	R	MI-11	March 4, 1915	
410	John R. K. Scott	R	PA-al	March 4, 1915	
411	William J. Sears	D	FL-4	March 4, 1915	
412	Jouett Shouse	D	KS-7	March 4, 1915	
413	Isaac Siegel	R	NY-20	March 4, 1915	
414	Homer P. Snyder	R	NY-33	March 4, 1915	
415	Henry B. Steagall	D	AL-3	March 4, 1915	
416	Henry J. Steele	D	PA-26	March 4, 1915	
417	Thomas J. Steele	D	IA-11	March 4, 1915	Only term while serving in the House.
418	Walter R. Stiness	R	RI-2	March 4, 1915	
419	Burton E. Sweet	R	IA-3	March 4, 1915	
420	Oscar W. Swift	R	NY-9	March 4, 1915	
421	Peter F. Tague	D	MA-10	March 4, 1915	
422	John N. Tillman	D	AR-3	March 4, 1915	
423	Charles B. Timberlake	R	CO-2	March 4, 1915	
424	George H. Tinkham	R	MA-11	March 4, 1915	
425	Carl Van Dyke	D	MN-4	March 4, 1915	
426	Joseph Walsh	R	MA-16	March 4, 1915	
427	Charles B. Ward	R	NY-27	March 4, 1915	
428	Edward H. Wason	R	NH-2	March 4, 1915	
429	Henry W. Watson	R	PA-8	March 4, 1915	
430	Loren E. Wheeler	R	IL-21	March 4, 1915	
431	Seward H. Williams	R	OH-14	March 4, 1915	Only term while serving in the House.
432	Thomas S. Williams	R	IL-24	March 4, 1915	
433	Riley J. Wilson	D	LA-5	March 4, 1915	
434	James W. Wise	D	GA-6	March 4, 1915	
435	William R. Wood	R	IN-10	March 4, 1915	
Members joining the House, after the start of the Congress
	Samuel J. Nicholls	D	SC-4	September 14, 1915	Special election
	William S. Bennet	R	NY-23	November 2, 1915	Previously served 1905-11 while in the House. Special election. Last term.
	Henry W. Temple	R	PA-24	November 2, 1915	Previously served as Prog 1913-15 while in the House. Special election.
	Norman J. Gould	R	NY-36	November 2, 1915	Special election
	Bertrand H. Snell	R	NY-31	November 2, 1915	Special election
	William W. Venable	D	MS-5	January 4, 1916	Special election
	George M. Bowers	R	WV-2	May 9, 1916	Special election
	Harry C. Woodyard	R	WV-4	November 7, 1916	Previously served 1903-11 while in the House. Special election.
	Henry S. Benedict	R	CA-10	November 7, 1916	Special election. Only term while serving in the House.
	Thomas W. Harrison	D	VA-7	November 7, 1916	Special election
	Tinsley W. Rucker, Jr.	D	GA-8	January 11, 1917	Special election. Only term while serving in the House.
	Paul G. McCorkle	D	SC-5	February 21, 1917	Special election. Only term while serving in the House.
Non voting members
a	Jonah K. Kalaniana'ole	R	HI-al	March 4, 1903	Territorial Delegate
b	James Wickersham	R	AK-al	March 4, 1909	Territorial Delegate. Last term while serving in the House until 65th Congress.
c	Manuel L. Quezón	N	PI-al	November 23, 1909	Resident Commissioner. Nationalist Party (PI). Resigned on October 15, 1916, while still serving in the House.
d	Luis Muñoz Rivera	U	PR-al	March 4, 1911	Resident Commissioner. Unionist Party (PR). Died on November 15, 1916, while still serving in the House.
e	Manuel Earnshaw	Ind	PI-al	March 4, 1913	Resident Commissioner. Last term while serving in the House.

== See also ==
- 64th United States Congress
- List of United States congressional districts
- List of United States senators in the 64th Congress
