= Andrew Maguire (whistleblower) =

British commodities trader and whistleblower

Andrew Maguire is a British commodities trader and whistleblower. He presented evidence to United States regulators alleging that fraud had been committed, and that prices in the international gold and silver markets had been manipulated. No regulatory or legal action has been taken as a result of his accusations.

== Background ==
On 29 March 2010 he was interviewed on the radio with Gold Anti-Trust Action Committee (GATA) board member Adrian Douglas. He went public in April 2010 with assertions of market manipulation by JPMorgan Chase and HSBC of the gold and silver markets, prompting a number of lawsuits, including a class action lawsuit. Maguire was not a former Goldman Sachs trader as has often been reported, although he did work briefly for J. Aron & Co. which was acquired by Goldman Sachs in 1981.

== Market manipulation ==
In a CBC interview aired in April 2013, Andrew Maguire described how mysterious traders, allegedly working for bullion banks JPMorgan and to a lesser extent HSBC, waited for most of the major markets from Shanghai to London to be closed then concentrated their dealing on COMEX. He said that traders were trading virtual or electronic silver anonymously using algorithmic trading systems "moving in and out of the futures markets in the blink of an eye." Maguire described a sudden and massive wave of sales driving the price of silver down. Other investors sold in an attempt to mitigate losses. Then, the seller started buying silver again. 45,000 contracts with a profit of $80,000 per contract totaled $3,600,000,000 for the mystery seller.

According to Maguire, the precious metals markets trade "pretty much in tandem", but because the silver market is so much smaller, it is harder to disguise one's activities and therefore easier to figure out who is behind a manipulative event. After Bear Stearns and their short silver positions were acquired by JPMorgan, manipulative events in the silver market became more frequent. Maguire decided to inform the CFTC. He contacted commissioner Bart Chilton, who had Eliud Ramirez, a senior investigator from the CFTC's enforcement division, get in touch with Maguire. Maguire explained the manipulations in great detail, both over the phone in an hour-long interview and afterward, in a series of e-mails with screen shots.

Maguire then predicted a manipulative event in the silver market and gave detailed information in an e-mail to the CFTC about what to expect, sending it on 3 February 2010, two days prior to the event. The event transpired exactly as Maguire predicted. While the event was taking place, Maguire sent e-mails in real time, pointing out certain details because the CFTC enforcement seemed not to know what to look for or how to interpret the data.

GATA chairman Bill Murphy gave a detailed account of Maguire's allegations to the Commodity Futures Trading Commission (CFTC), stating how "JP Morgan Chase signals to the market its intention to take down the precious metals. Traders recognize these signals and make money shorting the metals alongside JPMorgan. [He] explained how there are routine market manipulations at the time of option expiry, non-farm payroll data releases, and COMEX contract rollover, as well as the ad hoc events."

== Ongoing criminal investigation ==
The United States Department of Justice's Antitrust Division and the CFTC are conducting civil and criminal probes. The CFTC has interviewed 32 people and reviewed 40,000 documents, but as of May 2011, no action has been taken. On 24 February 2011, in less than an hour, the price of silver fell $1.50 per ounce before recovering. Another London-based trader, Richard Guthrie, wrote to Chilton to complain about the event, asking "How many investors lost money and positions to the financial benefit of an elite few?" Chilton believes violations of the law have taken place and wants to see prosecutions move forward, but the five-member commission has yet to act.

== See also ==
- Gold as an investment
- Regulatory capture
- Silver as an investment
- Inside Job – Academy Award-winning documentary about "the systemic corruption of the United States by the financial services industry and the consequences of that systemic corruption"
- List of whistleblowers
