= Shilton =

Shilton may refer to:

== Places ==
- Shilton, Oxfordshire, England
- Shilton, Warwickshire, England
  - Shilton railway station, a former station

== Other ==
- Shilton (surname)
- Earl Shilton, a town in Leicestershire, England
- Chilton (disambiguation)
- Shelton (disambiguation)
