= List of United States senators in the 64th Congress =

This is a complete list of United States senators during the 64th United States Congress listed by seniority from March 4, 1915, to March 3, 1917.

Order of service is based on the commencement of the senator's first term. Behind this is former service as a senator (only giving the senator seniority within their new incoming class), service as vice president, a House member, a cabinet secretary, or a governor of a state. The final factor is the population of the senator's state.

Senators who were sworn in during the middle of the Congress (up until the last senator who was not sworn in early after winning the November 1916 election) are listed at the end of the list with no number.

== Terms of service ==
| Class | Terms of service of senators that expired in years |
|---|---|
| Class 1 | Terms of service of senators that expired in 1917 (AZ, CA, CT, DE, FL, IN, MA, MD, ME, MI, MN, MO, MS, MT, ND, NE, NJ, NM, NV, NY, OH, PA, RI, TN, TX, UT, VA, VT, WA, WI, WV, and WY.) |
| Class 2 | Terms of service of senators that expired in 1919 (AL, AR, CO, DE, GA, IA, ID, IL, KS, KY, LA, MA, ME, MI, MN, MS, MT, NC, NE, NH, NJ, NM, OK, OR, RI, SC, SD, TN, TX, VA, WV, and WY.) |
| Class 3 | Terms of service of senators that expired in 1921 (AL, AR, AZ, CA, CO, CT, FL, GA, ID, IL, IN, IA, KS, KY, LA, MD, MO, NC, ND, NH, NV, NY, OH, OK, OR, PA, SC, SD, UT, VT, WA, and WI.) |

== U.S. Senate seniority list ==
U.S. Senate seniority
| Rank | Senator (party-state) | Seniority date | Other factors |
|---|---|---|---|
| 1 | Jacob H. Gallinger (R-NH) | March 4, 1891 | |
| 2 | Henry Cabot Lodge (R-MA) | March 4, 1893 | |
| 3 | Clarence D. Clark (R-WY) | January 23, 1895 | |
| 4 | Francis E. Warren (R-WY) | March 4, 1895 | Previously a senator |
| 5 | Knute Nelson (R-MN) | March 4, 1895 | Former governor, Minnesota 20th in population (1890) |
| 6 | Benjamin Tillman (D-SC) | March 4, 1895 | Former governor, South Carolina 23rd in population (1890) |
| 7 | Thomas S. Martin (D-VA) | March 4, 1895 | |
| 8 | Boies Penrose (R-PA) | March 4, 1897 | |
| 9 | Charles A. Culberson (D-TX) | March 4, 1899 | Former governor |
| 10 | Porter McCumber (R-ND) | March 4, 1899 | |
| 11 | William P. Dillingham (R-VT) | October 18, 1900 | |
| 12 | Moses Clapp (R-MN) | January 23, 1901 | |
| 13 | Furnifold M. Simmons (D-NC) | March 4, 1901 | |
| 14 | Francis Newlands (D-NV) | March 4, 1903 | Former representative |
| 15 | William J. Stone (D-MO) | March 4, 1903 | Former governor, Missouri 5th in population (1900) |
| 16 | James P. Clarke (D-AR) | March 4, 1903 | Former governor, Arkansas 25th in population (1900) |
| 17 | Lee S. Overman (D-NC) | March 4, 1903 | North Carolina 15th in population (1900) |
| 18 | Reed Smoot (R-UT) | March 4, 1903 | Utah 41st in population (1900) |
| 19 | George Sutherland (R-UT) | March 4, 1905 | |
| 20 | Frank B. Brandegee (R-CT) | May 10, 1905 | |
| 21 | Robert M. La Follette, Sr. (R-WI) | January 4, 1906 | |
| 22 | Henry du Pont (R-DE) | June 13, 1906 | |
| 23 | William A. Smith (R-MI) | February 9, 1907 | |
| 24 | William Borah (R-ID) | March 4, 1907 | |
| 25 | John H. Bankhead (D-AL) | June 18, 1907 | |
| 26 | Thomas Gore (D-OK) | December 11, 1907 | "G" 7th in alphabet |
| 27 | Robert Owen (D-OK) | December 11, 1907 | "O" 15th in alphabet |
| 28 | John Walter Smith (D-MD) | March 25, 1908 | |
| 29 | Carroll S. Page (R-VT) | October 21, 1908 | |
| 30 | Albert B. Cummins (R-IA) | November 24, 1908 | |
| 31 | Wesley Jones (R-WA) | March 4, 1909 | Former representative (10 years) |
| 32 | Benjamin Shively (D-IN) | March 4, 1909 | Former representative (7 years) |
| 33 | Ellison D. Smith (D-SC) | March 4, 1909 | South Carolina 24th in population (1900) |
| 34 | Duncan U. Fletcher (D-FL) | March 4, 1909 | Florida 33rd in population (1900) |
| 35 | George Chamberlain (D-OR) | March 4, 1909 | Oregon 36th in population (1900) |
| 36 | George T. Oliver (R-PA) | March 17, 1909 | |
| 37 | Claude A. Swanson (D-VA) | August 1, 1910 | |
| 38 | Asle Gronna (R-ND) | February 2, 1911 | |
| 39 | John S. Williams (D-MS) | March 4, 1911 | Former representative (16 years) |
| 40 | Charles Townsend (R-MI) | March 4, 1911 | Former representative (8 years) |
| 41 | Gilbert Hitchcock (D-NE) | March 4, 1911 | Former representative (6 years) |
| 42 | Miles Poindexter (R-WA) | March 4, 1911 | Former representative (2 years) |
| 43 | George P. McLean (R-CT) | March 4, 1911 | Former governor |
| 44 | Atlee Pomerene (D-OH) | March 4, 1911 | Ohio 4th in population (1910) |
| 45 | James A. Reed (D-MO) | March 4, 1911 | Missouri 7th in population (1910) |
| 46 | John W. Kern (D-IN) | March 4, 1911 | Indiana 9th in population (1910) |
| 47 | James E. Martine (D-NJ) | March 4, 1911 | New Jersey 11th in population (1910) |
| 48 | John D. Works (R-CA) | March 4, 1911 | California 12th in population (1910) |
| 49 | Luke Lea (D-TN) | March 4, 1911 | Tennessee 17th in population (1910) |
| 50 | William E. Chilton (D-WV) | March 4, 1911 | West Virginia 28th in population (1910) |
| 51 | Nathan Bryan (D-FL) | March 4, 1911 | Florida 33rd in population (1910) |
| 52 | Charles F. Johnson (D-ME) | March 4, 1911 | Maine 34th in population (1910) |
| 53 | Henry F. Lippitt (R-RI) | March 4, 1911 | Rhode Island 38th in population (1910) |
| 54 | Henry L. Myers (D-MT) | March 4, 1911 | Montana 40th in population (1910) |
| 55 | James O'Gorman (D-NY) | April 4, 1911 | |
| 56 | William S. Kenyon (R-IA) | April 12, 1911 | |
| 57 | Hoke Smith (D-GA) | November 16, 1911 | |
| 58 | Thomas B. Catron (R-NM) | April 2, 1912 | Former delegate, New Mexico 43rd in population (1910) |
| 59 | Marcus A. Smith (D-AZ) | April 2, 1912 | Former delegate, Arizona 45th in population (1910) |
| 60 | Albert B. Fall (R-NM) | April 2, 1912 | New Mexico 43rd in population (1910) |
| 61 | Henry F. Ashurst (D-AZ) | April 2, 1912 | Arizona 45th in population (1910) |
| 62 | Charles Thomas (D-CO) | January 15, 1913 | |
| 63 | James Brady (R-ID) | January 24, 1913 | |
| 64 | Key Pittman (D-NV) | January 29, 1913 | |
| 65 | Morris Sheppard (D-TX) | February 3, 1913 | |
| 66 | Edwin Burleigh (R-ME) | March 4, 1913 | Former representative (14 years), former governor |
| 67 | Joseph E. Ransdell (D-LA) | March 4, 1913 | Former representative (14 years) |
| 68 | Joseph Robinson (R-AR) | March 4, 1913 | Former representative (10 years), former governor |
| 69 | Ollie James (R-KY) | March 4, 1913 | Former representative (10 years), Kentucky 14th in population (1910) |
| 70 | George W. Norris (R-NE) | March 4, 1913 | Former representative (10 years), Nebraska 29th in population (1910) |
| 71 | John F. Shafroth (D-CO) | March 4, 1913 | Former representative (9 years), former governor |
| 72 | William Hughes (D-NJ) | March 4, 1913 | Former representative (9 years) |
| 73 | John W. Weeks (R-MA) | March 4, 1913 | Former representative (8 years) |
| 74 | Nathan Goff, Jr. (R-WV) | March 4, 1913 | Former representative (6 years), former cabinet member |
| 75 | James K. Vardaman (D-MS) | March 4, 1913 | Former governor |
| 76 | John Shields (D-TN) | March 4, 1913 | Tennessee 17th in population (1910) |
| 77 | William H. Thompson (D-KS) | March 4, 1913 | Kansas 22nd in population (1910) |
| 78 | Harry Lane (D-OR) | March 4, 1913 | Oregon 35th in population (1910) |
| 79 | Thomas Sterling (R-SD) | March 4, 1913 | South Dakota 36th in population (1910) |
| 80 | LeBaron Colt (R-RI) | March 4, 1913 | Rhode Island 38th in population (1910) |
| 81 | Thomas J. Walsh (D-MT) | March 4, 1913 | Montana 40th in population (1910) |
| 82 | Willard Saulsbury, Jr. (D-DE) | March 4, 1913 | Delaware 46th in population (1910) |
| 83 | Henry F. Hollis (D-NH) | March 13, 1913 | |
| 84 | J. Hamilton Lewis (D-IL) | March 26, 1913 | |
| 85 | Lawrence Sherman (R-IL) | March 26, 1913 | |
| 86 | Blair Lee (D-MD) | January 29, 1914 | |
| 87 | Thomas W. Hardwick (D-GA) | November 4, 1914 | |
| 88 | Charles Curtis (R-KS) | March 4, 1915 | Previously a senator |
| 89 | Oscar Underwood (D-AL) | March 4, 1915 | Former representative (19 years) |
| 90 | Robert F. Broussard (D-LA) | March 4, 1915 | Former representative (18 years) |
| 91 | John C. W. Beckham (D-KY) | March 4, 1915 | Former governor |
| 92 | James Wadsworth, Jr. (R-NY) | March 4, 1915 | New York 1st in population (1910) |
| 93 | Warren G. Harding (R-OH) | March 4, 1915 | Ohio 4th in population (1910) |
| 94 | James D. Phelan (D-CA) | March 4, 1915 | California 12th in population (1910) |
| 95 | Paul Husting (D-WI) | March 4, 1915 | Wiscontin 13th in population (1910) |
| 96 | Edwin S. Johnson (D-SD) | March 4, 1915 | South Dakota 36th in population (1910) |
| | Thomas Taggart (D-IN) | March 20, 1916 | |
| | Bert Fernald (R-ME) | September 12, 1916 | |
| | James Watson (R-IN) | November 8, 1916 | Former representative |
| | William F. Kirby (D-AR) | November 8, 1916 | |

== See also ==
- 64th United States Congress
- List of United States representatives in the 64th Congress
