= Andrew Maguire =

Andrew Maguire may refer to:

- Andrew Maguire (politician), member of the U.S. House of Representatives from New Jersey
- Andrew Maguire (whistleblower), British commodities trader and whistleblower
- Alpha (Marvel Comics), a Marvel Comics character

== See also ==
- Andrew McGuire, American trauma prevention specialist and campaigner
