= Avon Park Lakes, Florida =

Residential community in Florida, U.S.

Coordinates: 27°37′42″N 81°32′54″W

Avon Park Lakes (APL) is a residential community of about 2,500 people in northwest Highlands County, Florida. It is bounded by Polk County, Florida, on the north and Hardee County, Florida, on the west. On the northeast it is bounded by Lake Adelaide. The development, roughly C-shaped, reaches to the south a block north of State Road 64 and nearly to the northeast of U.S. Route 27. It is bordered along the middle of the "C" by the city limits of Avon Park, Florida. Avon Park Lakes is unincorporated, but has a homeowners association, the Avon Park Lakes Association.

The development almost surrounds Lake Olivia, which is a lake and park, and it surrounds Lake Chilton. Lake Olivia is completely outside the development, while Lake Chilton is included in it. There is a clubhouse on the south side of Lake Olivia, owned by the Avon Park Lakes Association (the development's homeowner association). No commercial developments are in the boundaries of APL. One church, World Harvest & Restoration Ministries, is inside APL. Another, Iglesia Cristo te Ama, has part of its property inside APL, although the church building is just outside the development. Avon Park Lakes Baptist Church is just outside the extreme eastern edge of the development. This Baptist church got its beginnings inside APL, meeting at the clubhouse before moving to its current location. In 2014 Bread for Life Ministries began meeting Sundays in the clubhouse; this church plans to build at a location south of downtown Avon Park. Other churches associated with APL have come and gone.

The subdivision began in 1956 and grew for almost a decade. It began growing at a quick rate in 1973 and only stopped growing a few years after the real estate crash of 2007-8. Then, probably for the first time in its history, came a slight migration away from the area.
