= Bill Murphy (businessman) =

American football player and businessman (born 1946)

No. 31
- Position: Wide receiver

Personal information
- Born: March 26, 1946 (age 80); Montclair, New Jersey, U.S.
- Listed height: 6 ft 1 in (1.85 m)
- Listed weight: 185 lb (84 kg)

Career information
- High school: Glen Ridge High School (Glen Ridge, New Jersey, U.S.)
- College: Cornell
- NFL draft: 1968: undrafted

Career history
- Boston Patriots (1968)

Career NFL statistics
- Games: 6
- Receptions: 18
- Receiving yards: 268
- Stats at Pro Football Reference

Bill Murphy (born March 26, 1946) is an American former professional professional football player who was a wide receiver for one season in 1969 for the Boston Patriots of the American Football League (AFL). He later became a financial commentator and gold bug who serves as the chairman and director of the Gold Antitrust Action Committee. He graduated from Cornell University in 1968.
