= Skin friction drag =

Type of aerodynamic or hydrodynamic drag

Skin friction drag or viscous drag is a type of aerodynamic or hydrodynamic drag, which is resistant force exerted on an object moving in a fluid. Skin friction drag is caused by the viscosity of fluids and develops from laminar to turbulent drag as a fluid moves more rapidly across the surface of an object. Skin friction drag is generally expressed in terms of the Reynolds number, which is the ratio between inertial force and viscous force.

Total drag can be decomposed into a skin friction drag component and a pressure drag component, where pressure drag includes all other sources of drag, including lift-induced drag. In this conceptualisation, lift-induced drag is an artificial abstraction, part of the horizontal component of the aerodynamic reaction force. Alternatively, total drag can be decomposed into a parasitic drag component and a lift-induced drag component, where parasitic drag is all components of drag except lift-induced drag. In this conceptualisation, skin friction drag is a component of parasitic drag.

== Flow and effect on skin friction drag ==
Laminar flow over a body occurs when layers of the fluid move smoothly past each other in parallel lines. In nature, this kind of flow is rare. As the fluid flows over an object, it applies frictional forces to the surface of the object which works to impede forward movement of the object; the result is called skin friction drag. Skin friction drag is often the major component of parasitic drag on objects in a flow.

The flow over a body may begin as laminar. As a fluid flows over a surface shear stresses within the fluid slow additional fluid particles causing the boundary layer to grow in thickness. At some point along the flow direction, the flow becomes unstable and becomes turbulent. Turbulent flow has a fluctuating and irregular pattern of flow which is made obvious by the formation of vortices. Turbulent flow causes higher skin drag than laminar flow. This is usually undesirable, for example in pipes or ducts, or on aircraft wings. However, in some cases, turbulent flow can reduce net drag. For example, the dimples on a golf ball cause turbulence, which increases skin drag, but which also reduces pressure drag. This effect occurs because turbulent flow remains attached to the surface of the ball for longer than laminar flow, and thus delays flow separation. This results in a narrower wake behind the ball, which reduces pressure drag. Overall drag is reduced, which enables the ball to fly farther.

== Skin friction coefficient ==
=== Definition ===
The skin friction coefficient is defined as:

$$c_{f} = \frac{\tau_w}{\frac{1}{2}\rho_\infty v_\infty^2}$$

where:

- $c_{f}$ is the skin friction coefficient.
- ${\rho_\infty}$ is the density of the free stream (far from the body's surface).
- ${v_\infty}$ is the free stream speed, which is the velocity magnitude of the fluid in the free stream.
- ${\tau_w}$ is the skin shear stress on the surface.
- ${\frac{1}{2}\rho_\infty v_\infty^2\equiv q_\infty}$ is the dynamic pressure of the free stream.

The skin friction coefficient is a dimensionless skin shear stress which is nondimensionalized by the dynamic pressure of the free stream. The skin friction coefficient is defined at any point of a surface that is subjected to the free stream. It will vary at different positions. A fundamental fact in aerodynamics states that $({\tau_w})_{laminar} < ({\tau_w})_{turbulent}$. This immediately implies that laminar skin friction drag is smaller than turbulent skin friction drag, for the same inflow.

The skin friction coefficient is a strong function of the Reynolds number Re; as Re increases, c_{f} decreases.

=== Laminar flow ===
==== Blasius solution ====
$$c_{f} = \frac{0.664}{\sqrt{\mathrm{Re}_x}} \$$

where:

- $Re_x = \frac{\rho vx}{\mu}$, which is the Reynolds number.
  - ρ is the density of the fluid (SI units: kg/m^{3})
  - v is the flow speed (m/s)
  - μ is the dynamic viscosity of the fluid (Pa·s or N·s/m^{2} or kg/(m·s))
  - x is a characteristic length (m), in this case the distance from the reference point at which a boundary layer starts to form.

The above relation is derived from the Blasius boundary layer, which assumes constant pressure throughout the boundary layer and a thin boundary layer. The above relation shows that the skin friction coefficient decreases as the Reynolds number ($Re_x$) increases.

=== Transitional flow ===
==== The Computational Preston Tube Method (CPM) ====
CPM, suggested by Nitsche, estimates the skin shear stress of transitional boundary layers by fitting the equation below to a velocity profile of a transitional boundary layer. $K_1$(Karman constant), and ${\tau}_w$(skin shear stress) are determined numerically during the fitting process.

$$u^{+} = \int_0^{Y^+}\frac{2(1+K_3y^+)}{1+[1+4(K_1 y^+)^2(1+K_3y^+)(1-exp(-y^+\sqrt{1+K_3y^+}/K_2))^2]^{0.5}}\,dy^+$$

where:

- $u^{+} = \frac{u}{u_{\tau}},~u_{\tau}=\sqrt{\frac{{\tau}_w}{\rho}},~y^+=\frac{u_{\tau}y}{\nu}$
- $y$ is a distance from the wall.
- $u$ is a speed of a flow at a given $y$.
- $K_1$ is the Karman constant, which is lower than 0.41, the value for turbulent boundary layers, in transitional boundary layers.
- $K_2$ is the Van Driest constant, which is set to 26 in both transitional and turbulent boundary layers.
- $K_3$ is a pressure parameter, which is equal to $\frac{\nu}{\rho}{u_{\tau}}^3\frac{dp}{dx}$ when $p$ is a pressure and $x$ is the coordinate along a surface where a boundary layer forms.

=== Turbulent flow ===
==== Prandtl's one-seventh-power law ====
$$c_{f} = \frac{0.0576}{Re_x^{1/5}}\$$
The above equation, which is derived from Prandtl's one-seventh-power law, provides a reasonable approximation of the drag coefficient of low-Reynolds-number turbulent boundary layers. Compared to laminar flows, the skin friction coefficient of turbulent flows lowers more slowly as the Reynolds number increases.

=== Skin friction drag ===
A total skin friction drag force can be calculated by integrating skin shear stress on the surface of a body.
$$F = \int\limits_{\text{surface}}c_f \frac{\rho v^{2}}{2}dA$$

== Relationship between skin friction and heat transfer ==
In the point of view of engineering, calculating skin friction is useful in estimating not only total frictional drag exerted on an object but also convectional heat transfer rate on its surface. This relationship is well developed in the concept of Reynolds analogy, which links two dimensionless parameters: skin friction coefficient (Cf), which is a dimensionless frictional stress, and Nusselt number (Nu), which indicates the magnitude of convectional heat transfer. Turbine blades, for example, require the analysis of heat transfer in their design process since they are exposed to high temperature gas, which can damage them with heat. Here, engineers calculate skin friction on the surfaces of turbine blades to predict heat transfer to those surfaces.

== Effects of skin friction drag ==
A 1974 NASA study found that for subsonic aircraft, skin friction drag is the largest component of drag, causing about 45% of the total drag. For supersonic and hypersonic aircraft, the figures are 35% and 25% respectively.

A 1992 NATO study found that for a typical civil transport aircraft, skin friction drag accounted for almost 48% of total drag, followed by induced drag at 37%.

== Reducing skin friction drag ==
There are two main techniques for reducing skin friction drag: delaying the boundary layer transition, and modifying the turbulence structures in a turbulent boundary layer.

One method to modify the turbulence structures in a turbulent boundary layer is the use of riblets. Riblets are small grooves in the surface of the aircraft, aligned with the direction of flow. Tests on an Airbus A320 found riblets caused a drag reduction of almost 2%. Another method is the use of large eddy break-up (LEBU) devices. However, some research into LEBU devices has found a slight increase in drag.

== See also ==
- Parasitic drag
- Pressure drag
