= Chiltons, Virginia =

Unincorporated community in Virginia, US

Coordinates: 38°07′44″N 76°48′23″W

Chiltons is an unincorporated community in Westmoreland County, in the U. S. state of Virginia.

Chiltons is located approximately one mile east of Stratford Hall, seat of the famous Lee family. The property for Stratford Hall was not purchased until 1717. Robert E. Lee, born in 1807, was well aware of Chiltons and neighbors named Chilton by an early age. This case had interesting consequences in Richmond, Virginia, when it was the capital of the Confederacy. Chiltons is likewise located approximately one mile south of the Potomac River, to which it is connected by meandering Currioman Creek.

Immigrant John Chilton and his wife Joan – most likely from Maidstone, England – were landed in Lancaster County by January 1666/7. Their first child, also named John, first appears on the tithable lists of Lancaster County in 1688. Sometime in the 1690s, John Chilton II relocated to Westmoreland County. He first appears in court records on 24 November 1697 when, as a planter of Cople Parish, he purchased from one John Champe 280 acres (1.1 km^{2}) in the forest of Nominy. This is the essence of Chiltons, Virginia.

John Chilton II acquired extensive property, which by 1699 included the junction of Currioman Creek with the Potomac. This estate became known as Currioman and its owner as John Chilton of Currioman. He lived in Westmoreland County some 30 years and died in July 1726. His grave marker has been preserved, and reads: "Here / Lyeth in hopes of a / Joyful Resurrection the / Body of Mr. John Chilton / Merchant who departed / this life the 11th day of July / Anno Domini 1726 / about 60 years."

See descendants: Thomas Chilton, William Parish Chilton, Robert H. Chilton, Robert Emmett Bledsoe Baylor, Robert A. Lovett.
