= Chilton High School =

Chilton High School may refer to:

- Chilton High School (Texas) in Chilton, Texas
- Chilton High School (Wisconsin) in Chilton, Wisconsin
- Chilton County High School in Clanton, Alabama
