= Chiltern =

Chiltern can refer to the following places:

In England:

- Chiltern Hills, an area of Outstanding Natural Beauty, known locally as "the Chilterns"
  - Chiltern District, a local government district in Buckinghamshire named after the hills
  - Chiltern Open Air Museum, an open-air museum in the same hills
- Chiltern Hundreds, ancient administrative area lying partially in the Chiltern Hills
  - Crown Steward and Bailiff of the three Chiltern Hundreds of Stoke, Desborough and Burnham, a political appointment
- Chiltern Main Line, a railway line that runs through the Chiltern Hills
  - Chiltern Railways, the company that operates the line
- Chiltern Radio Network, a group of radio stations based in Dunstable
  - Heart Dunstable, one of the stations in that group, previously known as "Chiltern Radio"
- Chiltern Court, building above Baker Street tube station, London
- Chiltern Street, a street in Marylebone, London

In Australia:

- Chiltern, Victoria, a town near Rutherglen
  - Chiltern railway station

== See also ==
- Chilton (disambiguation)
