= Chilton Independent School District =

School district in Texas

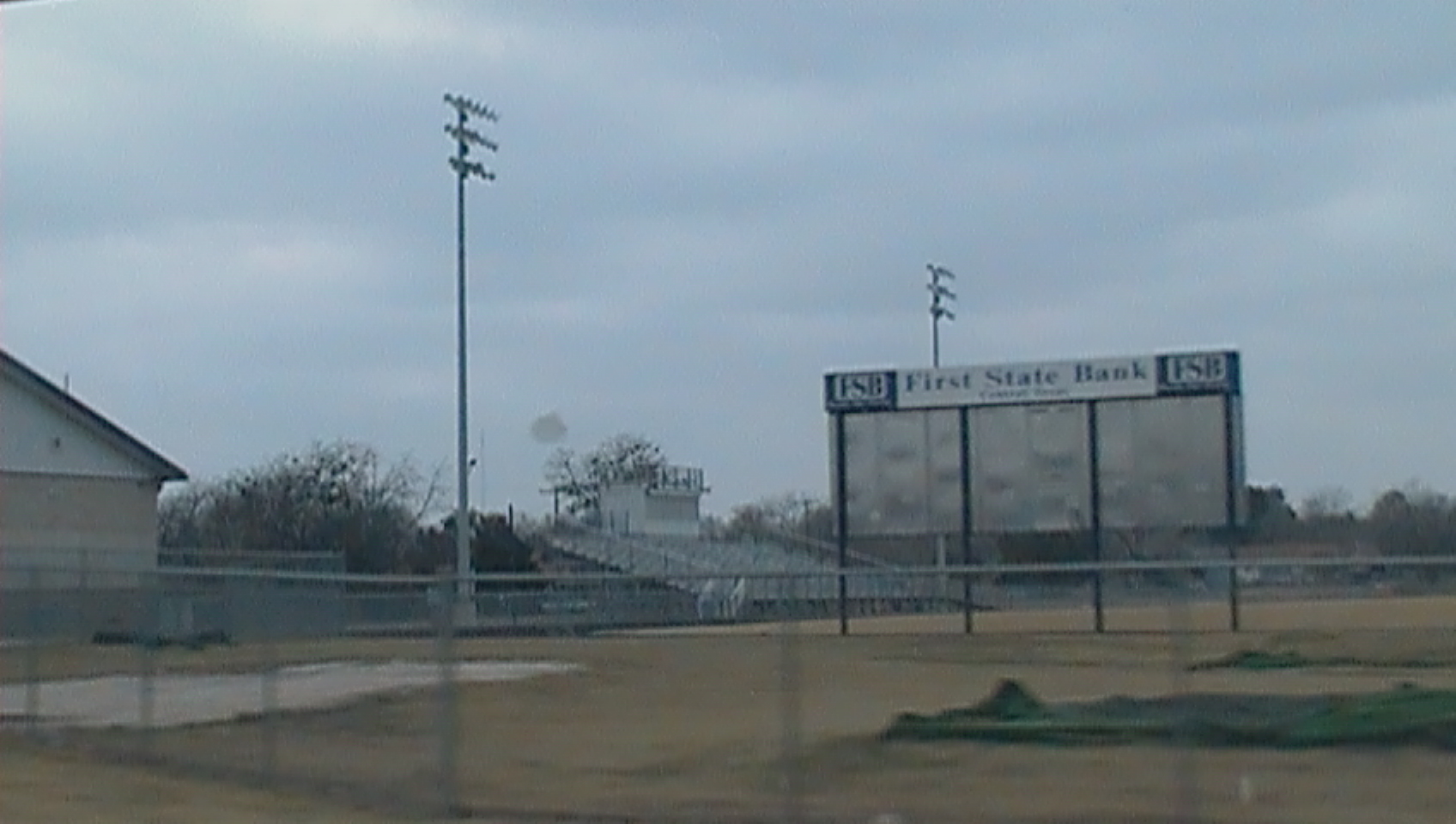
Pirate Field is home to the Chilton football team.

Chilton Independent School District is a public school district based in the community of Chilton, Texas (USA).

In addition to Chilton, the district serves a portion of Golinda.

Chilton ISD has one school that serves students in grades pre-kindergarten through 12.

Chilton Independent School District, more commonly referred to as Chilton High School, prides itself on its successes in various regions of extra-curricular activities, most notably football, in which Chilton won its second 1A state football championship in 2006.

In 2009, the school district was rated "recognized" by the Texas Education Agency.
