= Bart Chilton =

American civil servant (1960–2019)

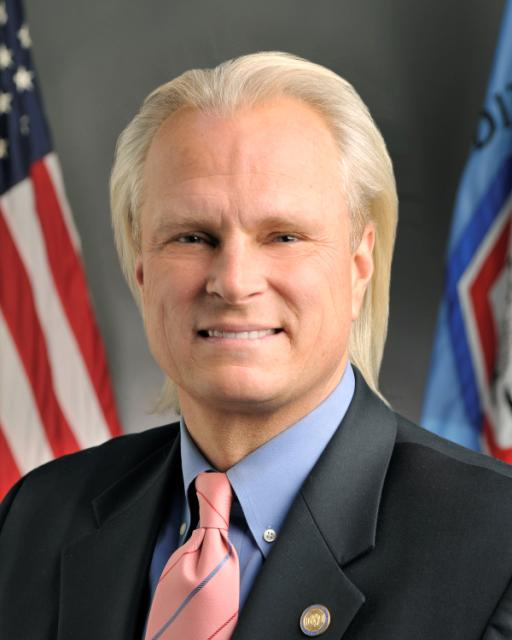

Member of the Commodity Futures Trading Commission
- In office August 8, 2007 – March 21, 2014
- President: George W. Bush; Barack Obama
- Preceded by: Reuben Jeffery III
- Succeeded by: Sharon Y. Bowen

Personal details
- Born: Bartholomew Hamilton Chilton; May 1, 1960 Wilmington, Delaware, U.S.
- Died: April 27, 2019 (aged 58) Washington, D.C., U.S.
- Party: Democratic
- Spouse: Sherry Daggett Chilton
- Education: Purdue University (1979-1982)
- Profession: Civil service

Bartholomew Hamilton Chilton (May 1, 1960 – April 27, 2019) was an American civil servant.

He was Commissioner at the Commodity Futures Trading Commission (CFTC) from 2007 to 2014. In April 2014, he joined DLA Piper as a Senior Policy Advisor. He was the author of the investment fraud book, Ponzimonium: How Scam Artists Are Ripping Off America. Chilton was a vocal supporter of position limits in commodities markets. He exposed manipulation practices in commodities markets and went on record as wanting to prosecute violations of law, which he believed had taken place in the silver market.

== Early life ==
Chilton was born in Wilmington, Delaware, and grew up in Ogden Dunes, Indiana. His father and both grandfathers were engineers. His father, a mechanical engineer, patented a way to create a self-standing artificial Christmas tree. DuPont's Thomas H. Chilton Laboratory in Wilmington, Delaware, is named for his grandfather, a chemical engineer who worked there. Jess M. Bartholomew, Chilton's namesake, was an electrical engineer at the Joy Manufacturing Company in Michigan City, Indiana. His great-great-grandfather was William Parish Chilton and his great-great-uncle was Thomas Chilton, who both served in government.

After high school, Chilton worked at a steel mill for a year, arguing later that the experience convinced him that someone had to look out for "the little guy". He began attending Purdue University in 1979, majoring in political science and communications but left one semester before graduating to work on Democratic Party 1984 political campaigns.

== Government career ==
Chilton worked in the U.S. House of Representatives from 1985 to 1995, where he was legislative director for three members of Congress and was the executive director of the Congressional Rural Caucus. He later worked in the executive branch during the Bill Clinton and George W. Bush administrations, where he became the deputy chief of staff to U.S. Secretary of Agriculture Dan Glickman and served as a liaison to the U.S. Department of Agriculture. From 2001 to 2005, he was a senior advisor to Senator Tom Daschle. In 2005, he went to the Farm Credit Administration, where he was an executive assistant to the board, afterward becoming chief of staff and vice president for governmental relations at the National Farmers Union, representing family farmers.

Chilton was one of the five CFTC commissioners from August 2007, when he was confirmed by the U.S. Senate after having been nominated by President Bush. He was the chairman of the CFTC's Energy and Environmental Markets Advisory Committee. He was re-nominated by President Barack Obama and re-confirmed by the Senate in 2009. In his first official remarks as a new commissioner on the CFTC, Chilton made clear his support for market regulation and has, since joining the CFTC, worked for the implementation of position limits.

In early 2010, he was contacted by Andrew Maguire, who detailed fraud taking place in the precious metals markets. Chilton had one of the senior investigators from the CFTC's enforcement division contact Maguire. Maguire shared information in an hour-long telephone interview and detailed e-mails. Maguire accurately predicted a manipulative event in the silver futures market, notifying Chilton and the investigator two days in advance and sending additional e-mails while it was taking place, pointing out important data.

Chilton believed violations of law have taken place in the silver futures market and said he wanted to see prosecutions. Gold Anti-Trust Action Committee board member Adrian Douglas referred to Chilton "the modern-day equivalent of Eliot Ness".

Beginning in 2010, Chilton began publicly raising concerns over High-frequency trading, questioning whether their role was counter to the fundamental purposes of financial markets.

On April 15, 2011, Chilton issued a statement against legislation to delay the financial regulatory reforms in the Dodd-Frank Act.

In July 2013, Chilton replaced outgoing Commissioner Jill Sommers as Chair of the Global Markets Advisory Committee (GMAC).

== Post government career ==
In 2014, shortly after leaving the CFTC, Chilton joined the lobbying firm DLA Piper, where as a senior policy advisor he worked with the Modern Markets Initiative, an advocacy group for the high-frequency trading Chilton had criticized while in office.

Chilton joined RT America in 2018 as host of Russian network's financial television show Boom Bust.

== Death ==
Chilton died from complications of pancreatic cancer on April 27, 2019, at a hospital in Washington, D.C.

== Personal life ==
Chilton was married to Sherry Daggett Chilton, and in his last years lived in Gulf Breeze, Florida. A distinctive figure in his political and media career, he sported shoulder-length blond hair and liked to wear cowboy boots.
