= Lake Chilton =

Lake in the state of Florida, United States

- Location within Florida
- Location: Highlands County, Florida
- Coordinates: 27°37′55″N 81°33′23″W
- Type: lake
- Max. length: 1,200 feet (370 m)
- Max. width: 1,200 feet (370 m)
- Max. depth: 22 feet (6.7 m)

Lake Chilton is a natural circular lake within the Avon Park Lakes, Florida, community. It is small, measuring approximately 1,200 feet (370 m) by 1,200 feet (370 m) and has a maximum depth of about 22 feet (6.7 m). It is bounded on all sides by residential streets and houses almost completely surround the lake on the opposite side of the streets. The land immediately surrounding the lake is public land. Lake Chilton is three blocks west of Lake Olivia.

The only activities at the lake are boating and fishing.
