= Chilton House =

Historic house in West Virginia, United States

- U.S. National Register of Historic Places
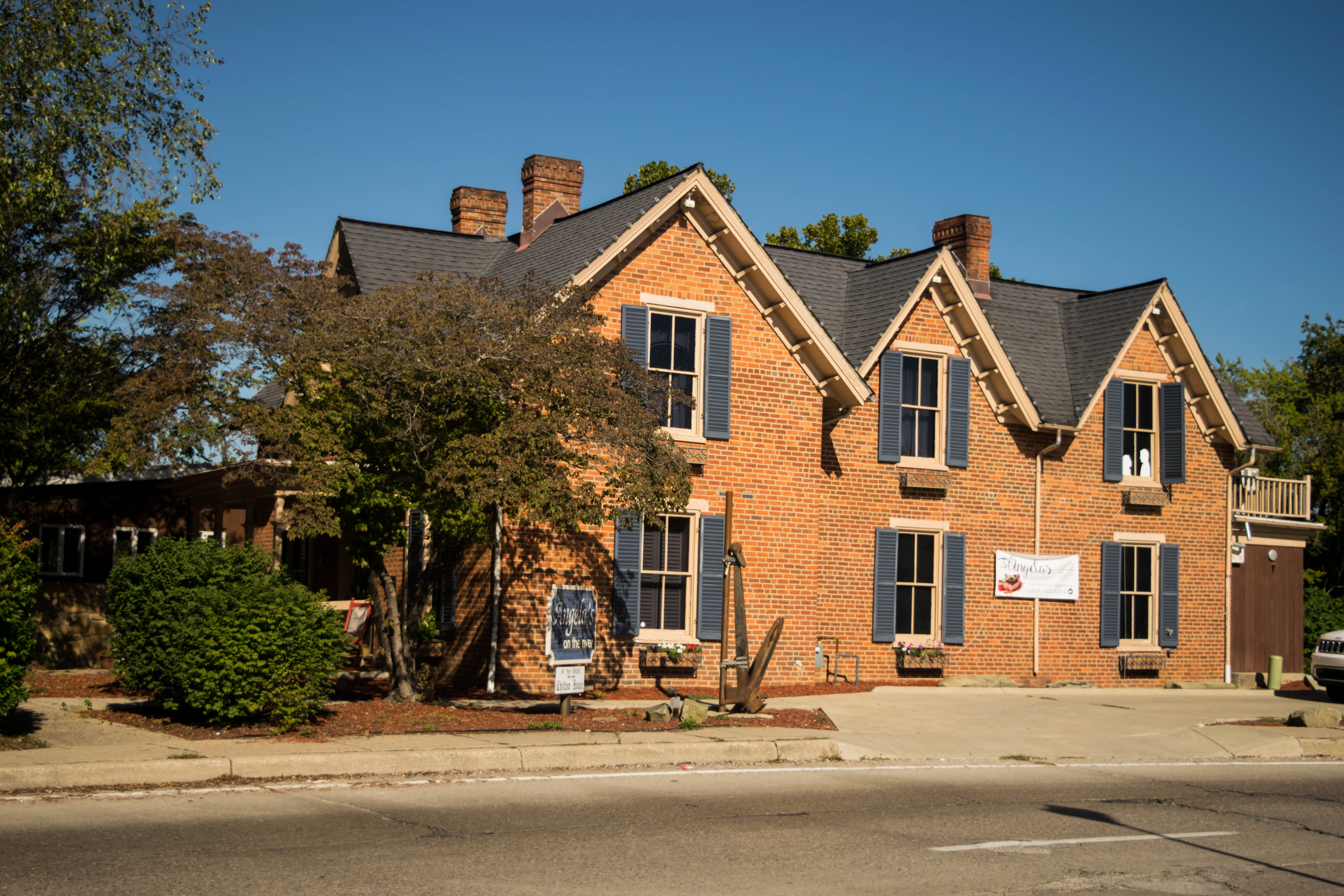

- Location within West Virginia Location within the United States
- Location: Off U.S. 60, St. Albans, West Virginia
- Coordinates: 38°23′13″N 81°50′24″W
- Area: 1 acre (0.40 ha)
- Built: 1857
- Architectural style: Gothic Revival
- NRHP reference No.: 77001376
- Added to NRHP: April 29, 1977

Chilton House is a historic home located at St. Albans, Kanawha County, West Virginia. It was built in 1857, and is a T-shaped brick dwelling in the Gothic Revival style. The roof structure has a total of seven gables, three in the head and four in the leg of its "T" shape.

In 1883, the house became the property of William and Mary Chilton, whose son Senator William E. Chilton (1858-1939) was a frequent visitor.

The house was moved in 1975, approximately 200 yards to its new location and set on a cinder block and sandstone foundation.

It was listed on the National Register of Historic Places in 1977.

Currently, the building is occupied by Angela’s On The River, a family restaurant.
