= Thomas H. Chilton =

American chemical engineer

Thomas H. Chilton (August 14, 1899 – September 15, 1972) was a chemical engineer and professor. He is considered a founder of modern chemical engineering practice and lectured widely around the world. He received numerous awards, including an honorary doctorate and the President's Certificate of Merit. In 1994, DuPont named a laboratory in Wilmington, Delaware for him.

== Biography ==
Thomas Hamilton Chilton was born in Greensboro, Alabama, son of a Methodist Episcopal clergyman, poet and hymnodist, Claudius Lysias Chilton, and Mabel Pierce Chilton. He was given the middle name Hamilton to honor a friend of the family. Chilton grew up in Montgomery, Alabama with the peculiar distinction of being the ninth child of a ninth child of a ninth child. Two older brothers founded Paragon Press and put him to work at a printing press, setting type by hand, which taught him to be attentive to detail. He attended Sidney Lanier High School in Montgomery, where he heard an employee of Thomas Edison explain how to make synthetic phonograph records. This sparked an interest in chemical engineering.

Chilton attended the University of Alabama for two semesters, quitting to earn money for tuition. He moved to New York City in 1917, moving in with his eldest brother. He attended Columbia University, graduating in 1922 with a degree in chemical engineering. He began work as a research chemist in New York, receiving his first patent. In 1925, he joined DuPont in Wilmington, Delaware, beginning what became a 35-year career leading its chemical research. Chilton began his career just as chemical engineering was becoming established as its own discipline and he is considered to be one of the founders of modern chemical engineering practice. He and a colleague developed the Chilton-Colburn analogy, which became a fundamental principle of chemical engineering. Chilton was known for his work on fluid flow, heat transfer, distillation and absorption. He began lecturing at universities in 1937.

Chilton worked at DuPont from 1925 to 1959, leading its chemical research. During World War II, he worked with the Manhattan Project and he was involved with the original design of the first atomic energy plant, the Hanford Engineer Works. At the invitation of his colleague and friend, Enrico Fermi, Chilton was among the select group of scientists to witness the first self-sustaining nuclear reaction at Stagg Field on December 2, 1942. After the war, he became involved in the Savannah River Plant, then the largest nuclear power plant ever built by the Atomic Energy Commission.

Upon his retirement, Chilton, who was known for being very particular about punctuation, was presented by his co-workers with a book that was entirely bereft of punctuation until the back of the book, where there was a page of periods, commas, semicolons, colons and other punctuation, accompanied by an invitation for him to insert them at his discretion.

Chilton was active in the American Institute of Chemical Engineers and served as its president in 1951. Following his career at DuPont, Chilton was a visiting professor and lecturer all over the world, including the University of Kyoto and Nagoya University, where he was a Fulbright lecturer; the University of New South Wales in Australia; and universities in Toulouse and Nancy, France, again as a Fulbright lecturer. He also lectured at the Birla Institute of Technology and Science in Pilani, India and the University of Natal in South Africa. His stints at American universities included the University of California, Berkeley, Georgia Tech, the University of Delaware, the University of Washington, the University of Massachusetts Amherst and the University of Alabama.

Chilton died in Bonn, Germany while traveling with his second wife.

== Awards and recognition ==
Chilton was awarded an honorary Doctor of Science from the University of Delaware in 1943. He received several awards from his alma mater, the Charles Frederick Chandler Medal in 1939, the Egleston Medal in 1942 and in 1950, the University Medal, which was presented to him by President Dwight D. Eisenhower. In 1948, he received the President's Certificate of Merit for his contributions to the National Defense Research Committee. Chilton was posthumously awarded the Lavoisier Medal for excellence. In 1994, the building where he had conducted much of his work for DuPont was named after him.

== Personal ==
Chilton spoke fluent French and enjoyed classical music. He had a collection of photographic slides from his world travels. As a boy Thomas began the hobby of collecting automobile license plates. Eventually, he was recognized as having the world's largest collection (some 4,500) from all over the United States and around the world. In 1967, an article about this amazing collection appeared in Sports Illustrated. His first wife was Cherridah McLemore and after her death, he married Elizabeth C. Rinehart, who, along with her late husband, had been friends of the Chiltons for decades.

Thomas H. Chilton is a grandson of William Parish Chilton, a member of the congress of the Confederate States of America and the Chief Justice of the Alabama Supreme Court. In 1967 he published a genealogical reference called "Antecedents and Descendants of William Parish Chilton, 1810 - 1871". " Bart Chilton, a former commissioner on the Commodity Futures Trading Commission, is his grandson.

== Publications ==
- Mass transfer (absorption) coefficients: Prediction from data on heat transfer and fluid friction (1934)
- Distillation and absorption in packed columns: Convenient design and correlation method (1935)
- The manufacture of nitric acid by the oxidation of ammonia: The Du Pont pressure process (1960)
- Antecedents and descendants of William Parish Chilton: 1810-1871 (1967)
- Strong Water Nitric Acid: Sources and Methods of Manufacture, and Uses, MIT Press (1968) ASIN B001S9AHFK
