= Chilton High School (Texas) =

Coordinates: 31.2852°N 97.0629°W

Location
- 905 Durango Ave; Chilton, Texas 76632; United States

Information
- School type: Public high school
- School district: Chilton Independent School District
- Principal: Brandon Hubbard
- Staff: 40.55 (FTE)
- Grades: PK-12
- Enrollment: 566 (2024–2025)
- Student to teacher ratio: 13.96
- Colors: Blue, black, and white
- Athletics conference: UIL Class AA
- Mascot: Pirate
- Yearbook: Pirate
- Website: Chilton High School

Chilton High School or Chilton School is a public high school located in Chilton, Texas (USA) and classified as a 2A school by the UIL. It is part of the Chilton Independent School District located in northwestern Falls County. In 2015, the school was rated "Met Standard" by the Texas Education Agency.

== Athletics ==
The Chilton Pirates compete in these sports -

Volleyball, Football, Cheerleading, Basketball, Powerlifting, Golf, Tennis & Track.

=== State titles ===
- Football -
  - 1972(B), 2006(1A/D2)
- Boys Track -
  - 1993(1A)

They also are four-time 1A State Champions in Individual Girls Golf 2006-2009 (Gabby Dominguez)

Chilton also had a 400 Meter State Champion in 2015 (Norvell Alston Jr)
