= Reynolds analogy =

Analogy in fluid dynamics

The Reynolds Analogy is popularly known to relate turbulent momentum and heat transfer. That is because in a turbulent flow (in a pipe or in a boundary layer) the transport of momentum and the transport of heat largely depends on the same turbulent eddies: the velocity and the temperature profiles have the same shape.

The main assumption is that wall heat flux $\dot{q}_w$ in a turbulent system is analogous to momentum flux, or wall shear stress, $\tau_w$, which suggests that the ratio $\frac{\tau_w}{\dot{q}_w}$ must be constant for similar geometry. A common example for "similar geometry" is every radial position around a pipe at some cross-section with circular shape.

If the wall shear stress ($\tau_w$) is known, a relation for the turbulent heat flux ($\dot{q}_w$) can be found (or vice versa), making it a useful analogy for pipe flows and hypersonic applications where $\tau_w$ may be more easily estimated than $\dot{q}_w$.

This is often used to estimate wall heat flux on a body in a flow:

$$\dot{q}_w \approx \frac{\tau_wc_p(T_w-T_{\infty})}{u_{\infty}}$$

where:

- $T_w,T_{\infty}$ are the temperatures of the wall and freestream (or bulk, depending on application), respectively;
- $c_p$ is the specific heat capacity at constant pressure for the fluid;
- $u_{\infty}$ is the freestream (or bulk, depending on application) fluid velocity.

The complete Reynolds analogy (in a form more often seen in relation to pipe flows) is:

$$\frac{f}{2} = \frac{h}{c_p G} = \frac{k'_c}{v_\text{avg}}$$

where:

- $f$ is the Fanning friction factor;
- $h$ is the heat transfer coefficient;
- $c_p$ is the specific heat at constant pressure;
- $G$ is the mass velocity (mass flow rate per unit area).

Experimental data for gas streams agree approximately with above equation if the Schmidt and Prandtl ($Pr$) numbers are near 1.0 and only skin friction is present in flow past a flat plate or inside a pipe. When liquids are present and/or form drag is present, the analogy is conventionally known to be invalid.

In 2008, the qualitative validity of Reynolds' analogy was re-visited for laminar flow of an incompressible fluid with variable dynamic viscosity ($\mu$). It was shown that the inverse dependence of Reynolds number ($Re$) and skin friction coefficient ($C_f$) is the basis for the validity of the analogy in both constant and variable $\mu$ flows.

For $\mu = \text{const.}$, the analogy reduces to the popular form where the Stanton number ($C_h\text{ or }St$) increases with increasing $Re$. For variable $\mu$, it reduces to $C_h$ increasing with decreasing $Re$.

This is represented by:

$$s=\frac{2C_h}{C_f}\approx \text{constant}$$

where:

- $s$ is the Reynolds analogy factor which is coupled to the Prandtl number via $sPr\approx 0.8$;
- $C_f$ is the skin friction coefficient given by $C_f=2\tau_w/(\rho_{\infty}u^2_{\infty})$;
  - $\rho_{\infty}$ is the freestream fluid density;
- $C_h$ is the Stanton number (also often denoted $St$). In supersonic/hypersonic applications, the Stanton Number is $C_h=\dot{q}_w/ (\rho_{\infty}u_{\infty}c_p(T_w-T_r))$;
  - $T_r$ is the recovery temperature, $T_r=T_{\infty}+Pr^{1/3}(\gamma-1)M^2_{\infty}/2$;
    - $\gamma$ is the ratio of specific heats, $\gamma=c_p/c_v$;
    - $M_{\infty}$ is the freestream Mach number.

Consequently, the Chilton–Colburn analogy is qualitatively valid whenever the Reynolds' analogy is valid. Furthermore, the validity of the analogy is linked to the applicability of Prigogine's Theorem of Minimum Entropy Production. Thus, Reynolds' analogy is valid for flows that are close to being fully developed, where changes in the gradients of velocity and temperature along the flow are small.

== See also ==
- Reynolds number
- Chilton and Colburn J-factor analogy
