= Shilton (surname) =

Shilton is a surname and given name. Notable people with the name include:

- Billy Shilton (born 1998), British Paralympic table tennis player
- John Shilton (1861–1899), English cricketer, rugby and football player
- Lance Shilton (1921–1998), Australian Anglican cleric
- Leni Shilton, Australian poet, teacher and researcher
- Les Shilton (1923–1995), Australian politician
- Peter Shilton (born 1949), British football player
- Sam Shilton (born 1978), British football player

given name

- Shilton D'Silva (born 1992), Indian football player
- Shilton dos Santos, Brazilian basketball player
- Shilton Paul, Indian football player
