= West Virginia's at-large congressional district =

1913–1917 US congressional district

Coordinates: 39°N 80.5°W

- Obsolete district
- Created: 1912
- Eliminated: 1917
- Years active: 1913-1917

West Virginia gained a sixth seat in the United States House of Representatives after the 1910 census, but failed to adopt a new redistricting plan immediately. In 1912 and 1914, the state elected Howard Sutherland at-large from the entire state, in addition to its five districted representatives.

The at-large seat was eliminated after a six-district plan was adopted in time for the 1916 elections.

== List of members representing the district ==
Member	Party	Years	Cong ress	Electoral history
District established March 4, 1913
Howard Sutherland (Elkins)	Republican	March 4, 1913 – March 3, 1917	63rd 64th	Elected in 1912. Re-elected in 1914. Retired to run for U.S. senator.
District dissolved March 3, 1917
