= Great Chilton =

Village in County Durham, England

Coordinates: 54.667°N 1.540°W

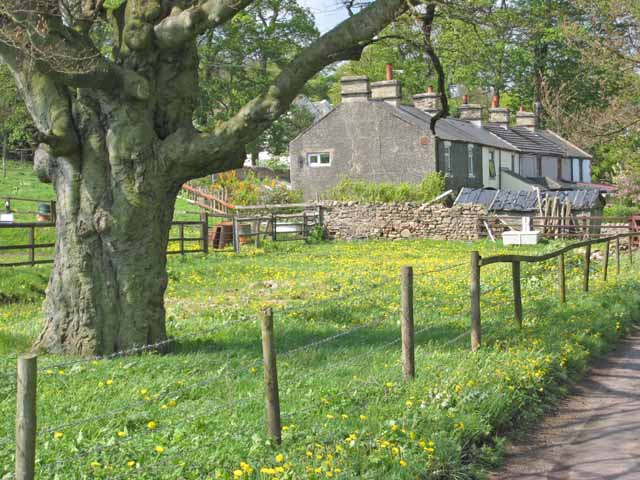
- Cottages at Great Chilton

- Location within County Durham
- OS grid reference: NZ297303
- Unitary authority: County Durham
- Ceremonial county: County Durham
- Region: North East
- Country: England
- Sovereign state: United Kingdom
- Post town: DARLINGTON
- Postcode district: DL17
- Police: Durham
- Fire: County Durham and Darlington
- Ambulance: North East

Great Chilton is a village in County Durham, in England. It is situated to the east of Bishop Auckland, near Chilton.
