= Chilton and Colburn J-factor analogy =

Analogy for heat, momentum, and mass transfer

Chilton–Colburn J-factor analogy (also known as the modified Reynolds analogy) is a successful and widely used analogy between heat, momentum, and mass transfer. The basic mechanisms and mathematics of heat, mass, and momentum transport are essentially the same. Among many analogies (like Reynolds analogy, Prandtl–Taylor analogy) developed to directly relate heat transfer coefficients, mass transfer coefficients and friction factors, Chilton and Colburn J-factor analogy proved to be the most accurate. The factors are named after Thomas H. Chilton and Allan Philip Colburn (1904–1955).

It is written as follows,

$J_M=\frac{f}{2} = J_H = \frac{h}{c_p\, G}\,{Pr}^{\frac{2}{3}}= J_D = \frac{k'_c}{\overline{v}} \cdot {Sc}^{\frac{2}{3}}$

This equation permits the prediction of an unknown transfer coefficient when one of the other coefficients is known. The analogy is valid for fully developed turbulent flow in conduits with Re > 10000, 0.7 < Pr < 160, and tubes where L/d > 60 (the same constraints as the Sieder–Tate correlation). The wider range of data can be correlated by Friend–Metzner analogy.

Relationship between Heat and Mass;

$J_M = \frac{f}{2} = \frac{Sh}{Re\, Sc^{\frac{1}{3}}} = J_H = \frac{f}{2} = \frac{Nu}{Re\, Pr^{\frac{1}{3}}}$

== See also ==
- Reynolds analogy
