= Lake Olivia =

Lake in the state of Florida, United States

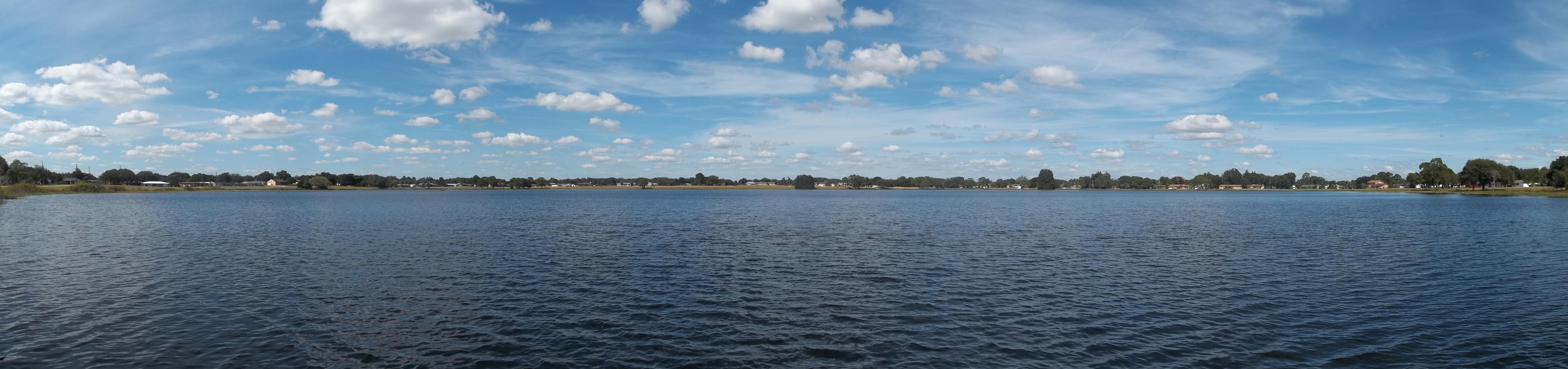

- Location within Florida Location within the United States
- Location: Highlands County, Florida
- Coordinates: 27°37′57″N 81°32′52″W
- Basin countries: United States
- Surface area: 89 acres (36 ha)
- Max. depth: 45 ft (14 m)

Lake Olivia is an 89-acre (360,000 m^{2}) freshwater lake located within the Avon Park Lakes subdivision in northwest Highlands County, Florida. It is located northwest of the incorporated city of Avon Park. Maximum depth is about 45 feet (14 m), with a fairly steep contour to the depth. The lake's shape is round. There were many years of drought, depleting the lake's water volume. The last two years saw more rain and a swampy area now surrounds almost all of Lake Olivia.

Fishing, walking and boating are popular activities. Fishing is apparently more productive at Lake Olivia than some other lakes. Almost daily people fish the south shore and many days people fish from boats in the lake. A reviewer wrote in the Fishing Works website he always catches numerous small fish at the lake. Until recently, there was swimming at three locations. Officially swimming has not been allowed for years, although this provision has not been enforced until July 2010. Now swimming is completely forbidden. The decision by Highlands County to forbid swimming was detailed in the April 2011 Avon Park Lakes Association Newsletter: "It seems the county put the signs up for two reasons; 1) the lake is not routinely tested by the county for the things other lakes are tested for and; 2) there are no bathroom facilities in the area for use by swimmers."

For a time, some of the amenities of Lake Olivia were a bit dilapidated. An old fishing dock was removed in 2008. Between 2009 and 2012, numerous improvements were made. Amenities include three public boat ramps. One of the ramps is currently unusable, as the water level has been low since 2007. The main boat ramp, on the south side of Lake Olivia, was partially replaced in March 2012. At the same time a new and larger fishing dock was built to replace the dilapidated one removed in 2008. A paved sidewalk surrounds the lake and covers approximately 1½ miles. Many of the paving slabs were replaced between 2009 and 2011. Nautilus Drive completely surrounds the sidewalk. The entire shore is public parkland. Residential houses completely line Nautilus Drive opposite the sidewalk.
