= William Parish Chilton =

American judge (1810–1871)

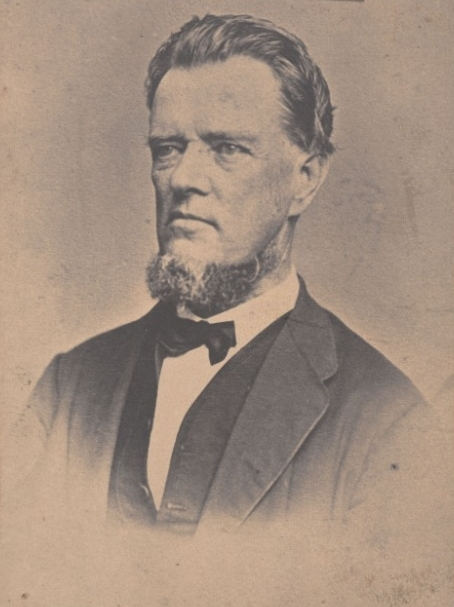

Deputy from Alabama to the Provisional Congress of the Confederate States
- In office February 4, 1861 – February 17, 1862
- Preceded by: New constituency
- Succeeded by: Constituency abolished

Personal details
- Born: August 10, 1810 Columbia, Kentucky, U.S.
- Died: January 20, 1871 (aged 60) Montgomery, Alabama, U.S.
- Party: Whig
- Relations: Thomas Chilton (brother)

William Parish Chilton (August 10, 1810 – January 20, 1871) was an American politician and author who served as a Deputy from Alabama to the Provisional Congress of the Confederate States from 1861 to 1862.

== Early life ==
Called Will Chilton, he was born in Columbia, Kentucky, on August 10, 1810, the ninth child of Rev. Thomas John Chilton (a slave-owning Baptist minister) and Margaret Bledsoe, sister of Jesse Bledsoe. He was a younger brother of Thomas Chilton, Representative from Kentucky and ghost writer of an "autobiography" by David Crockett. When Chilton was 14 months old his large family was among the victims of the 1811–12 New Madrid earthquakes. As a teenager he left home to live in Tennessee with an older sister, Jane, and her husband Charles Metcalfe. He read law with Return J. Meigs III in Athens, Tennessee, passed the bar in 1828, and began to practice law.

== Career ==
In 1831 Chilton moved to Talladega, Alabama. In 1839 he was elected as a Whig to represent his county in the Alabama House of Representatives. Chilton campaigned vigorously for William Henry Harrison in 1840 and Henry Clay in 1844. In 1843 he was an unsuccessful candidate for Congress. While practicing law in Talladega, he tutored his brother-in-law John Tyler Morgan, who passed the bar in 1845. In 1846 he established a law school in Tuskegee. On December 31, 1847, the state legislature elected Chilton an associate justice of the Alabama Supreme Court. He became Chief Justice December 2, 1852 and served until January 2, 1856. After retiring from the bench, he established a law partnership with William Lowndes Yancey. In 1859 he was elected to the state Senate from Macon County.

== American Civil War ==
Chilton originally opposed secession, but once Alabama decided to join the Confederate States of America he became a supporter. Elected to the Provisional Congress of the Confederate States, which met in Montgomery on February 4, 1861, it was Chilton's task to call the convention to order as the representative of the district where the body met. After electing Howell Cobb as presiding officer, on February 9 the Provisional Congress elected Jefferson Davis as president. On February 18, Davis arrived in Montgomery to take his oath of office; he was escorted into the capitol building by Chilton and Robert Rhett. After Davis completed his speech to the Provisional Congress, in which he indicated that he would accept the presidency, Chilton made a motion that the body adjourn and then reconvene on the front steps of the capitol, making possible the well-known photos of Davis taking his oath of office. Members of the Provisional Congress were divided on the choice of a permanent capital. Chilton advocated for Montgomery so forcefully that he earned the disaffection of colleagues who advocated for Richmond, Virginia, which was eventually chosen.

Chilton won election to the First and 2nd Confederate States Congress. After the war he returned to Montgomery, both physically worn out from his legislative service and in constrained financial circumstances. When the Confederate Congress was not in session Chilton served as a private in Harrison's Company of Alabama Rebels, a home guard unit.

== Later life and death ==
After the war Chilton returned to practicing and teaching law, and writing; by 1870 he had managed to recoup most of his financial losses. He was also elected Grand Master of Alabama's Masonic Grand Lodge. In late 1870 or early 1871 Chilton was injured in a fall down the stairs. He died at his home in Montgomery on January 20, 1871.

== Personal life ==
Chilton's descendants included:

- Bart Chilton (great-great-grandson), U.S. Commodity Futures Trading Commission member
- Thomas H. Chilton (grandson), chemical engineer and professor
- Robert A. Lovett (great-grandson), U.S. Secretary of Defense

== Legacy ==
Chilton County, Alabama (established 1868 as Baker County, renamed Chilton in 1874), is named after him.

== Partial Bibliography and archives ==
- To the people of Alabama (1861) Montgomery, Alabama
- Sunday mail : report of the Committee on Post Offices and Post Roads. (1862), Confederate States of America. Congress. House of Representatives. Committee on Post Offices and Post Roads.
- Pardons, paroles, and clemency files, 1862–1863. by W P Chilton (archives of Alabama)
- Mansion of the skies (1875) Publisher: New York, J. Ross & Co.
- Columbia, a national poem (1880), Publisher: New York, The Authors' Pub. Co.; Montgomery, Ala., J. White
- The sacred dust : our Confederate dead : (in memoriam), 1886

Political offices
| New constituency | Deputy from Alabama to the Provisional Congress of the Confederate States; 1861–1862 | Constituency abolished |
