= William E. Chilton =

American politician (1858–1939)

William Chilton
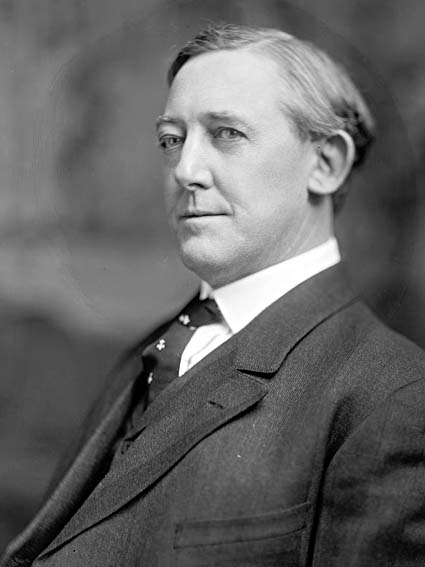

Secretary of the Senate Democratic Caucus
- In office March 4, 1911 – March 4, 1913
- Leader: Thomas S. Martin
- Preceded by: Robert L. Owen
- Succeeded by: Willard Saulsbury Jr.

United States Senator from West Virginia
- In office March 4, 1911 – March 4, 1917
- Preceded by: Nathan B. Scott
- Succeeded by: Howard Sutherland

Secretary of State of West Virginia
- In office March 4, 1893 – March 4, 1897
- Governor: William A. MacCorkle
- Preceded by: William Ohley
- Succeeded by: William M. O. Dawson

Personal details
- Born: William Edwin Chilton; March 17, 1858 Colesmouth, Virginia, U.S. (now St. Albans, West Virginia)
- Died: November 7, 1939 (aged 81) Charleston, West Virginia, U.S.
- Party: Democratic
- Education: Shelton College (BA)

William Edwin Chilton (March 17, 1858 – November 7, 1939) was a United States senator from West Virginia. Born in Colesmouth, Virginia (now St. Albans, West Virginia), he attended public and private schools and graduated from Shelton College in St. Albans. He taught school, studied law, and was admitted to the bar in 1880, commencing practice in Charleston, West Virginia in 1882. He also engaged in the newspaper publishing business and was prosecuting attorney of Kanawha County in 1883. In 1892, he was chairman of the Democratic State executive committee and was Secretary of State of West Virginia from 1893 to 1897.

Chilton was elected as a Democrat to the U.S. Senate and served from March 4, 1911, to March 3, 1917; while in the Senate, he was chairman of the Committee on Census (Sixty-third and Sixty-fourth Congresses) and of the Committee on Printing (Sixty-fourth Congress), and also served on the Senate Judiciary Committee. Chilton's bid for reelection in 1916 failed; he unsuccessfully contested the election of his opponent, Howard Sutherland.

After Chilton's term in the Senate, he resumed the practice of law and the newspaper publishing business in Charleston. He was an unsuccessful candidate for election to the Senate in 1924 and again in 1934. He died in Charleston in 1939; interment was in Teay's Hill Cemetery, St. Albans.

His parents' house at St. Albans, known as the Chilton House, was listed on the National Register of Historic Places in 1977.

== Personal life ==
Chilton didn't use a suffix in his lifetime, but was technically William Edwin Chilton Jr., as his parents were William Edwin Chilton (1827–1881) and Mary Elizabeth Wilson Chilton (1831–1918).

On December 19, 1892, he married Mary Louise Tarr (1866–1953) in Washington, D.C. They had four children:

- William Edwin Chilton III (1893–1950); because his father never used a suffix, this William was known as William Edwin Chilton Jr.; on June 19, 1920, in Kingston, New York, he married Louise Burt Schoonmaker (1899–1928).
  - William Edwin Chilton IV (1921–1987); typically referred to as William III.
  - Mary Carroll Chilton (1925–1971); married to and divorced from Park Vassar Chapman (1924–1994), a First Lieutenant in the United States Army during World War II and descendant of Matthew Vassar, founder of Vassar College; married secondly James Abbot.
    - Robert Laurent Chapman (1948-
    - Park Vassar Chapman Jr. (1953-
    - Carroll Louise Chapman
    - Alice Chilton Abbot
    - Leslie Ann Abbot
    - Karen Elizabeth Abbot
- Joseph Eustace Chilton (1895–1937)
- Eleanor Carroll Chilton (1898–1949), novelist and poet
- Elizabeth Leigh Chilton (1901–1986); married 1st Girard R. Lowrey (1899–1957) on November 27, 1920, in Manhattan, New York; married 2nd Douglas Murray/Murry.

His wife's niece, Louise Benedict Schoonmaker, married Robert V. Keeley, a United States diplomat.

== Career ==
At the dedication of the capital of West Virginia, Mr. Chilton introduced the speaker to be the founder of Mother's Day, Miss Anna Jarvis. As quoted, she stated "This beautiful moment and magnificent Capitol building is a fitting monument to the sacrifice, the devotion, the industry, and the hopes of West Virginia Mothers. This State has always shown the element of greatness. Today, this State honors its homes, and its Mothers as has no other state in this nation. Today, for the first time in history, the Mothers have a part in the dedication of a great public edifice. It is an honor to every West Virginia home, and a tribute to all Mothers. May we realize that this beautiful building stands for truth, for justice, for integrity, for progress, and for the hopes and ambitions of all West Virginia Mothers."

Political offices
Preceded by William Ohley	Secretary of State of West Virginia; 1893–1897	Succeeded by William M. O. Dawson
U.S. Senate
Preceded by Nathan B. Scott	U.S. Senator (Class 1) from West Virginia; 1911–1917; Served alongside: Clarence W. Watson, Nathan Goff Jr.	Succeeded by Howard Sutherland
Preceded by Robert M. La Follette	Chair of the Senate Census Committee; 1913–1916	Succeeded by Morris Sheppard
Preceded by Duncan U. Fletcher	Chair of the Senate Printing Committee; 1916–1917	Succeeded by Marcus A. Smith
Party political offices
Preceded by Robert Latham Owen	Secretary of the Senate Democratic Caucus; 1911–1913	Succeeded by Willard Saulsbury Jr.
First	Democratic nominee for U.S. Senator from West Virginia (Class 1); 1916	Succeeded by Matthew M. Neely
Preceded by Clarence Wayland Watson	Democratic nominee for U.S. Senator from West Virginia (Class 2); 1924	Succeeded by Matthew M. Neely
