= Gold bug =

Term for gold-focused investors

"Gold bug" (sometimes spelled "goldbug") is a term frequently employed in the financial sector and among economists in reference to persons who are extremely bullish on the commodity gold as an investment or a standard for measuring wealth. Depending on the circumstances the term can have one or a combination of closely related and often overlapping themes that extend beyond the support for gold as an investment, including in some cases the use of the term as a pejorative.

== Various themes on the term ==
- An investor or speculator who is very bullish in buying the commodity gold, or similarly themed financial products such as junior mining companies, gold certificates, bullion ETFs, and other derivative instruments related to precious metals.
- A person who opposes or criticizes the use of "fiat currency" and supports a return to the use of the gold standard or some other currency system based on the value of gold and other "hard" assets.
- Someone who considers one commodity, usually gold, "the appropriate measure of wealth, regardless of the quantity of other goods and services that it can buy".
- A person, often with views summarized above, that subscribes to "conspiracy theories" relating to gold & silver, frequently including but not limited to, alleged manipulation of the price of precious metals and the supposed disappearance of gold held by the United States Government at Fort Knox. The Gold Anti-Trust Action Committee (GATA) is a small but prominent promoter of such conspiracy theories within the gold bug community. However, such persons are widely dismissed as cranks and their beliefs as fringe by reputable economists, business leaders and government officials.

=== History ===
The concept, in the second sense, was popularized in the 1896 U.S. presidential election, when William McKinley supporters took to wearing gold lapel pins, gold neckties, and gold headbands in a demonstration of support for gold against the "silver menace".

=== Notable gold bugs ===
- Hugh McCulloch -27th and 36th U.S. Secretary of the Treasury
- Judy Shelton - Economist

== See also ==
- Digital gold currency
