= Drafting (aerodynamics) =

Aerodynamic technique

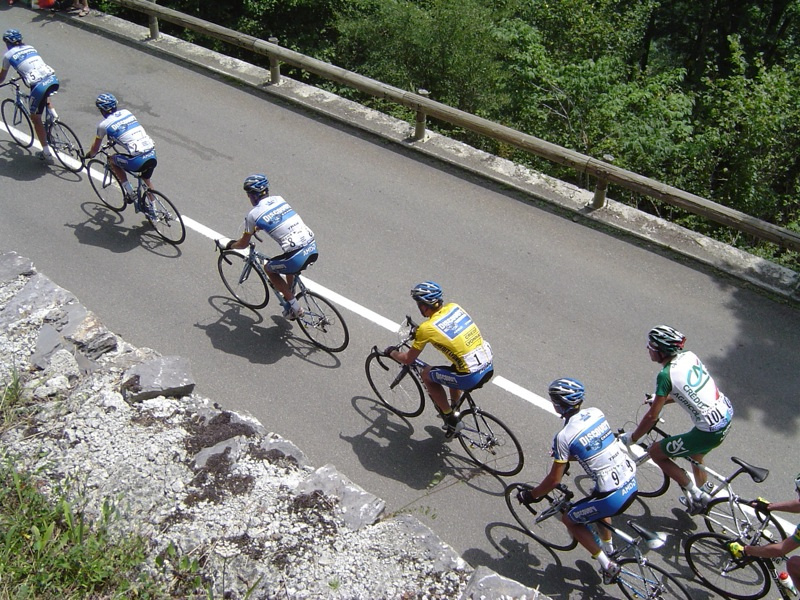
A paceline of drafting cyclists

Drafting, or slipstreaming, is an aerodynamic technique where two moving objects are aligning in a close group to exploit the lead object's slipstream and thus reduce the overall effect of drag. Especially when high speeds are involved, as in motor racing and cycling, drafting can significantly reduce the paceline's average energy expenditure and can even slightly reduce the energy expenditure of the lead vehicle.

== Drafting in sport ==
Drafting is used to reduce wind resistance and is seen most commonly in bicycle racing, motorcycle racing, car racing, and speedskating, though drafting is occasionally used even in cross-country skiing, downhill skateboarding, and running. Some forms of triathlon allow drafting. Drafting occurs in swimming as well: both in open-water races (occurring in natural bodies of water) and in traditional races in competition pools. In a competition pool a swimmer may hug the lane line that separates them from the swimmer they are abaft of thereby taking advantage of the liquid slipstream in the other swimmer's wake. Drafting also occurs in competitive longboarding.

It is believed, but not yet conclusively proven, that thoroughbred racing horses draft each other, especially in longer races.

Belgian tourniquet (Belgischer kreisel)

=== Cycling ===
In cycling, any time one bicyclist is riding behind another, energy is conserved, especially at higher speeds.

In road bicycle racing, the main (largest) group of tightly packed cyclists in a race is called a peloton where cyclists ride in a long formation with each (but not the first rider) drafting behind the others before them.

When cyclists ride fast they form a paceline. Each cyclist, except the first, is drafting behind another one. In order to ride very fast, a team of some skilled cyclists may form the "Belgian tourniquet". Successively, each cyclist leads the group. Drafting can be cooperative: several competitors take turns in the lead position (which requires the most effort and energy consumption). It can also be competitive or tactical: one competitor will try to stay closely behind another, leaving the follower with more energy for a break-away push to the finish line.

=== Running ===
Drafting behind another runner can conserve energy when facing a headwind. Generally the effect is much less pronounced than in cycling due to lower speeds.

Nike worked with the aerodynamics expert Robby Ketchell at the University of New Hampshire to experiment with and select a formation of pacemakers that would best minimize drag on the professionals it sponsored in the project it termed Breaking2. A Wired magazine report that interviewed various experts affiliated and unaffiliated with Nike found they universally expected more coordinated pacing efforts to occur in running after Breaking2, with two of the quoted experts predicting that behavior like "cooperative drafting", or races that incentivize cycling-peloton-like behavior could improve running times.

=== Motorsport ===
==== Road racing ====
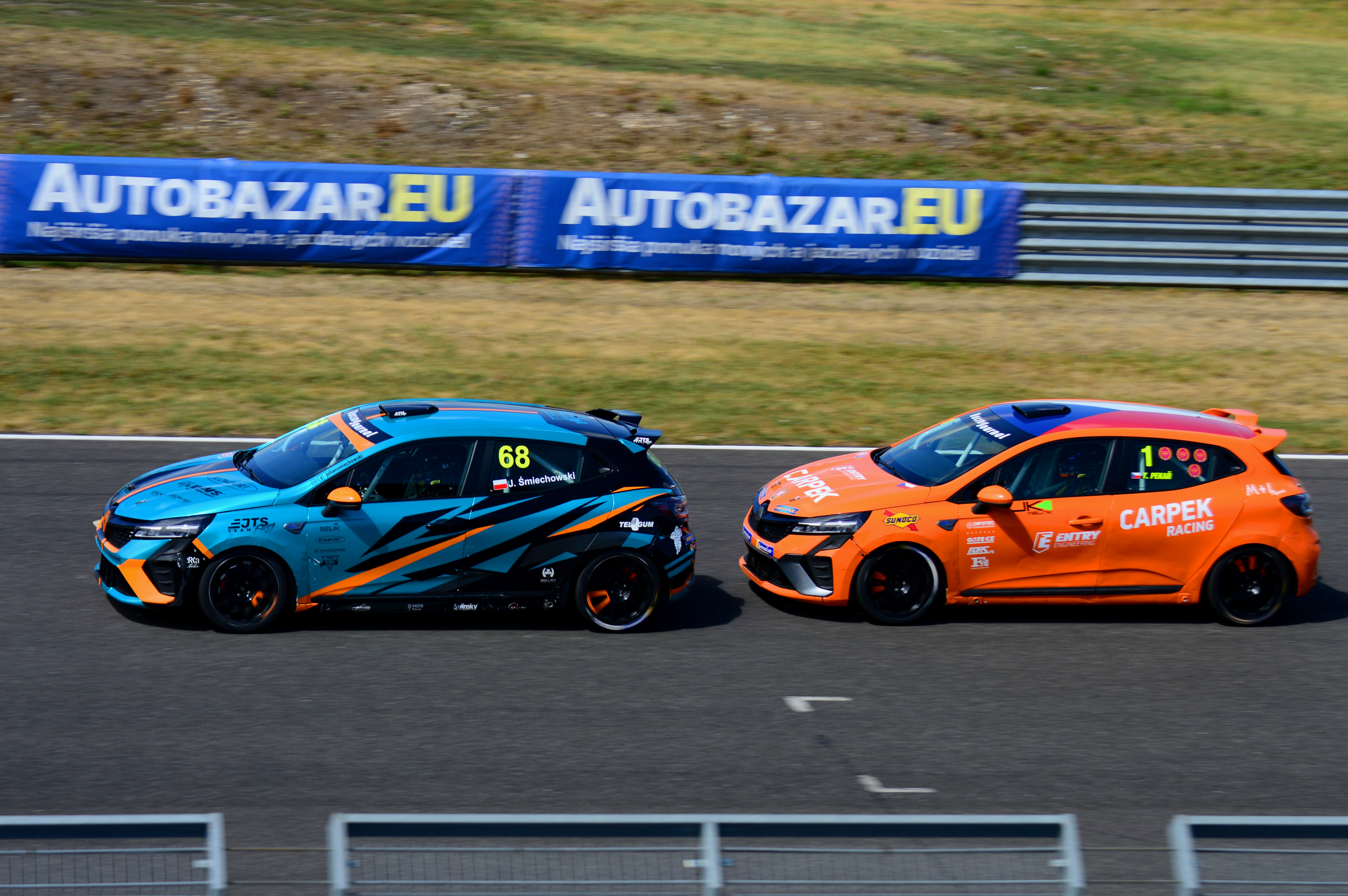
An example of slipstreaming in a Renault Clio Cup race

In single seater, open wheel racing series such as Formula One and the IndyCar Series, as well as to a lesser extent in sports car racing, a technique known as slipstreaming is used. Along a long straight a car following close behind another uses the slipstream created by the lead car to close the gap between them, hoping to be able to overtake the leader under braking for the next corner, or if they have a straightline speed advantage, to pass on the straight. However it is very difficult for cars to follow each other close together in fast corners as the "dirty" (turbulent) air that comes off the lead car unbalances the trailing car as its aerodynamic devices provide less grip.

==== Stock car racing ====
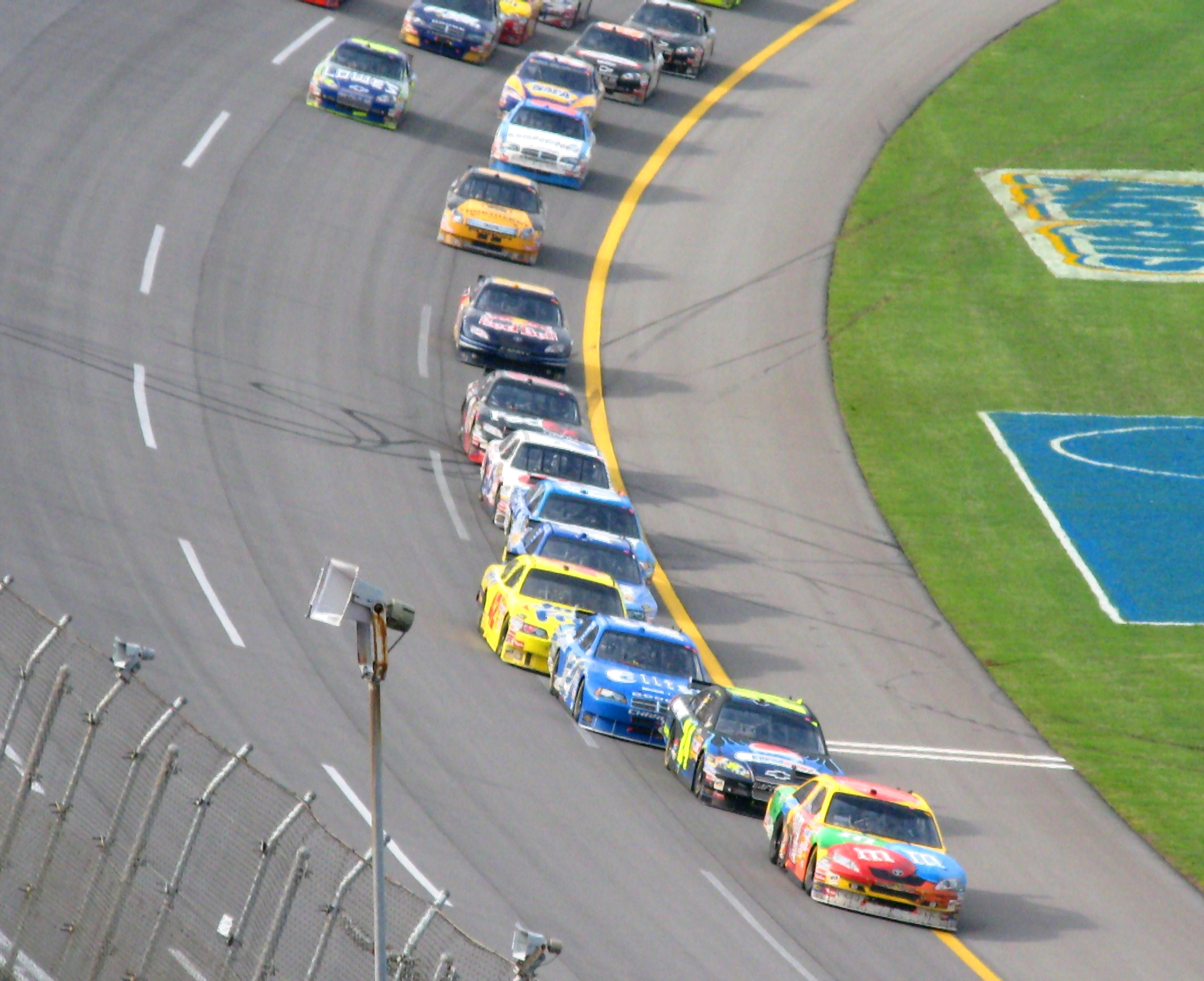
A line of cars at Talladega Superspeedway utilizing the slipstream of leader Kyle Busch

On the faster speedways and superspeedways used by NASCAR and ARCA, two or more vehicles can race faster when lined up front-to-rear than a single car can race alone. The low-pressure wake behind a group's leading car reduces the aerodynamic resistance on the front of the trailing car, allowing the second car to pull closer. As the second car nears the first, it pushes high-pressure air forward so less fast-moving air hits the lead car's spoiler. The result is less drag for both cars, allowing faster speeds.

Handling in corners is affected by balance changes caused by the draft: the leading car has normal front downforce but less rear downforce. The trailing car has less front downforce but normal rear downforce. A car with drafting partners both ahead and behind will lose downforce at both ends.

Similar to the "Belgian tourniquet" in cycling, the "slingshot pass" is the most dramatic and widely noted maneuver associated with drafting. A trailing car (perhaps pushed by a line of drafting cars) uses the lead car's wake to pull up with maximum momentum at the end of a straightaway, enters a turn high, and turns down across the lead car's wake. The combination of running downhill and running across the zone of lowest aerodynamic drag allows the trailing car to carry extra speed and pass on the inside of the leader.

Drafting was discovered by stock car racers in the 1960 Daytona 500, when Junior Johnson found that he could use drafting as a strategy that helped him overcome the fact that his Chevrolet could not keep up with other cars, allowing him to win the race. Like Johnson, other drivers found they picked up speed running closely behind other cars, and as they experimented, they found that a line of cars could sustain higher speeds and/or use less fuel (resulting in fewer pit-stops) than a single car running by itself.

In recent years, as aerodynamics have become increasingly critical to the performance of stock cars on "intermediate" oval tracks (between 1.33 and 2 mi) and superspeedways not requiring restrictor plates (such as the Indianapolis Motor Speedway), the effect of turbulent, or "dirty", air when following closely behind another car has become much more akin to that described above in open-wheel racing (a situation described in NASCAR circles as aero push), and is often cited as a main reason for a decrease in the amount of overtakes.

==== Bump drafting ====
Drafting is most important at NASCAR's restrictor plate tracks, Talladega Superspeedway, Daytona International Speedway, and Atlanta Motor Speedway where the plates mean that much less power is available to push the large bodies through the air. Race cars reach their highest speeds on these superspeedways, so the aerodynamic forces are highest and the effects of drafting are strongest. Since restrictor plates were first used as a safety device, their effect has changed the nature of drafting. Vehicles no longer have sufficient horsepower or throttle response to maintain their drafting speeds upon exiting the draft; they can pull out and squeeze ahead but lack the response to clear the car being passed. This negates the slingshot maneuver. As a result, passing is often the result of cooperation between two or more drivers or is achieved by sucking air off the side of the car being passed, a technique called side-drafting.

Bump drafting is a tactic used at Talladega and Daytona. The technique was initially popularized by the Archer Brothers in the SCCA Sportruck series during the late 1980s. It begins as normal drafting, but the following car pulls up behind the lead car and bumps into the rear of it, pushing the lead car ahead, to maintain momentum.

If done roughly or in the wrong position (e.g. close to the entry of the turn), this tactic can destabilize the handling of the lead car, sometimes causing a crash. Use of the tactic in this manner is known as slam drafting. Due to the danger, NASCAR has attempted to limit the bracing on bumpers on cars, disallowed bump drafting in turns, introduced "no bump zones" on certain portions of speedways where this practice is prevalent, and penalized drivers who are too rough in bump drafting. The 2010 NASCAR season allowed drivers more freedom; bump drafting was allowed anywhere, including turns.

Kyle Busch is largely responsible for a different type of bump drafting, which is now referred to as "two-car drafting" and "tandem drafting". At a 2007 test session in Talladega, he asked Ryan Newman to push him from behind, and was stunned to realize he was two seconds faster with Newman's help. At the newly paved Daytona International Speedway in 2011, Busch was the first to realize that the corners were smooth enough to allow a two-car draft for the complete length of the track. During test sessions on the track, when Busch was pushed by his brother Kurt's Penske Racing teammate Brad Keselowski, they ran 15 mph faster than single cars. Other drivers quickly picked up on Busch's strategy, and the two-car draft dominated the 2011 Daytona 500 and Budweiser Shootout. This strategy had also been very prominent at Talladega. In 2011, two-car tandem drafting was used for the extent of the Aaron's 499, with many drivers drafting their own teammates (e.g., Jimmie Johnson and Dale Earnhardt Jr. drafted together, as did Jeff Gordon and Mark Martin). For the 2012 season, the Sprint Cup series cars were modified in a way that made the tandem impossible, in order to return to pack racing. In 2014, bump drafting was banned by NASCAR in the Nationwide Series and Camping World Truck Series. Tandem drafting made a return when NASCAR removed the restrictor plate and replaced them with tapered spacers, and with the flat noses and bumpers of the modern Gen 6 cars, drivers could more easily tandem and gain speed, much like the early 2010s. After Ryan Newman's scary crash in the 2020 Daytona 500, NASCAR made efforts to change drafting at superspeedways, where less horsepower was used: the removal of aero ducts to eliminate tandem drafting and decrease closing rates, and a smaller throttle body to lower the amount of air into a racecar.

== Tailgating and hypermiling ==
Some drivers have been known to draft behind other vehicles, particularly tailgating larger vehicles, to save fuel. For example, hypermilers using this technique can achieve 75 mpg or more (a 10% increase in efficiency of certain hybrid vehicles). Some sources say that the most common tailgating does not save gasoline even at freeway speeds because one is likely to accelerate and brake so frequently that any aerodynamic savings are lost through the brakes.

On the show MythBusters, drafting behind an 18-wheeler truck was tested and results showed that traveling 100 feet (30 m) behind the truck increased overall mpg efficiency by 11%. Traveling 10 feet (3.0 m) behind the truck produced a 39% gain in efficiency. Additionally, on the same episode, MythBusters demonstrated that it can be very dangerous for the following car if one of the truck's tires (or their recaps) delaminate, as the chunks of ejected rubber can be large enough to cause serious harm, even death, to a driver following too closely.

Drafters also face the danger that, if the vehicle in front stops suddenly, there is little time for a human to react. Electronic devices can react much quicker and more reliable, thus Platooning is under study as a means to get the benefits while also increasing safety.

== Computer simulation of drafting ==
Computer simulation (computational fluid dynamics or CFD) is increasingly being used to analyse drafting. It is important to understand the aerodynamic behaviour of a motor vehicle when drafting, for example if the rear car is too close to the front car, the air supply to its radiator will be reduced and there is a possibility of the engine overheating. Most motor sport aerodynamic analysis is performed using wind tunnel testing. This becomes difficult for drafting cases, if only because a very large wind tunnel is needed. CFD, a kind of virtual wind tunnel, is used by race teams to understand the car's performance while drafting.

== Drafting in nature ==
Animals have been observed to use true drafting behavior reminiscent of auto racing or cycling. Caribbean spiny lobsters for example are known to migrate in close single-file formation "lobster trains".

== Vortex surfing ==
Vortex surfing is a related phenomenon that is currently being investigated by the US Air Force to save fuel on long-distance flights. The idea is to fly aircraft in the upward part of the wingtip vortex of a leading aircraft. In 2003, NASA said one of its F/A-18 test aircraft had a 29% fuel savings by flying in the wingtip vortex of a DC-8. The DC-8/F-18 flight was an exploratory investigation of large aircraft vortex-induced performance benefits on a fighter-type aircraft. The aircraft flew at 25,000 feet with a separation of about 200 feet nose-to-tail. The F/A-18 slowly moved in laterally to explore the vortex effects, NASA said at the time. The Air Force has also tested vortex surfing with C-17s using auto pilot in 2012, and indicated a 10% fuel saving. Tests in 2013 produced even greater fuel savings.

== Vortex surfing in nature ==
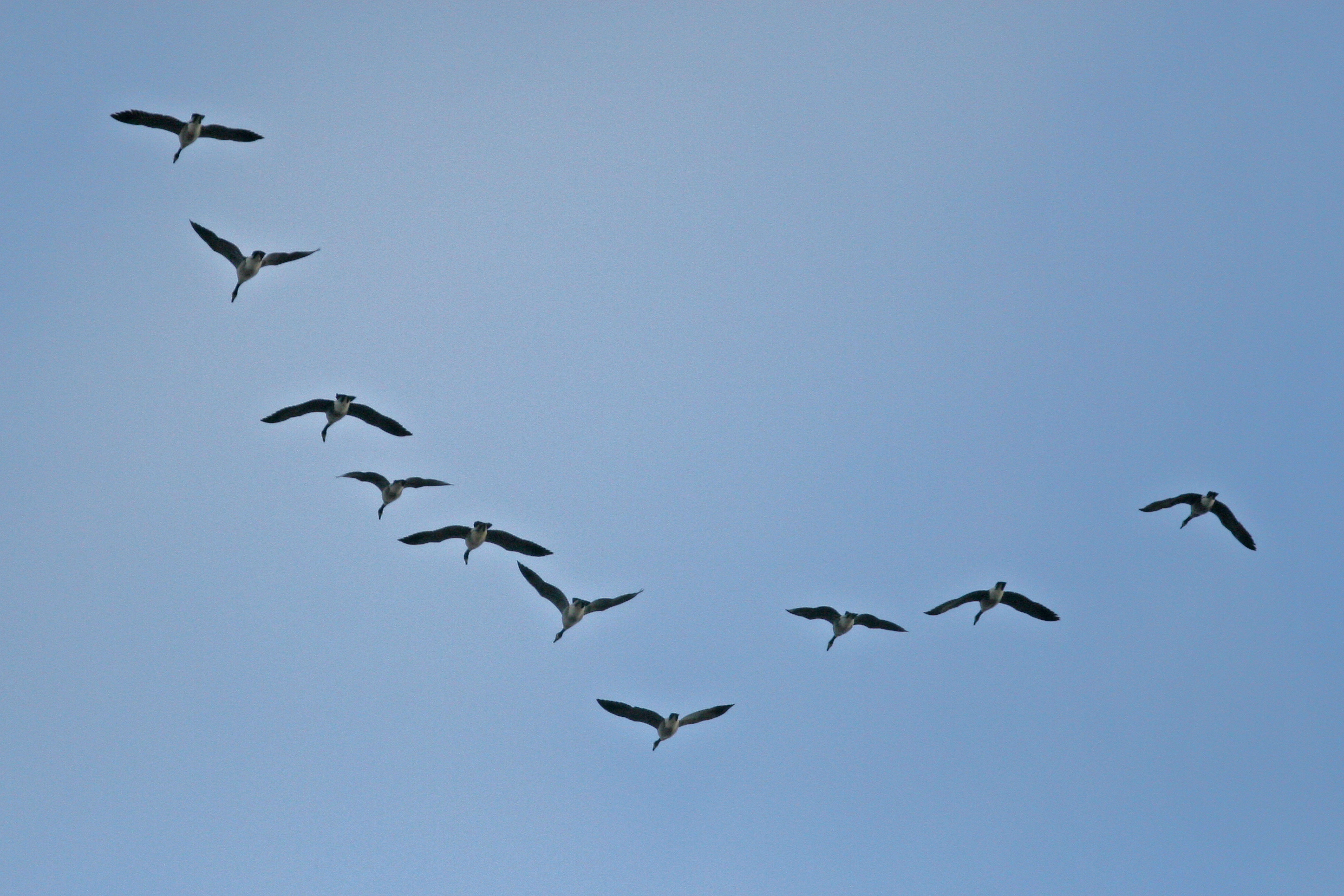
Canada geese flying in a V formation

Cooperative fluid dynamics techniques like drafting are also found in nature. Flocks of geese and some other birds fly in a V formation because the wingtip vortices generated by the front bird will create up-wash circulations. The birds flying behind will receive lift force from these up-wash vortices. Thus other birds in the flock do not need to work as hard to achieve lift. Studies show that birds in a V formation place themselves roughly at the optimum distance predicted by simple aerodynamic theory.
