= Ground effect (aerodynamics) =

Increased aircraft lift generated when close to fixed surface

In aircraft, the ground effect is the reduced aerodynamic drag that an aircraft's wings generate when they are close to a surface (land or water).

The principal benefit of operating in ground effect is to reduce its lift-induced drag. The closer the wing operates to a surface such as the ground ("in ground effect"), the less drag it experiences. When an aircraft enters ground effect, the surface pushes back against the downwash, which reduces its drag.

During takeoff, ground effect can cause an aircraft to "float" while accelerating towards the climb speed, reducing friction.

== Vehicle type ==
For rotorcraft, ground effect reduces drag on the rotor near the ground. At high weights this may allow lift off while stationary in ground effect, but not allow transition to flight while in ground effect. Helicopter pilots are provided with performance charts that show the limits for hovering in ground effect (IGE) and out of ground effect (OGE). The charts show the added lift produced.

For fan and jet-powered vertical take-off and landing (VTOL) aircraft, ground effect can cause suckdown and fountain lift on the airframe and loss in hovering thrust under hot gas ingestion (HGI) when the engine sucks in its own exhaust gas.

=== Fixed-wing aircraft ===
When an aircraft flies at or below approximately half the length of the aircraft's wingspan above the ground, ground effect is often-noticeable. This is caused primarily by the ground obstructing the creation of wingtip vortices, reducing downwash behind the wing as well as upwash in front of the wing. The nearer the wing is to the ground, the more pronounced the effect. In ground effect, the wing requires a lower angle of attack to produce the same amount of lift. In wind tunnel tests, in which the angle of attack and airspeed remain constant, an increase in the lift coefficient ensues, which combined with the reduced drag accounts for the "floating" effect.

Low winged aircraft are more affected by ground effect than high wing aircraft. Due to the change in up-wash, down-wash, and wingtip vortices, the airspeed system may make errors due to changes in local pressure at the static source.

=== Rotorcraft ===
When a hovering rotor is near the ground the downward flow of air through the rotor falls to zero at the ground. This condition is transferred to the disc through pressure changes in the wake which decreases the inflow to the rotor for a given disc loading (rotor thrust for each square foot of its area). This gives a thrust increase for a particular blade pitch angle, or, alternatively, the power required for a given thrust is reduced. For an overloaded helicopter that can hover only IGE it may be possible to climb away from the ground by translating to forward flight while in ground effect. The ground-effect benefit disappears rapidly with speed, while the induced power decreases rapidly to allow climbing. Some early underpowered helicopters could hover only close to the ground. Ground effect is at its maximum over a firm, smooth surface.

=== VTOL aircraft ===
The two effects inherent to VTOL aircraft operating at zero and low speeds in ground effect: suckdown and fountain lift. A third, hot gas ingestion, may apply to fixed-wing aircraft on the ground in windy conditions or during thrust reverser operation. How well, in terms of weight lifted, a VTOL aircraft hovering IGE depends on suckdown on the air frame, fountain impingement on the underside of the fuselage and HGI into the engine causing inlet temperature rise (ITR). Suckdown works against the engine lift as a downward force on the airframe. Fountain flow works with the engine lift jets as an upwards force. The severity of the HGI problem worsens when the level of ITR is converted into engine thrust loss, three to four percent per 12.2 °C ITR.

Suckdown is the result of entrainment of air around aircraft by lift jets when hovering. It also occurs in free air (OGE) causing loss of lift by reducing pressures on the underside of the fuselage and wings. Enhanced entrainment occurs when close to the ground giving higher lift loss. Fountain lift occurs when an aircraft has two or more lift jets. The jets strike the ground and spread out. Where they meet under the fuselage they mix and can only move upwards striking the underside of the fuselage. How well their upward momentum is diverted sideways or downward determines the lift. Fountain flow follows a curved fuselage underbody and retains some momentum in an upward direction so less than full fountain lift is captured unless lift improvement devices are fitted. HGI reduces engine thrust because the air entering the engine is hotter and less dense than cold air.

VTOL experimental aircraft operated from open grids to channel away the engine exhaust and prevent thrust loss from HGI.

The Bell X-14, built for early VTOL research, was unable to hover until suckdown effects were reduced by raising the aircraft with longer landing gear legs. It had to operate from an elevated platform of perforated steel to reduce HGI. The Dassault Mirage IIIV VTOL research aircraft only ever operated vertically from a grid that allowed engine exhaust to be channeled away from the aircraft to avoid suckdown and HGI effects.

Ventral strakes retroactively fitted to the P.1127 improved flow and increased pressure under the belly in low altitude hovering. Gun pods fitted in the same position on the production Harrier GR.1/GR.3 and the AV-8A Harrier did the same thing. Further lift improvement devices (LIDS) were developed for AV-8B and Harrier II. To box in the belly region where the lift-enhancing fountains strike the aircraft, strakes were added to the underside of the gun pods and a hinged dam could be lowered to block the gap between the front ends of the strakes. This gave a 1200 lb lift gain.

Lockheed Martin F-35 Lightning II weapons-bay inboard doors on the F-35B open to capture fountain flow created by the engine and fan lift jets and counter suckdown IGE.

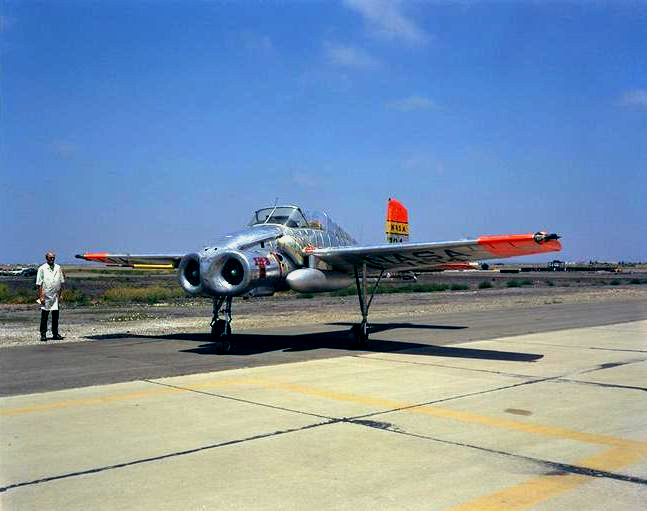
Bell X-14 showing lengthened landing gear legs to reduce suckdown

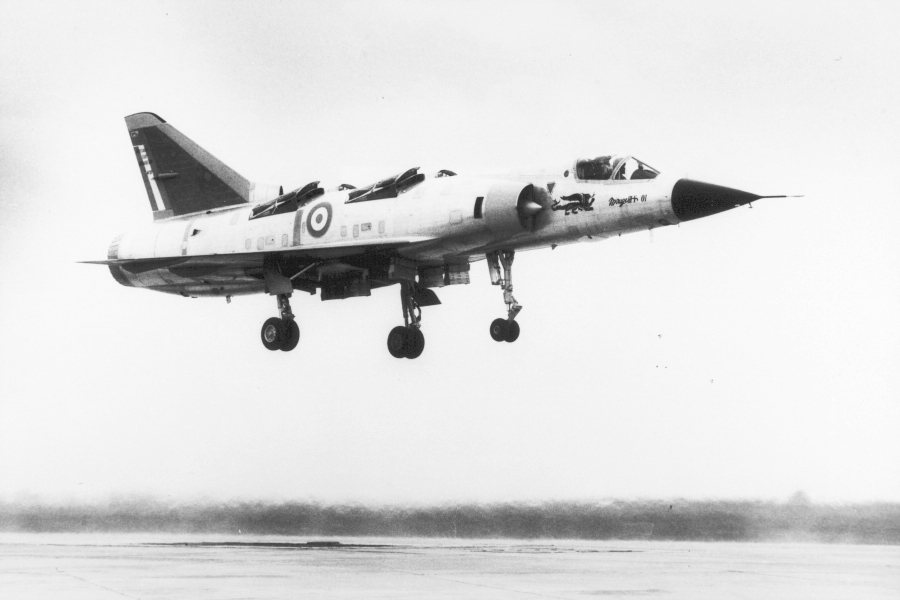
Dassault Mirage IIIV hovering over open grid

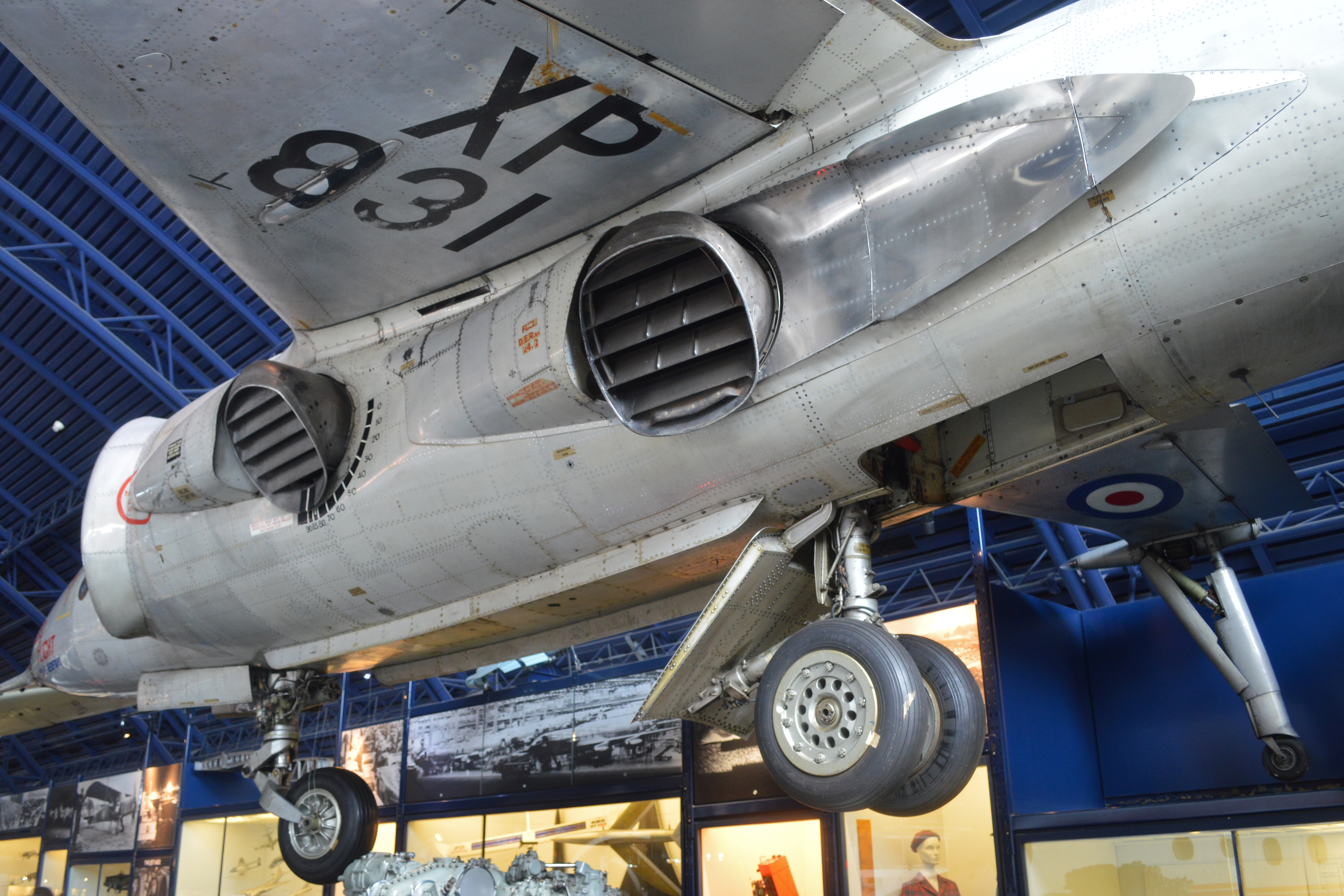
Underside view of the first prototype P.1127 showing small ventral strakes to increase fountain lift

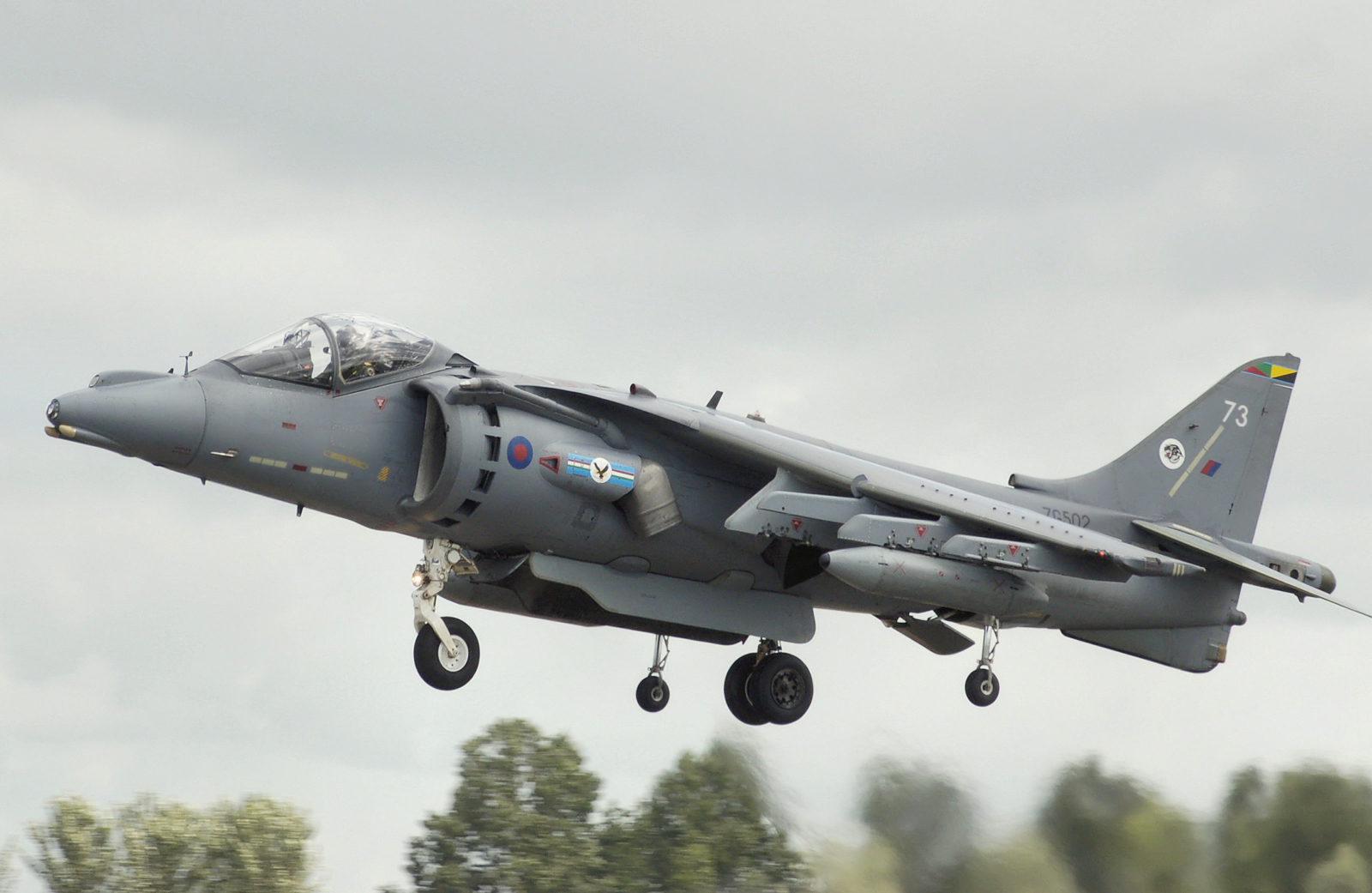
Harrier GR9 showing the lift improvement devices, large ventral strakes and a retractable dam behind nosewheel

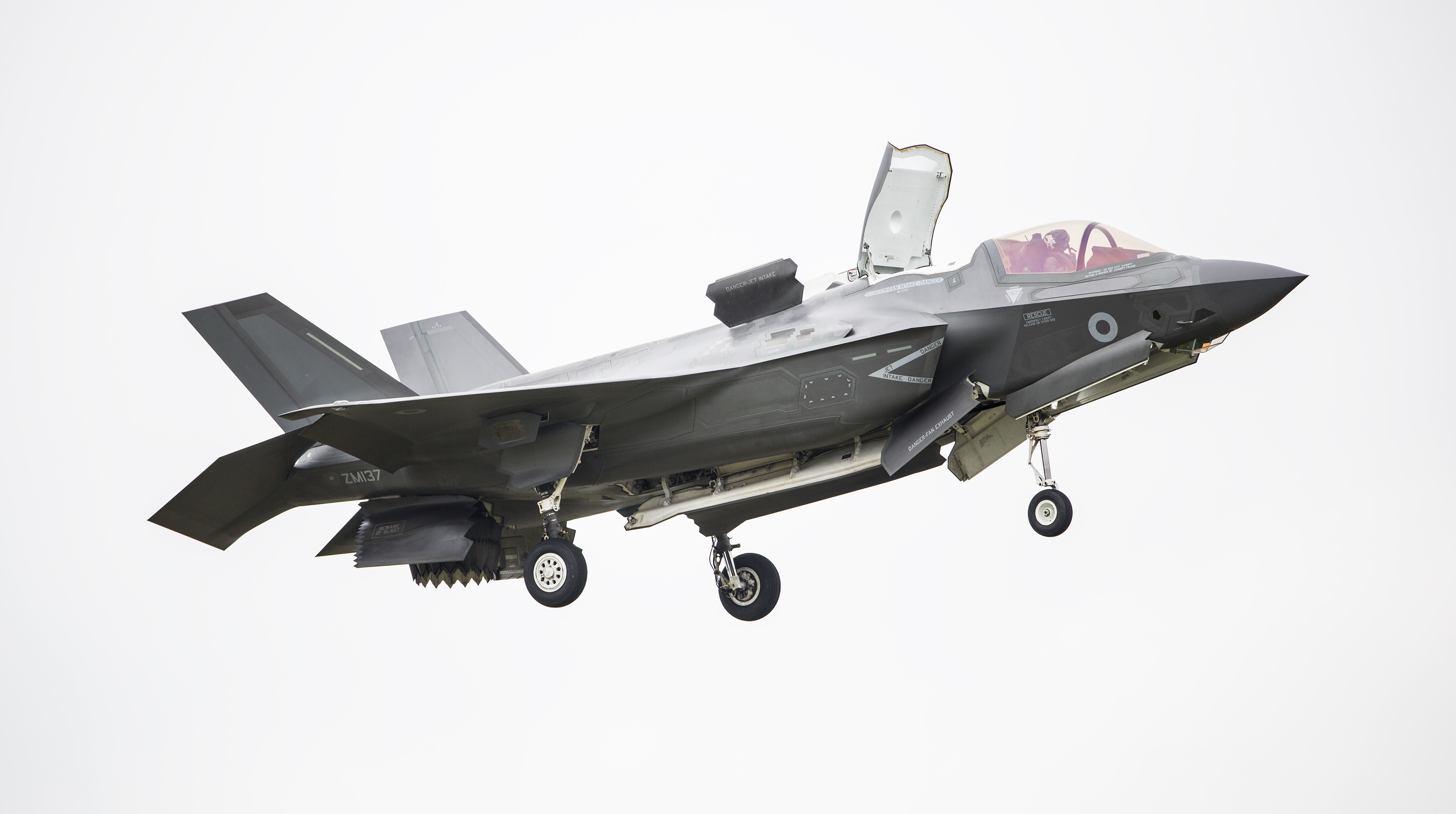
F-35B showing weapon's bay inboard doors open to capture rising fountain flow

=== Wing stall in ground effect ===
The stalling angle of attack is less in ground effect, by approximately 2–4 degrees, than in free air. Flow separation causes a large increase in drag. If the aircraft overrotates on take-off at too low a speed, the increased drag can prevent take-off. In 1952, two de Havilland Comets overran the end of the runway after overrotating. Loss of control may occur if one wing tip stalls in ground effect. During certification testing of the Gulfstream G650 business jet, the test aircraft rotated to an angle beyond the predicted IGE stalling angle. The over-rotation caused one wing-tip to stall and an uncommanded roll overpowered the lateral controls, leading to loss of the aircraft.

== Ground-effect vehicle ==
A few vehicles have been designed to explore the performance advantages of flying in ground effect, mainly over water. The operational disadvantages of flying close to the surface have discouraged widespread applications.

== See also ==
- Coandă effect
- Ground effect (cars)
- Hovercraft
- Vortex ring
