= Day A Special =

1930s touring biplane

A Special
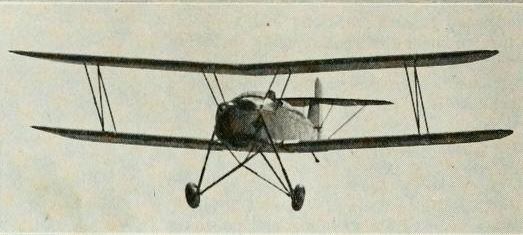
- Day biplane

General information
- Type: Two seat tourer
- National origin: United States
- Designer: Charles Healy Day
- Number built: 1

History
- First flight: 1931

The Day A Special, named Errant,was designed in the U.S. by Charles Healey Day, as a safe, easy to fly tourer, for two sitting side-by-side. In 1931 the designer and his wife flew Errant on a seven month world tour.

== Design and development ==
The 'A Special' was designed to meet the needs and abilities of a competent, non-professional pilot wanting a safe and forgiving two seat tourer, rather than a multi-role aircraft capable of aerobatics. As part of the early design process Day had studied the flight characteristics that underlay many light plane accidents in order to minimize them.

The result was an equal span biplane with generous wing area and large (54 in (1,400 mm)) stagger. The stagger allowed the side-by-side seats to be ahead of the lower wing leading edge, giving good fields of view both downwards and in steeply banked turns. Both upper and lower wings were set with 3° of dihedral and were rectangular in plan out to rounded tips. They were braced together with a forward-leaning N-strut on each side and the upper wing centre section was held over the fuselage by pairs of outward-leaning, parallel cabane struts. Flight tests showed its ailerons, inset and mounted only on the lower wing, retained control in the stall.

Its fuselage was flat-sided apart from rounded decking. A nose-mounted Martin 333 inverted, air-cooled inline engine producing 120 hp (89 kW) was gravity fed from a 24 US gal (20 imp gal; 91 L) tank under the front cowling. It had an open, side-by-side cockpit, well-instrumented with controls on the left and a 5 cu ft (0.14 m^{3}) baggage compartment behind it. The biplane had a large, 11 ft (3.4 m) span tailplane, adjustable for trim from the cockpit and carrying large elevators mounted well above the thrust line on top of a trapezoidal fin and out of the downwash of the lower wing, thus avoiding tail stalls. It had a large balanced rudder. Tests showed that compass headings could be maintained under blind flying conditions without use of the rudder; Day's accident analysis showed that rudder misuse was a frequent cause of accidents initiated in these conditions.

Landing safety was maximized by fixed landing gear with an 8 ft (2.4 m) track. Its wheels, well ahead of the centre of gravity were on landing legs with long travel shock absorbers from the upper fuselage longerons. They had low pressure tyres and brakes. The gear was a split axle type with the inner ends of the axles on a transverse V-strut from the lower longerons. This V-strut and the two drag struts from the outer axle ends were mounted on the central fuselage underside.

== The world tour ==
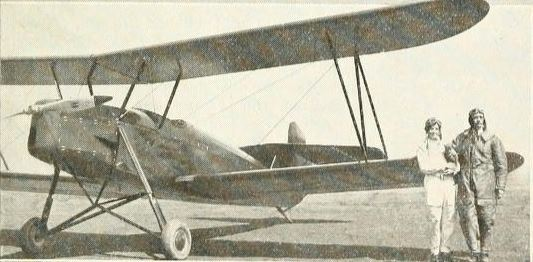
Before the tour

Charles Day's original suggestion was that he and his wife Gladys should use it for a tour around the United States but she preferred to see more and a world tour was planned instead. There were a few modifications to the biplane: a 24 US gal (20 imp gal; 91 L) reserve fuel tank was installed under the luggage space behind the seats, the oil tank increased in capacity and a second baggage space provided behind the engine firewall.

The aircraft was shipped to Heston Aerodrome near London in the summer of 1931. The couple packed some spares, fitted a new compass and set off through Central Europe, the Balkans, Asia Minor and East Asia to Shanghai. After shipping the biplane to San Francisco they flew home to New York. The trip took seven months, visited 74 cities and 20 countries; the overall flown distance was about 16,000 mi (26,000 km; 14,000 nmi).

== Specifications (A Special) ==
Data from Aero Digest, February 1932

General characteristics

- Crew: two
- Length: 24 ft 9 in (7.54 m)
- Wingspan: 34 ft (10 m)
- Wing area: 275 sq ft (25.5 m^{2})
- Airfoil: Göttingen 593
- Empty weight: 1,300 lb (590 kg)
- Gross weight: 2,000 lb (907 kg)
- Fuel capacity: originally 24 US gal (20 imp gal; 91 L), doubled for the world tour.
- Powerplant: 1 × Martin 333 inverted, air-cooled inline, 120 hp (89 kW) at 2100 rpm
- Propellers: 2-bladed, 8 ft (2.4 m) diameter

Performance

- Maximum speed: 105 mph (169 km/h, 91 kn)
- Cruise speed: 85 mph (137 km/h, 74 kn)
