= Slipstream =

Fluid dynamics phenomenon

Seed dispersal by the slipstream of a passing car

A slipstream is a region behind a moving object in which a wake of fluid (typically air or water) is moving at velocities comparable to that of the moving object, relative to the ambient fluid through which the object is moving. The term slipstream also applies to the similar region adjacent to an object with a fluid moving around it. Slipstreaming, or drafting, works because of the relative motion of the fluid in the slipstream.

== Overview ==
A slipstream created by turbulent flow has a slightly lower pressure than the ambient fluid around the object. When the flow is laminar, the pressure behind the object is higher than the surrounding fluid. The shape of an object determines how strong the effect is. In general, the more aerodynamic an object is, the smaller and weaker its slipstream will be. For example, a box-like front (relative to the object's motion) will collide with the medium's particles at a high rate, transferring more momentum from the object to the fluid than a more aerodynamic object. A bullet-like profile will cause less turbulence and create a more laminar flow.

A tapered rear will permit the particles of the medium to rejoin more easily and quickly than a truncated rear. This reduces lower-pressure effect in the slipstream, but also increases skin friction (in engineering designs, these effects must be balanced).

== Slipstreaming ==
The term "slipstreaming" describes an object travelling inside the slipstream of another object (most often objects moving through the air though not necessarily flying). If an object is following another object, moving at the same speed, the rear object will require less power to maintain its speed than if it were moving independently. This technique, also called drafting, can be used by bicyclists.

- Following in the slipstream of another motor vehicle, or "drafting", allows for significantly improved fuel efficiency due to reduced atmospheric drag. Truck convoys are a common example, travelling on highways in a single-file queue several vehicles long. Tests of electronically coupled truck convoys have demonstrated significant fuel savings. Computational studies of two aligned vehicle models have also examined how the aerodynamic drag on both vehicles varies with the spacing between them. Auto racing drivers also use drafting to conserve fuel or attain a higher speed before attempting to overtake another driver. Auto racing drivers also draft in order to conserve fuel, the better to gain competitive advantage by reducing the frequency of fuel stops or, more often, to reach a higher speed before pulling out to attempt to overtake another driver for example, a driver tries to overtake the leading driver so he follows the rear of the leading driver, the rear driver will gain slipstream causing the whole vehicle to gain more speed than the leading driver.
- A related effect used for lift rather than drag reduction is vortex surfing for airborne objects. The extended formations (V formation) or "skeins" in which many migratory birds (especially geese) fly enable the birds (except, of course, the bird at the front) to use vortex surfing to take advantage of one another's vortices. Other birds (for example cormorants) that typically fly in close formation, even on short journeys, are probably also exploiting this effect. Using wingtip devices to reduce induced drag caused by wingtip vortices has been tested for aircraft, and could save 10%–29% fuel.

== Spiral slipstream ==
Spiral slipstream, also known as propwash, prop wash, or spiraling slipstream, is a spiral-shaped slipstream formed behind a rotating propeller on an aircraft. The most noticeable effect resulting from the formation of a spiral slipstream is the tendency to yaw nose-left at low speed and full throttle (in centerline tractor aircraft with a clockwise-rotating propeller). This effect is caused by the slipstream acting upon the tail fin of the aircraft: The slipstream causes the air to rotate around the longitudinal axis of the aircraft, and this air flow exerts a force on the tail fin, pushing it to the right. To counteract this, some aircraft have the front of the fin (vertical stabilizer) slightly offset from the centerline so as to provide an opposing force that cancels out the one produced by the slipstream, albeit only at one particular (usually cruising) speed, an example being the Hawker Hurricane fighter from World War II.

Propeller slipstream causes increased lift by increasing the airspeed over part of the wings. It also reduces the stall speed of the aircraft by energizing the flow over the wings.

== See also ==
- Drafting or slipstreaming as used in sports such as cycling and motor racing
- Peloton
