= Crow instability =

Meteorological phenomenon

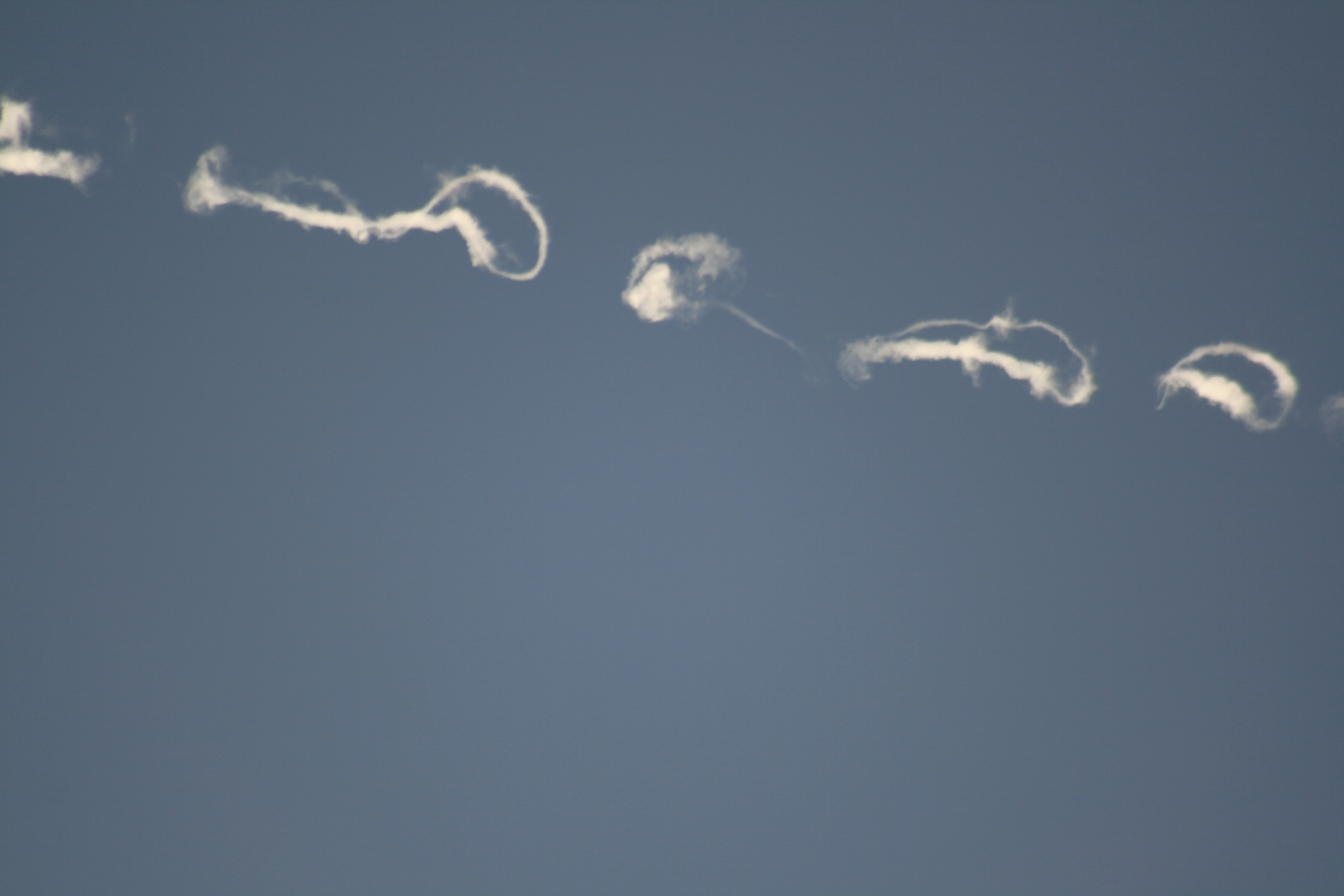
The Crow instability is responsible for the shape of this contrail

In aerodynamics, the Crow instability, or V.C.I. vortex crow instability, is an inviscid line-vortex instability, named after its discoverer S. C. Crow. The effect of the Crow instability can often be observed in the skies behind large aircraft, when the wingtip vortices interact with contrails from the engines, producing visible distortions in the shape of the contrail.

== Instability development ==
The Crow instability is a vortex pair instability, and typically goes through several stages:

- A pair of counter rotating vortices act upon each other to amplify small sinusoidal distortions in their vortex shapes (normally created by some initial disturbance in the system).
- The waves develop into either symmetric or anti-symmetric modes, depending on the nature of the initial disturbance.
- These distortions grow, both through interaction from one vortex on another, and also 'Self Induction' of a vortex with itself. This leads to an exponential growth in the vortex wave amplitude.
- The vortex amplitudes reach a critical value and reconnect, forming a chain of vortex rings.

== Aviation vortices ==
The wings of airplanes in flight produce at least one pair of trailing vortices. These vortices are a major source of wake turbulence as they persist for a significant period of time after the airplane has passed. If the decay of trailing vortices were due solely to viscous effects in the core of each vortex, decay would be so slow that they would persist for hundreds of miles behind the airplane. In fact, these vortices only persist for tens of miles. The additional cause of the collapse of these vortices is large-scale instabilities such as Crow instability.

== Bibliography ==
- Crow, S. C. (1970). "Stability theory for a pair of trailing vortices". AIAA Journal. 8 (12): 2172–2179. Bibcode:1970AIAAJ...8.2172C. doi:10.2514/3.6083.
- Saffman, P. G. (1992). Vortex Dynamics. Cambridge University Press. ISBN 978-0-521-47739-0.
