= V formation =

Formation with units arranged in a chevron or "V" shape or two sides of a triangle

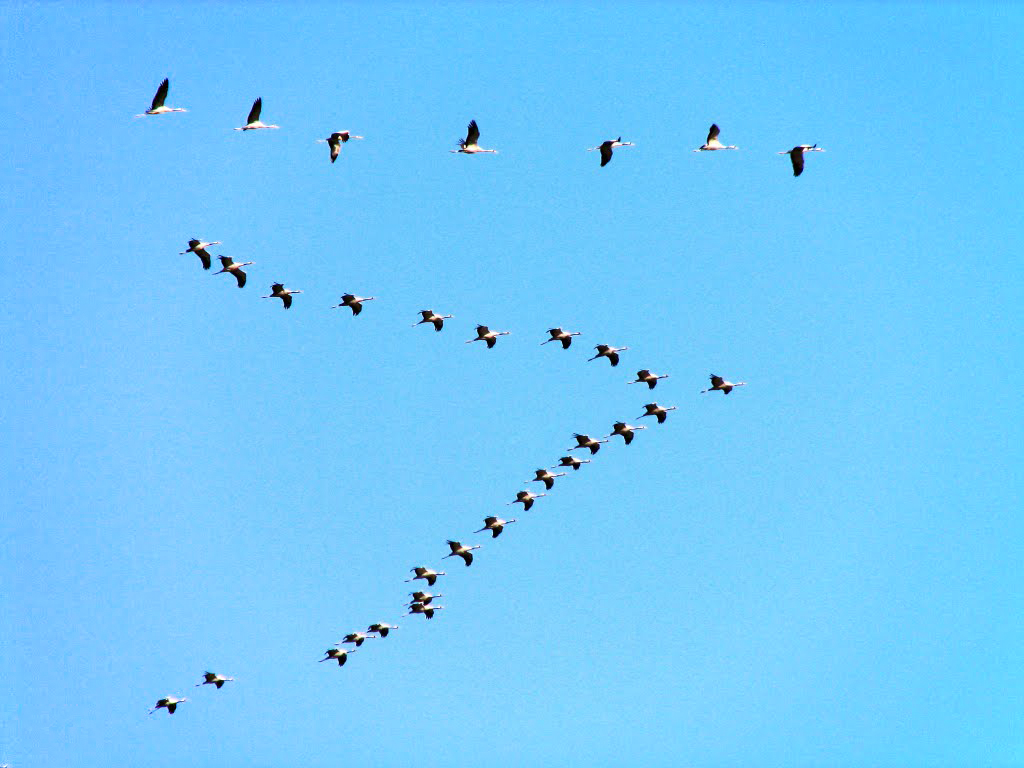
Eurasian cranes in a V formation

(video) Birds flying in V formation

A V formation is a symmetric V- or chevron-shaped (two sides of a triangle) flight formation. In nature, it occurs among geese, swans, ducks, and other migratory birds while in human aviation it is used mostly in military aviation, air shows, and occasionally commercial aviation.

Flying in the V formation is thought by some to improve energy efficiency. Others hypothesize that it is the formation that most reliably allows a flock of large birds to fly very close together without any member of the flock being disturbed by the vortices of a bird flying ahead, while at the same time having the most favorable conditions for the optical perceptions to maintain the flight formation. Usually, large birds fly in this formation. V formations are thought to improve the fuel efficiency of aircraft.

== Aerodynamics ==
The V formation possibly improves the efficiency of flying birds, particularly over long migratory routes. It is hypothesized that the birds after can take the upwash lift force due to the wingtip vortices at the tip of the wings of the lead bird. The upwash would assist each bird in supporting its own weight in flight, in the same way a glider can climb or maintain height indefinitely in rising air. The birds are said to be able to find the place where the uplift is the most desirable either by sight or by sensing the airflow by their feathers, scientists suspect.

According to a 1970 paper, in a V formation of 25 members, each bird can achieve a reduction of induced drag and as a result increase their range by 71% while flying at a 24% lower speed. In a 2001 Nature study, researchers used trackers on pelicans, trained to fly behind a motor boat. They found that pelicans flying alone had higher heart rate and flapped their wings more frequently compared to those flying at the same speed in V formation.

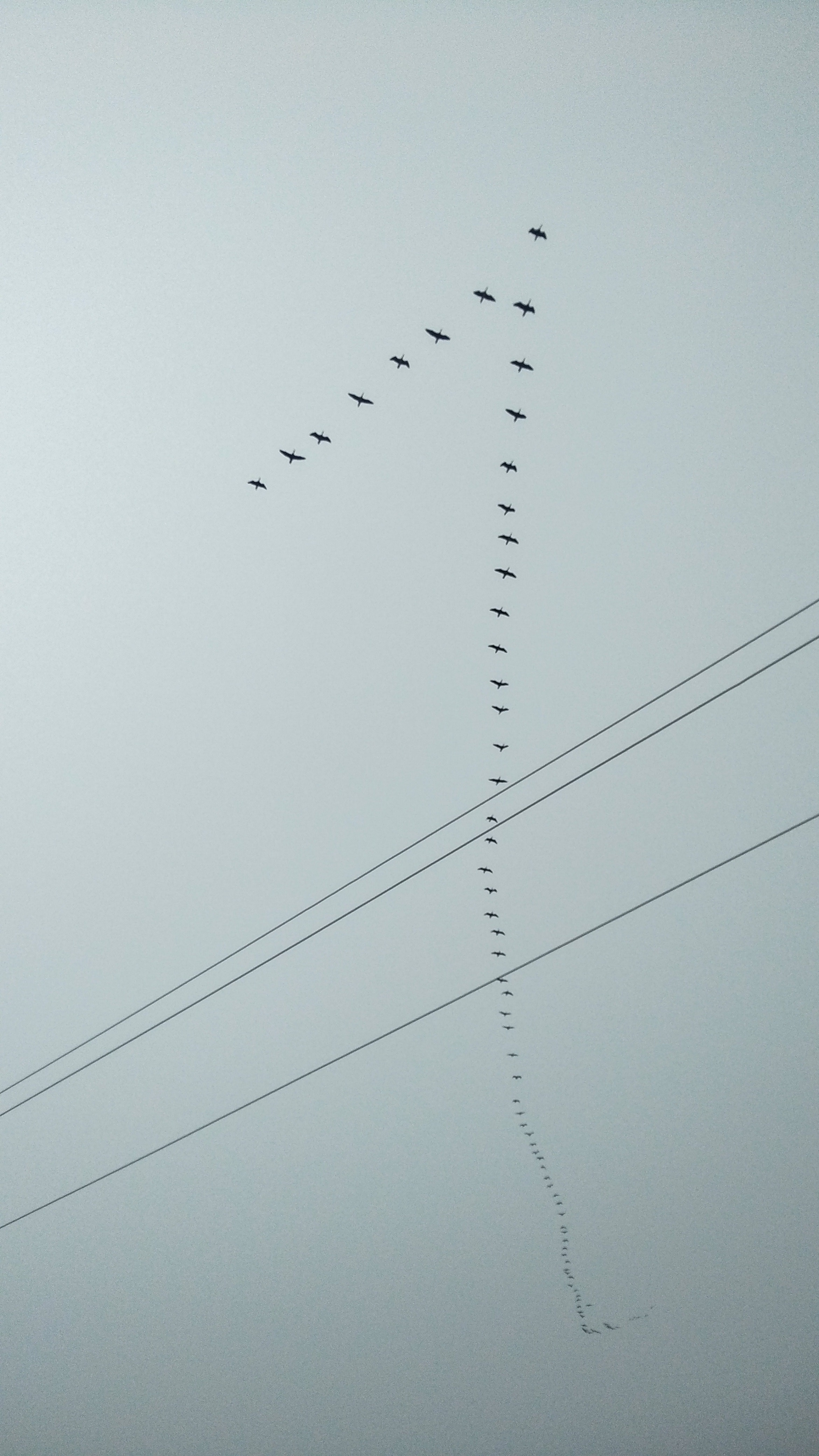
Migratory birds in V formation

== Flight characteristics ==
In a group of ibises, some birds preferred to fly at the left, some at the right, and some at the center. The flight formation ranges around a V-like shape and does not stay constant. Geese, ducks and swans commonly form a skein in V formation.

Flying in V formation is not only about position but also about the timing of flapping. The birds behind will sync with the flapping pattern of the leading bird to follow the trail of upwash left by the bird at front. It is observed that a bird will reverse the flapping pattern when flying directly behind another, in order to avoid the downwash.

== Applications ==
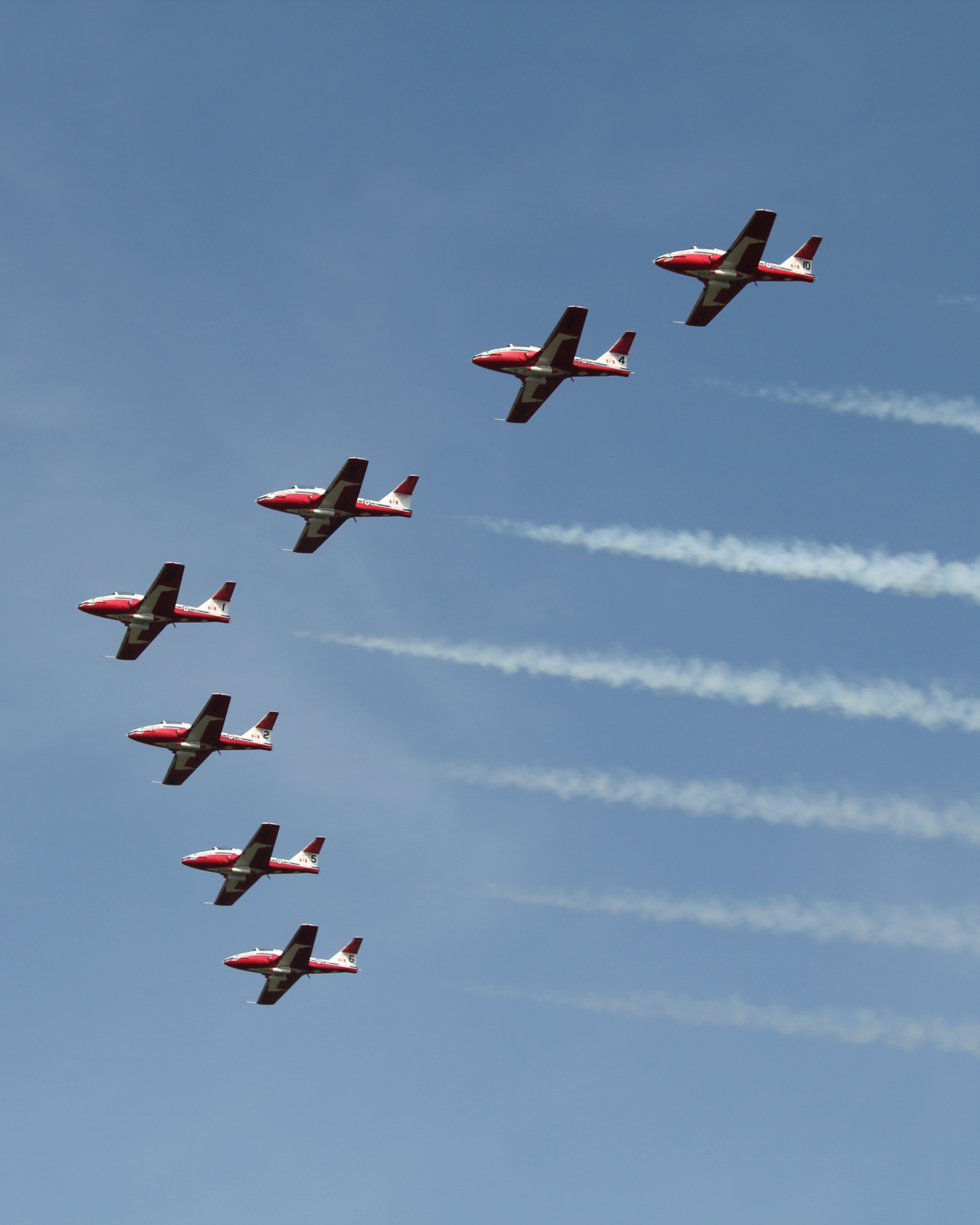
Royal Canadian Air Force Snowbirds flying in V formation at an air show

=== Military flight ===
The "V", or "Vic" formation is a basic flight formation for military aircraft in many air forces. The Vic formation is also common in ceremonial flyovers and airshow flights.

Similar aerodynamics advantage was attempted to be utilized by engineers and research pilots. The airflow from wingtips of the aircraft can provide upward lift force for the planes behind, providing more efficient flight. NASA’s Dryden Flight Research Center initiated the NASA Autonomous Formation Flight program, which involved a Formation Flight Instrumentation System that uses GPS to allow the aircraft to be position at precise formation location automatically. The goal of this program was to save a sustained 10 percent of fuel, and experimental data suggested that as high as 15 percent could be achieved. Such fuel reduction can also reduce the amount of pollution released into the environment.

Air Mobility Command, which accounts for 20 percent of all avionic fuel usage by the United States federal government, is also experimenting with autopilot changes to find the best tradeoff between the reduced drag of 'vortex surfing' and the resulting 'ride qualities' of flying through another aircraft's wake.

=== Commercial flight ===
Airbus has made efforts to reduce fuel consumption in commercial aviation through its fello’fly project, where two commercial aircraft fly in a V formation. Since large aircraft at high speed generate immense vortices at their wings, two aircraft will fly approximately 1.5 to 2 miles apart, near the smooth current of updraft. Thus, significant fuel can be saved without compromising passenger comfort.

Test flights were done using two AS350 Écureuil helicopters, and the results showed that 5 percent to 10 percent of fuel can be reduced for the second aircraft per trip. This percentage per flight means several tons of jet fuel and carbon dioxide emissions. Nevertheless, operational and financial concerns and savings between airlines need to be addressed, as well as the schedules of position and altitude data for planes with similar routes to fly together.

== Birds that fly in V formation ==
This list is not comprehensive as it does not cover all birds that fly in V formation.

- Geese
- Swans
- Gulls
- Cranes
- Pelicans
- Cormorants
- Ibises
- Ducks

== Past studies and findings ==
- Wieselsberger (1914): An aerodynamicist who was the first to suggest that a formation may give birds an aerodynamic advantage by exploiting the wingtip vortices. He proposed that birds flying in a V formation make use of the upwash of neighboring birds to reduce induced drag, and hence conserve energy in flight.
- Hamilton (1967): Posited that the staggered formation provides an advantage for visual communication with neighboring birds. At the same time, it also provides a clear viewing field during flight.
- Lissaman & Schollenberger (1970): Calculated a quantitative approximation of the energy saved. Through their study, they concluded that a formation of 25 birds can increase the birds' range by up to 71% as compared to just one bird, at the cost of a 24% lower speed and thus longer traveling times.
- Willis et al. (2007): Sought to examine the energy savings in flight with respect to positioning and wing beat phase relationships between two adjacent birds. The results showed that optimal flapping of each bird accounts for up to 20% energy savings.
