= Wingtip vortices =

Turbulence caused by difference in air pressure on either side of wing

Lift-induced vortices behind a jet aircraft are evidenced by smoke on a runway in an experiment by the German Aerospace Center (DLR)

An audio recording of lift-induced vortices heard shortly after an airliner flew over the recorder

Wingtip vortices are circular patterns of rotating air left behind a wing as it generates lift. The name is a misnomer because the cores of the vortices are slightly inboard of the wing tips. Wingtip vortices are sometimes named trailing or lift-induced vortices because they also occur at points other than at the wing tips. Indeed, vorticity is trailed at any point on the wing where the lift varies span-wise (a fact described and quantified by the lifting-line theory); it eventually rolls up into large vortices near the wingtip, at the edge of flap devices, or at other abrupt changes in wing planform.

Wingtip vortices are associated with induced drag, the imparting of downwash, and are a fundamental consequence of three-dimensional lift generation. Careful selection of wing geometry (in particular, wingspan), as well as of cruise conditions, are design and operational methods to minimize induced drag.

Wingtip vortices form the primary component of wake turbulence. Depending on ambient atmospheric humidity as well as the geometry and wing loading of aircraft, water may condense or freeze in the core of the vortices, making the vortices visible.

== Generation of trailing vortices ==
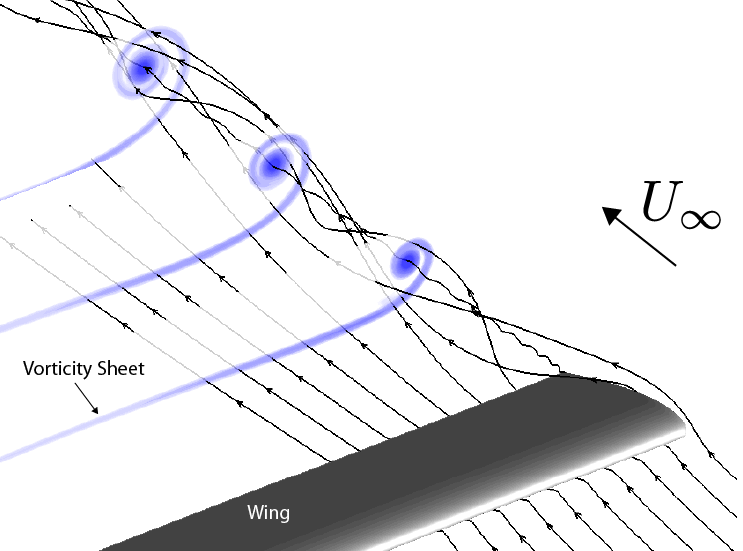
Euler computation of a tip vortex rolling up from the trailed vorticity sheet.

When a wing generates aerodynamic lift, it results in a region of downwash between the two vortices.

Three-dimensional lift and the occurrence of wingtip vortices can be approached with the concept of horseshoe vortex and described accurately with the Lanchester–Prandtl theory. In this view, the trailing vortex is a continuation of the wing-bound vortex inherent to the lift generation.

== Effects and mitigation ==
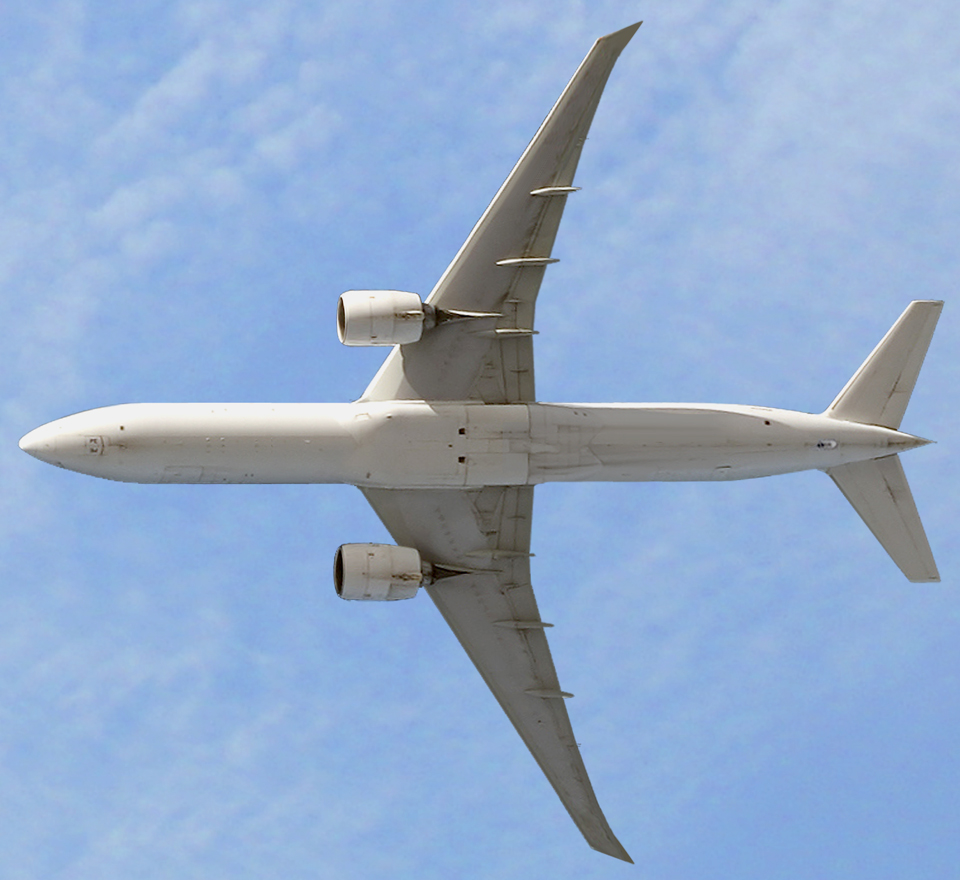
Modern airliners often feature slender wings and wingtip devices

Wingtip vortices are associated with induced drag, an unavoidable consequence of three-dimensional lift generation. The rotary motion of the air within the shed wingtip vortices (sometimes described as a "leakage") reduces the effective angle of attack of the air on the wing.

The lifting-line theory describes the shedding of trailing vortices as span-wise changes in lift distribution. For a given wing span and surface, minimal induced drag is obtained with an elliptical lift distribution. For a given lift distribution and wing planform area, induced drag is reduced with increasing aspect ratio.

As a consequence, aircraft for which a high lift-to-drag ratio is desirable, such as gliders or long-range airliners, typically have high aspect ratio wings. Such wings however have disadvantages with respect to structural constraints and maneuverability, as evidenced by combat and aerobatic planes which usually feature short, stubby wings despite the efficiency losses.

Another method of reducing induced drag is the use of winglets, as seen on most modern airliners. Winglets increase the effective aspect ratio of the wing, changing the pattern and magnitude of the vorticity in the vortex pattern. A reduction is achieved in the kinetic energy in the circular air flow, which reduces the amount of fuel expended to perform work upon the spinning air.

After NASA became concerned about the increasing density of air traffic potentially causing vortex related accidents at airports, an experiment by NASA Ames Research Center wind tunnel testing with a 747 model found that the configuration of the flaps could be changed on existing aircraft to break the vortex into three smaller and less disturbing vortexes. This primarily involved changing the settings of the outboard flaps, and could theoretically be retrofitted to existing aircraft.

== Visibility of vortices ==
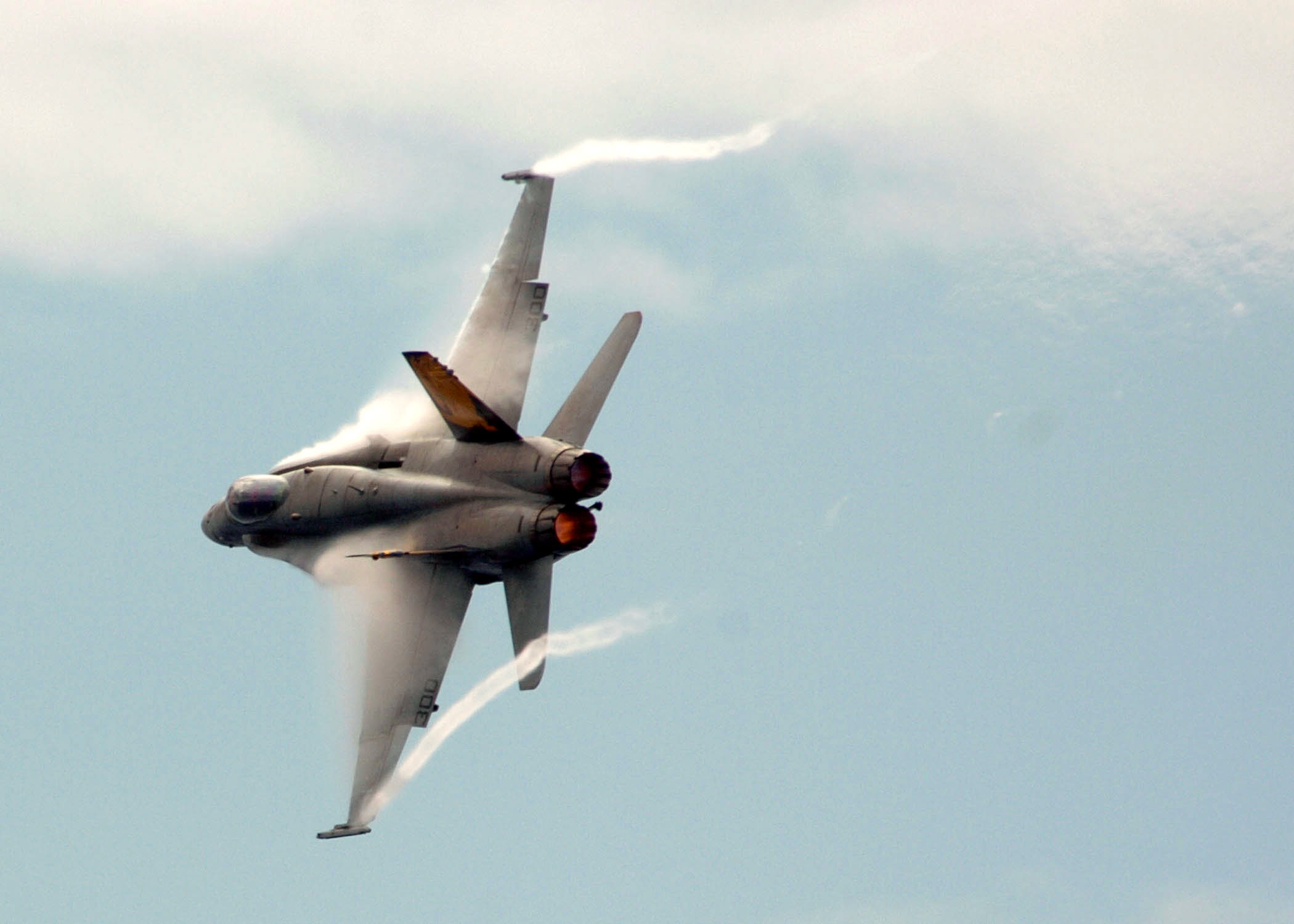
Vortices shed at the tips and from the leading-edge extensions of an F/A-18

The cores of the vortices can sometimes be visible when the water present in them condenses from gas (vapor) to liquid. This water can sometimes even freeze, forming ice particles.

Condensation of water vapor in wing tip vortices is most common on aircraft flying at high angles of attack, such as fighter aircraft in high g maneuvers, or airliners taking off and landing on humid days.

=== Aerodynamic condensation and freezing ===
The cores of vortices spin at very high speed and are regions of very low pressure. To first approximation, these low-pressure regions form with little exchange of heat with the neighboring regions (i.e., adiabatically), so the local temperature in the low-pressure regions drops, too. If it drops below the local dew point, there results a condensation of water vapor present in the cores of wingtip vortices, making them visible. The temperature may even drop below the local freezing point, in which case ice crystals will form inside the cores.

The phase of water (i.e., whether it assumes the form of a solid, liquid, or gas) is determined by its temperature and pressure. For example, in the case of liquid-gas transition, at each pressure there is a special "transition temperature" $T_{c}$ such that if the sample temperature is even a little above $T_{c}$, the sample will be a gas, but, if the sample temperature is even a little below $T_{c}$, the sample will be a liquid; see phase transition. For example, at the standard atmospheric pressure, $T_{c}$ is 100 °C = 212 °F. The transition temperature $T_{c}$ decreases with decreasing pressure (which explains why water boils at lower temperatures at higher altitudes and at higher temperatures in a pressure cooker; see here for more information). In the case of water vapor in air, the $T_{c}$ corresponding to the partial pressure of water vapor is called the dew point. (The solid–liquid transition also happens around a specific transition temperature called the melting point. For most substances, the melting point also decreases with decreasing pressure, although water ice in particular - in its I_{h} form, which is the most familiar one - is a prominent exception to this rule.)

Vortex cores are regions of low pressure. As a vortex core begins to form, the water in the air (in the region that is about to become the core) is in vapor phase, which means that the local temperature is above the local dew point. After the vortex core forms, the pressure inside it has decreased from the ambient value, and so the local dew point ($T_{c}$) has dropped from the ambient value. Thus, in and of itself, a drop in pressure would tend to keep water in vapor form: The initial dew point was already below the ambient air temperature, and the formation of the vortex has made the local dew point even lower. However, as the vortex core forms, its pressure (and so its dew point) is not the only property that is dropping: The vortex-core temperature is dropping also, and in fact it can drop by much more than the dew point does.

To first approximation, the formation of vortex cores is thermodynamically an adiabatic process, i.e., one with no exchange of heat. In such a process, the drop in pressure is accompanied by a drop in temperature, according to the following equation of state:

$\frac{T_{\text{f}}}{T_{\text{i}}}=\left(\frac{p_{\text{f}}}{p_{\text{i}}}\right)^{\frac{\gamma -1}{\gamma}}.$

Here $T_{\text{i}}$ and $p_{\text{i}}$ are the absolute temperature and pressure at the beginning of the process (here equal to the ambient air temperature and pressure), $T_{\text{f}}$ and $p_{\text{f}}$ are the absolute temperature and pressure in the vortex core (which is the end result of the process), and the constant $\gamma$ is about 7/5 = 1.4 for air (see here).

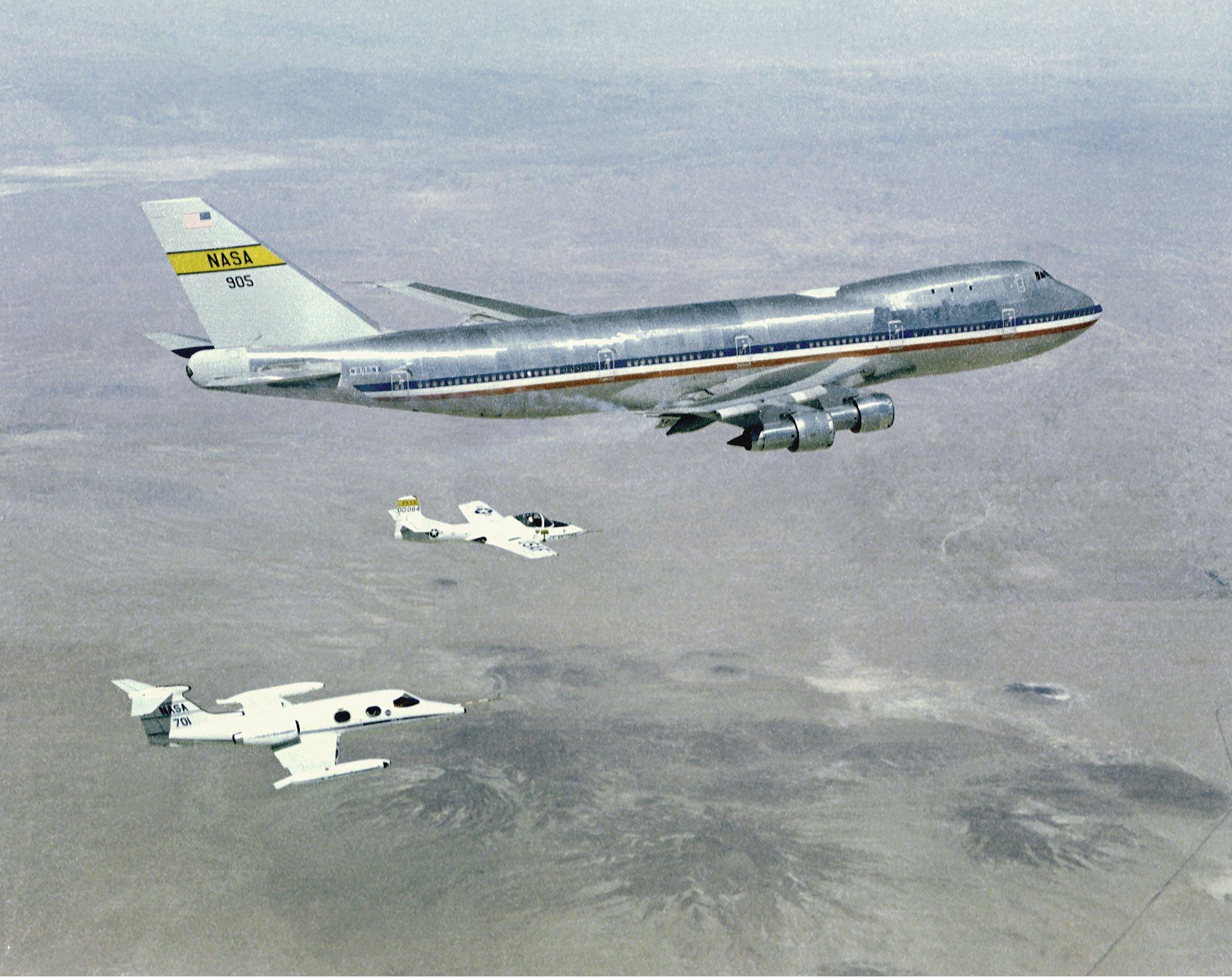
A NASA experiment to study wing vortexes in 1974, using a Boeing 747, Learjet 23 and a Cessna T-37 Tweet

Thus, even though the local dew point inside the vortex cores is even lower than in the ambient air, the water vapor may nevertheless condense — if the formation of the vortex brings the local temperature below the new local dew point.

For a typical transport aircraft landing at an airport, these conditions are as follows: $T_{\text{i}}$ and $p_{\text{i}}$ have values corresponding to the so-called standard conditions, i.e., $p_{\text{i}}$ = 1 atm = 1013.25 mb = 101$\,$325 Pa and $T_{\text{i}}$ = 293.15 K (which is 20 °C = 68 °F). The relative humidity is a comfortable 35% (dew point of 4.1 °C = 39.4 °F). This corresponds to a partial pressure of water vapor of 820 Pa = 8.2 mb. In a vortex core, the pressure ($p_{\text{f}}$) drops to about 80% of the ambient pressure, i.e., to about 80 000 Pa.

The temperature in the vortex core is given by the equation above as $T_{\text{f}}=\left(\frac{\scriptstyle 80\,000}{\scriptstyle 101\,325}\right)^{\scriptscriptstyle 0.4/1.4}\,T_{\text{i}}= 0.935\,\times\,293.15=274\;\text{K},$ or 0.86 °C = 33.5 °F.

Next, the partial pressure of water in the vortex core drops in proportion to the drop in the total pressure (i.e., by the same percentage), to about 650 Pa = 6.5 mb. According to a dew point calculator, that partial pressure results in the local dew point of about 0.86 °C; in other words, the new local dew point is about equal to the new local temperature.

Therefore, this is a marginal case; if the relative humidity of the ambient air were even a bit higher (with the total pressure and temperature remaining as above), then the local dew point inside the vortices would rise, while the local temperature would remain the same. Thus, the local temperature would now be lower than the local dew point, and so the water vapor inside the vortices would indeed condense. Under the right conditions, the local temperature in vortex cores may drop below the local freezing point, in which case ice particles will form inside the vortex cores.

The water-vapor condensation mechanism in wingtip vortices is thus driven by local changes in air pressure and temperature. This is to be contrasted to what happens in another well-known case of water condensation related to airplanes: the contrails from airplane engine exhausts. In the case of contrails, the local air pressure and temperature do not change significantly; what matters instead is that the exhaust contains both water vapor (which increases the local water-vapor concentration and so its partial pressure, resulting in elevated dew point and freezing point) as well as aerosols (which provide nucleation centers for the condensation and freezing).

== Formation flight ==
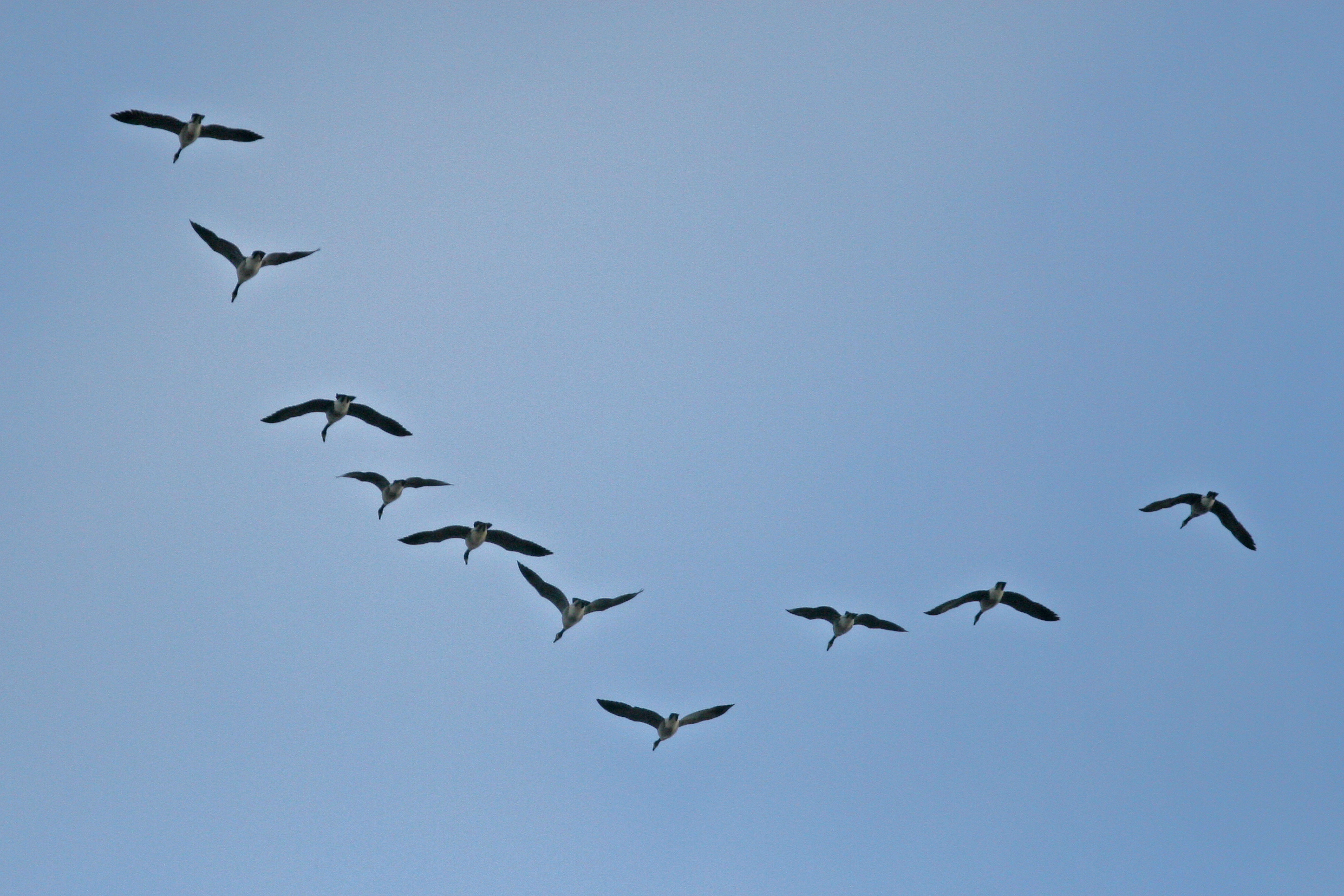
Canada geese in V formation

One theory on migrating bird flight states that many larger bird species fly in a V formation so that all but the leader bird can take advantage of the upwash part of the wingtip vortex of the bird ahead.

Albion Bowers, a NASA scientist ( ret. ), has stated on YouTube videos that they have the vortex form at 75% of halfspan, & they cross their wings ( bird ahead, bird behind ) at this point, showing exactly that they are taking advantage of this: each bird flies in the outboard-upwash of the bird ahead.

== Hazards ==
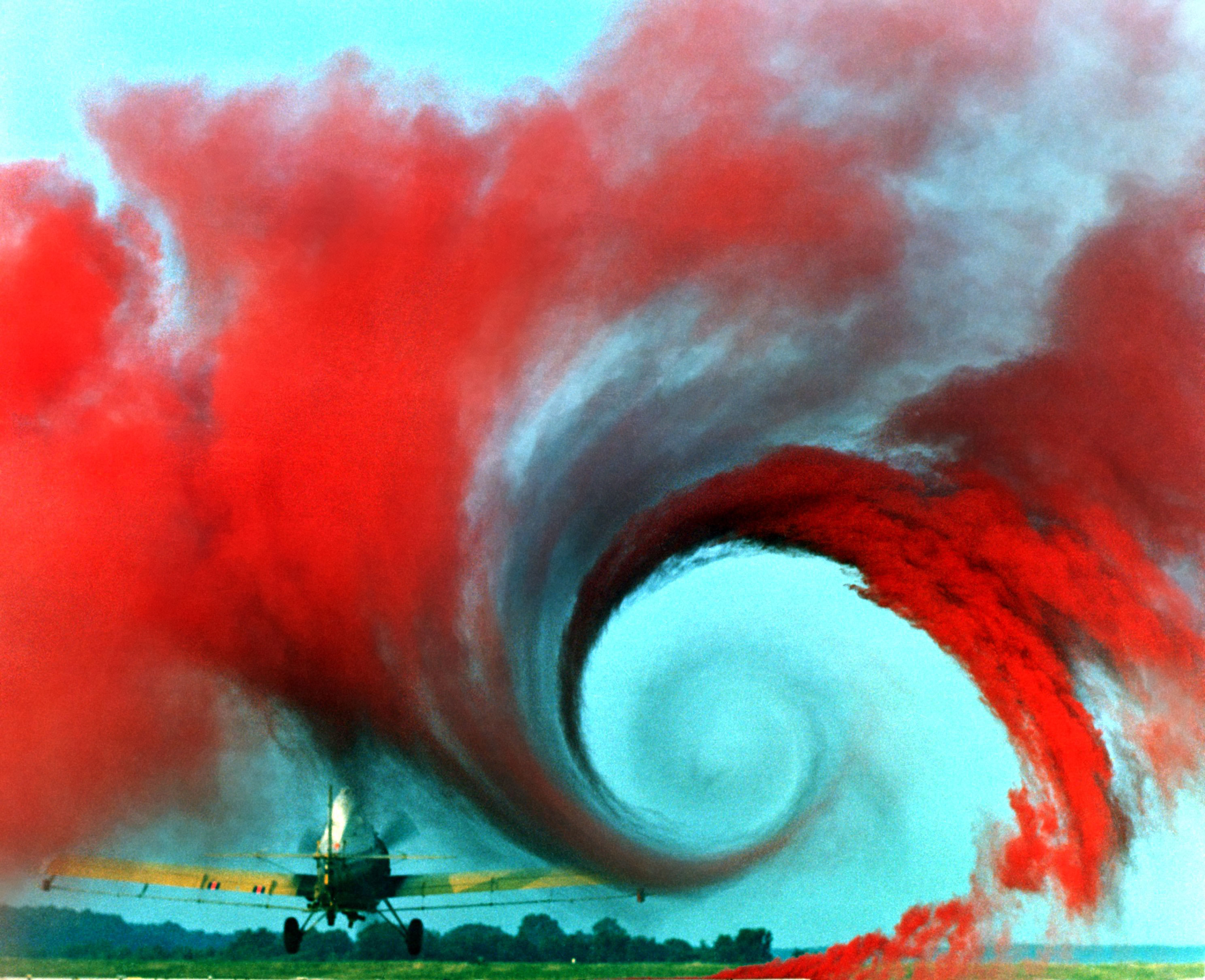
A NASA study on wingtip vortices, illustrating the size of the vortices produced.

Wingtip vortices can pose a hazard to aircraft, especially during the landing and takeoff phases of flight. The intensity or strength of the vortex is a function of aircraft size, speed, and configuration (flap setting, etc.). The strongest vortices are produced by heavy aircraft, flying slowly, with wing flaps and landing gear retracted ("heavy, slow and clean"). Large jet aircraft can generate vortices that can persist for many minutes, drifting with the wind.

The hazardous aspects of wingtip vortices are most often discussed in the context of wake turbulence. If a light aircraft immediately follows a heavy aircraft, wake turbulence from the heavy aircraft can roll the light aircraft faster than can be resisted by use of ailerons. At low altitudes, in particular during takeoff and landing, this can lead to an upset from which recovery is not possible. ("Light" and "heavy" are relative terms, and even smaller jets have been rolled by this effect.) Air traffic controllers attempt to ensure an adequate separation between departing and arriving aircraft by issuing wake turbulence warnings to pilots.

In general, to avoid vortices an aircraft is safer if its takeoff is before the rotation point of the airplane that took off before it. However care must be taken to stay upwind (or otherwise away) from any vortices that were generated by the previous aircraft. On landing behind an airplane the aircraft should stay above the earlier one's flight path and touch down further along the runway.

Glider pilots routinely practice flying in wingtip vortices when they do a maneuver called "boxing the wake". This involves descending from the higher to lower position behind a tow plane. This is followed by making a rectangular figure by holding the glider at high and low points away from the towing plane before coming back up through the vortices. (For safety this is not done below 1500 feet above the ground, and usually with an instructor present.) Given the relatively slow speeds and lightness of both aircraft the procedure is safe but does instill a sense of how strong and where the turbulence is located.

== Gallery ==
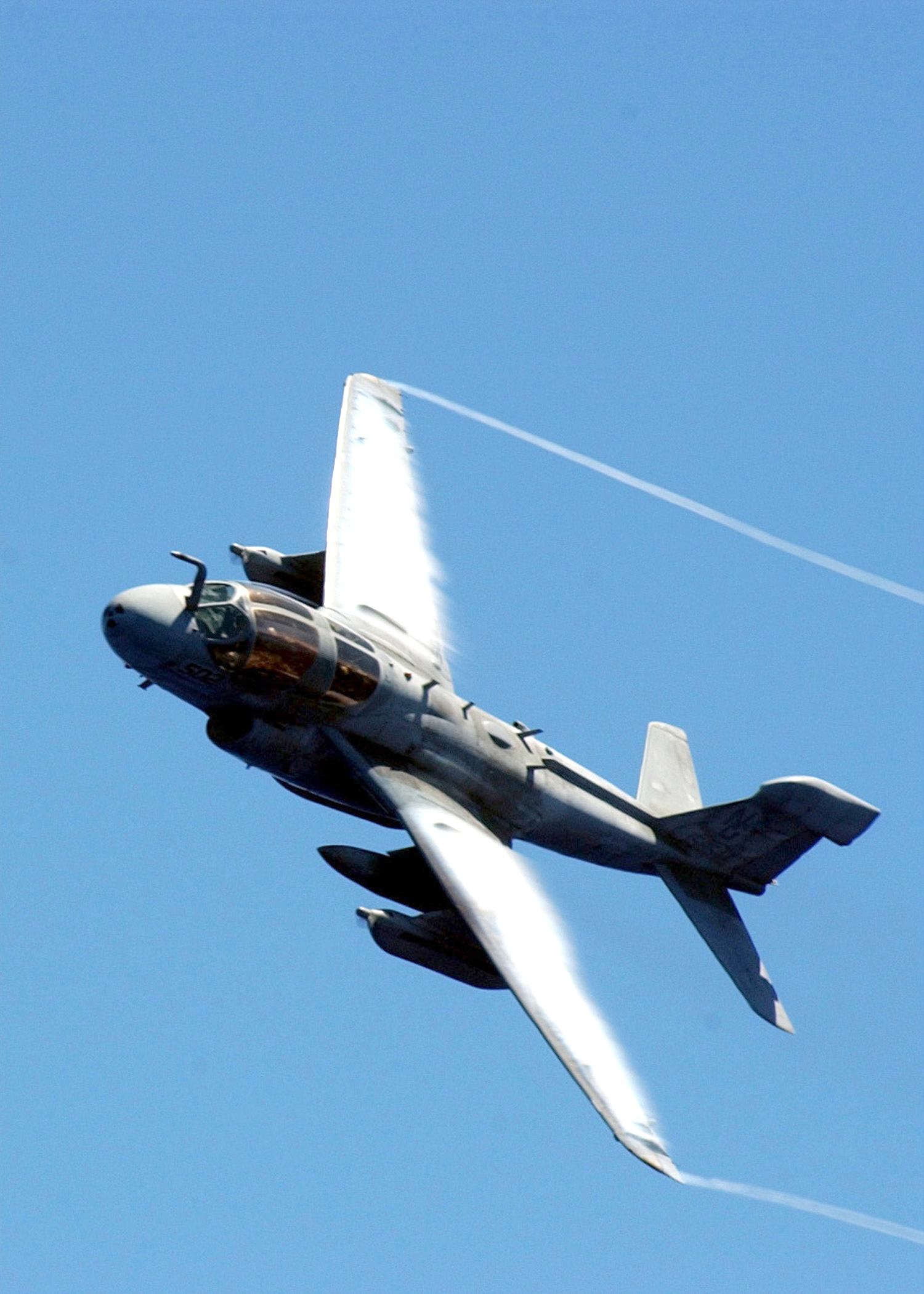
An EA-6 Prowler with condensation in the cores of its wingtip vortices and also on the top of its wings.

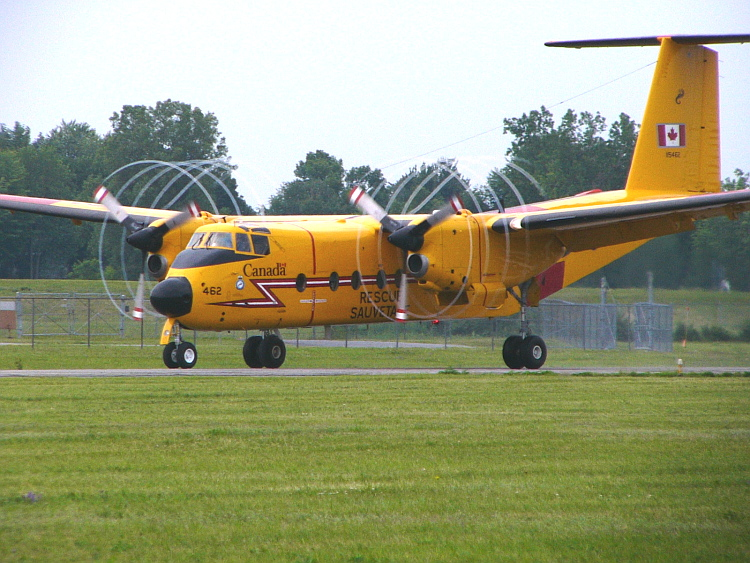
Vortices form at the ends of propeller blades, as seen on this DHC-5 Buffalo.

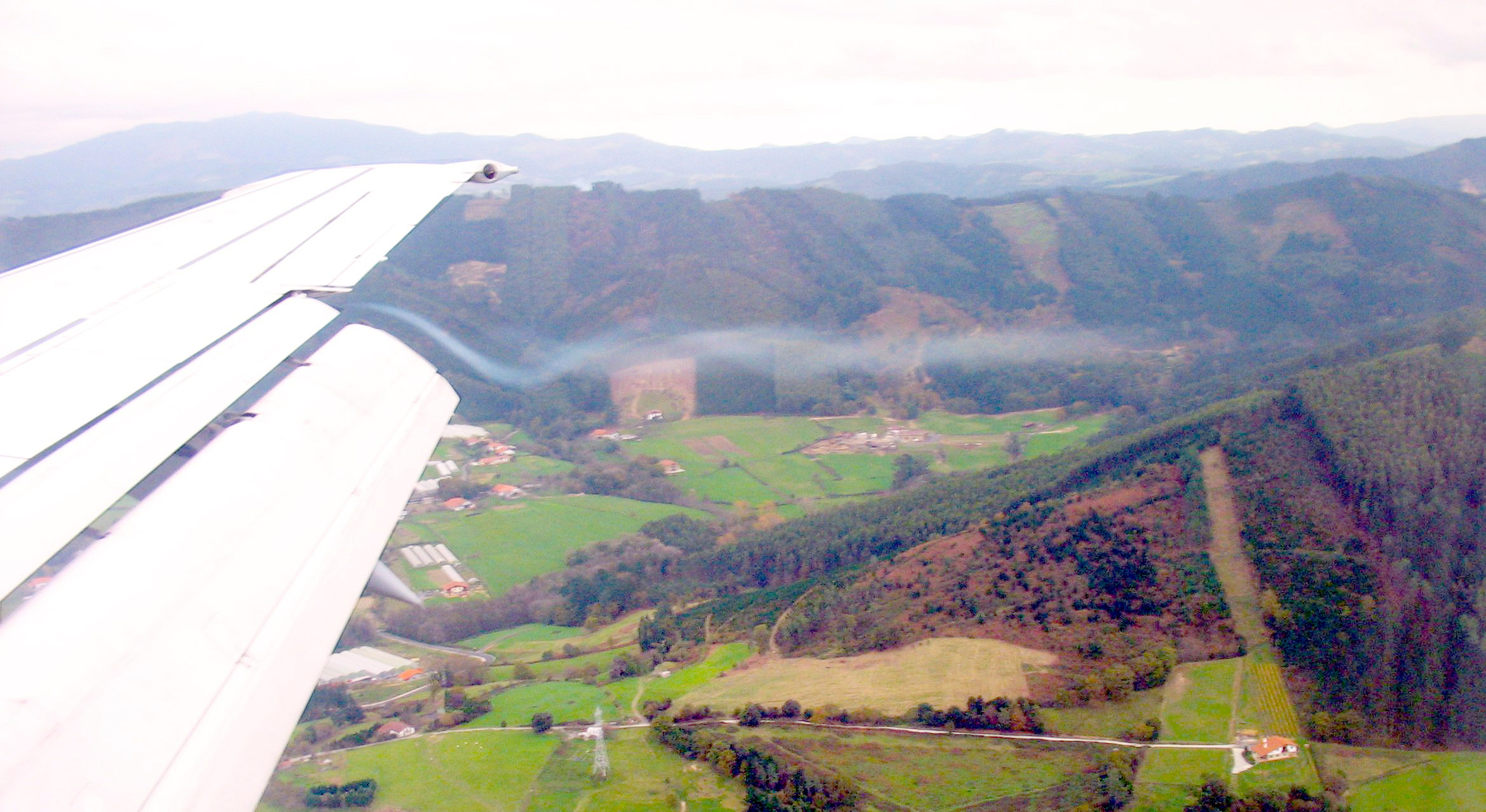
The core of the vortex trailing from the tip of the flap of a commercial airplane with landing flap extended.

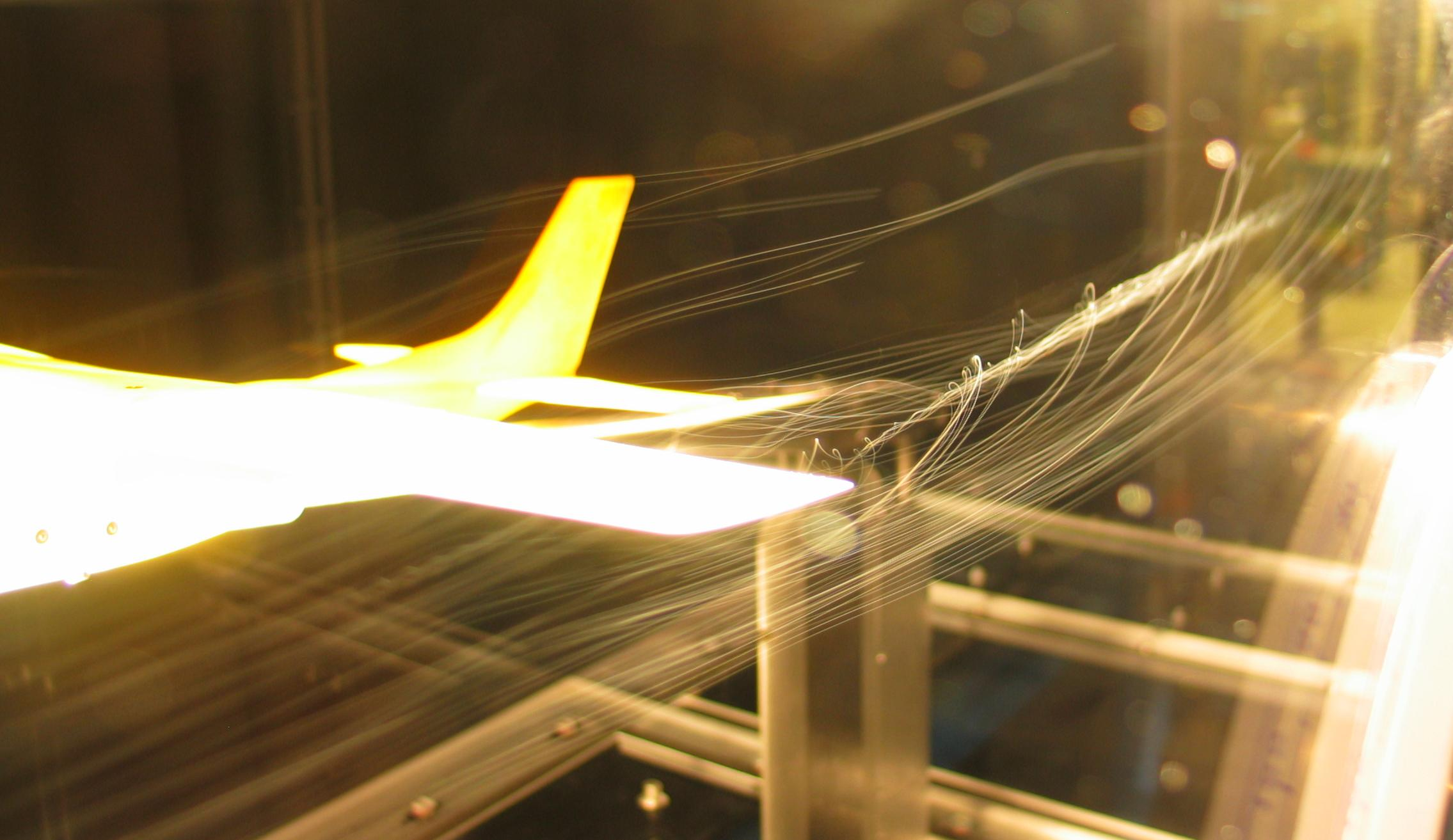
Wingtip vortices from a Cessna 182 wind tunnel model.

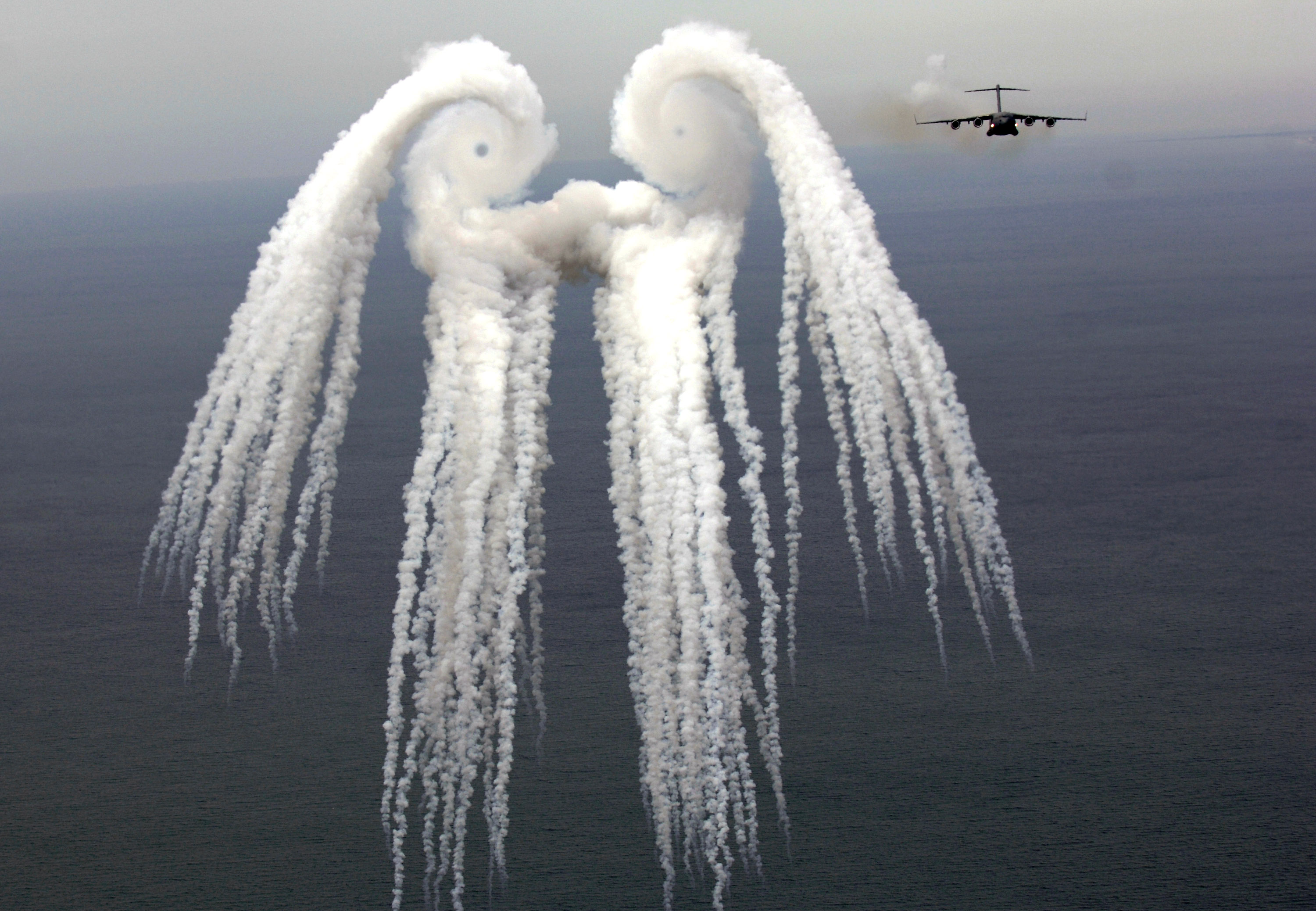
Wingtip vortices shown in flare smoke left behind a C-17 Globemaster III. Also known as smoke angels.

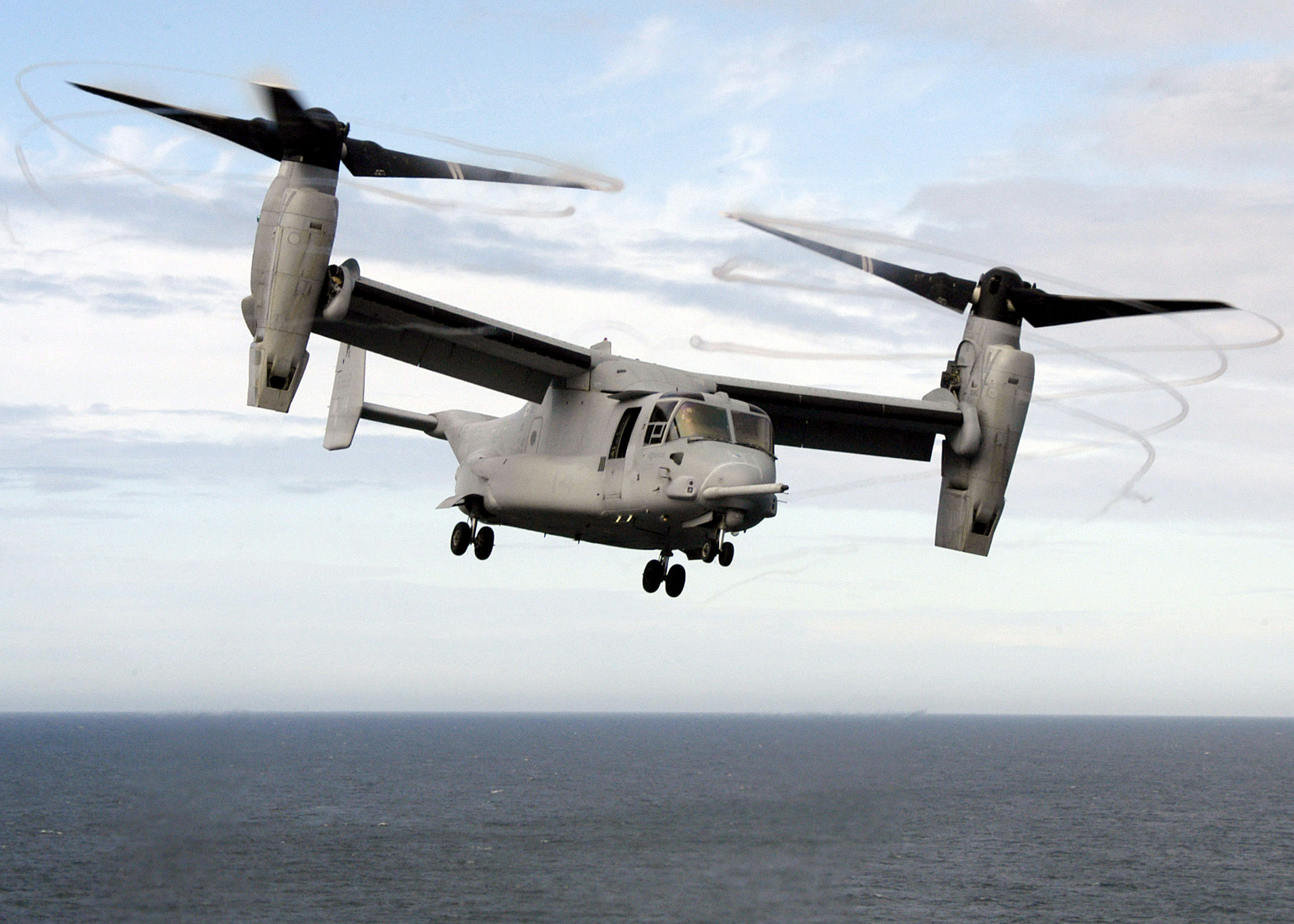
The MV-22 Osprey tiltrotor has a high disk loading, producing visible blade tip vortices.

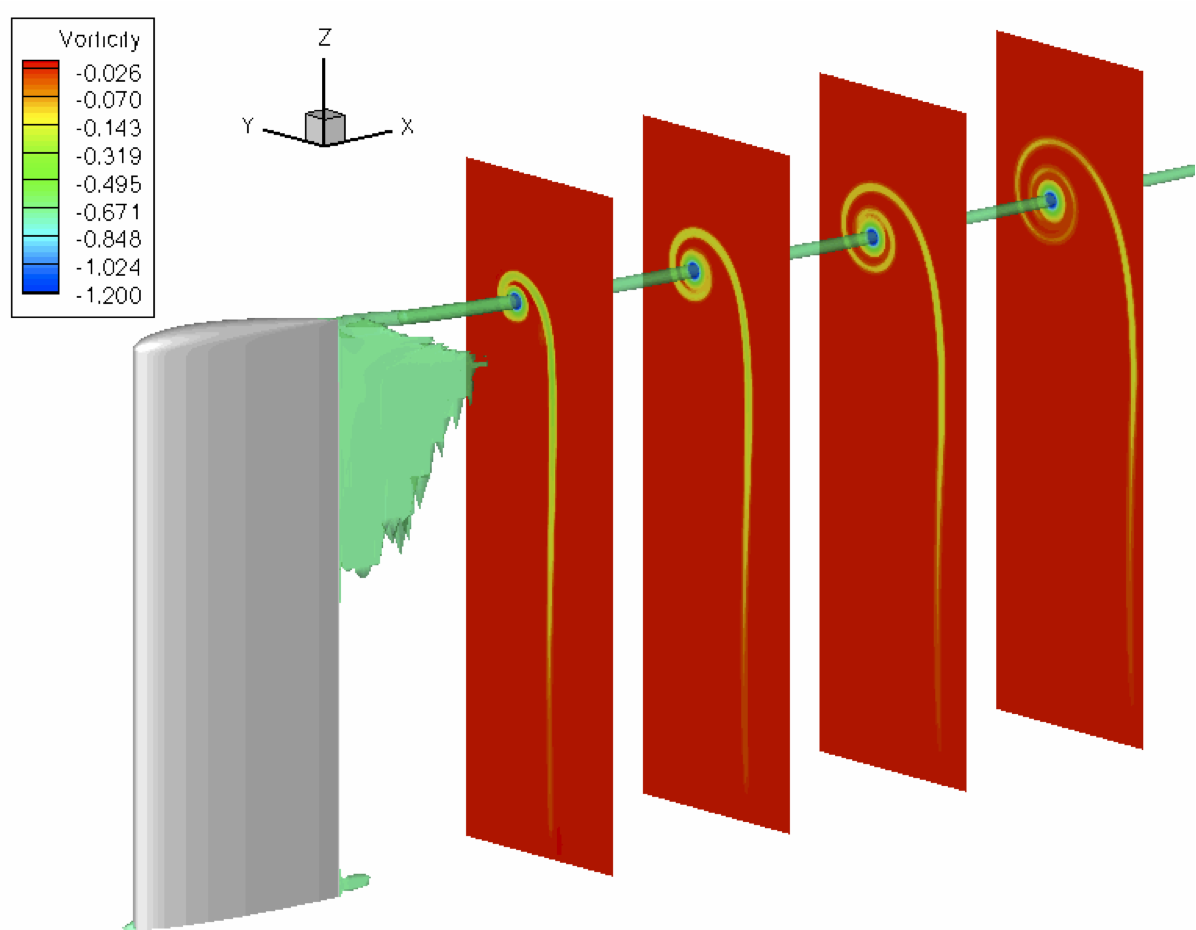
Euler computation of a steady tip vortex. Contour colours and isosurface reveal vorticity.

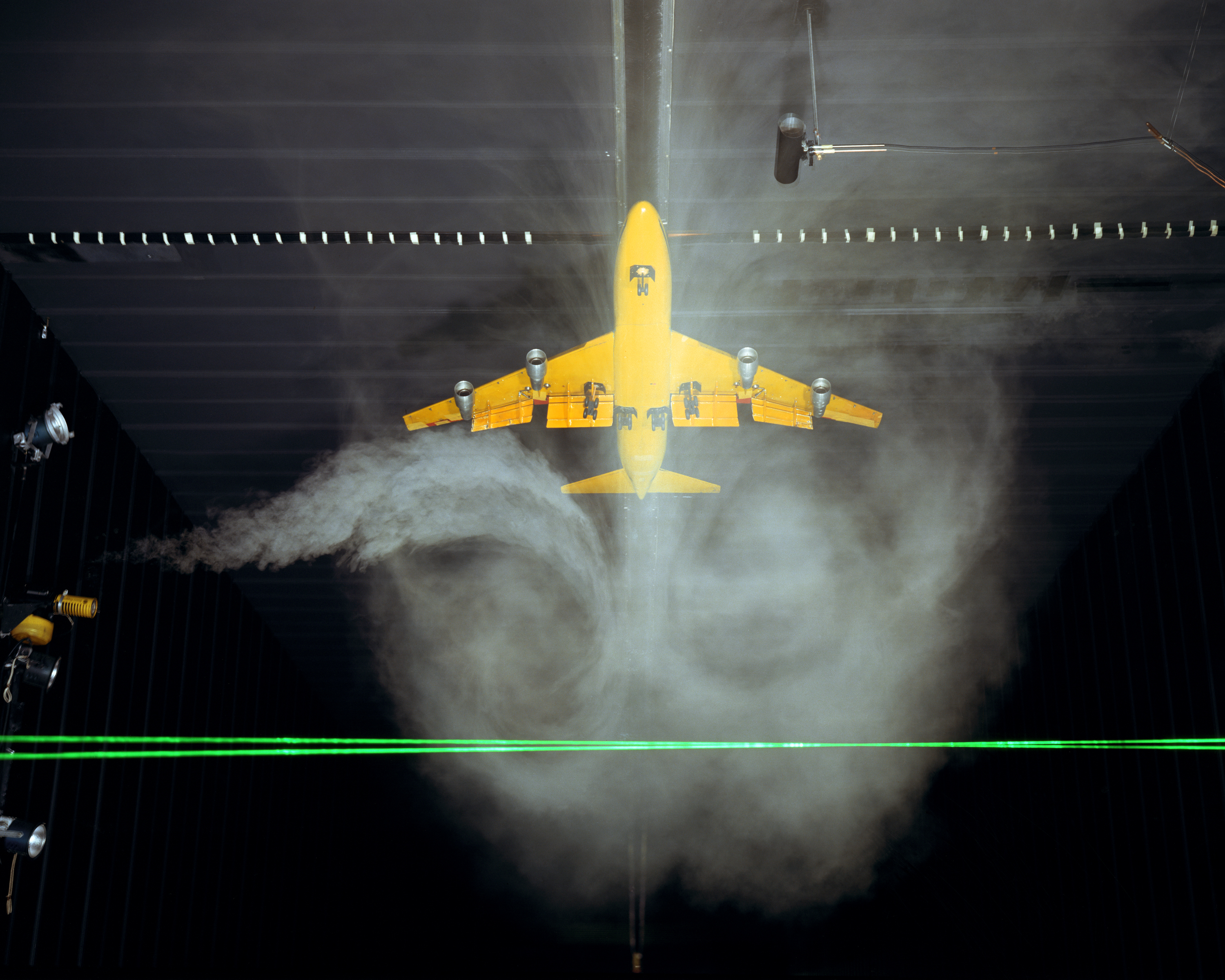
A Boeing 747 model has just passed through a stationary sheet of smoke, which is showing its trailing vortices, at the Vortex Facility at the Langley Research Center.

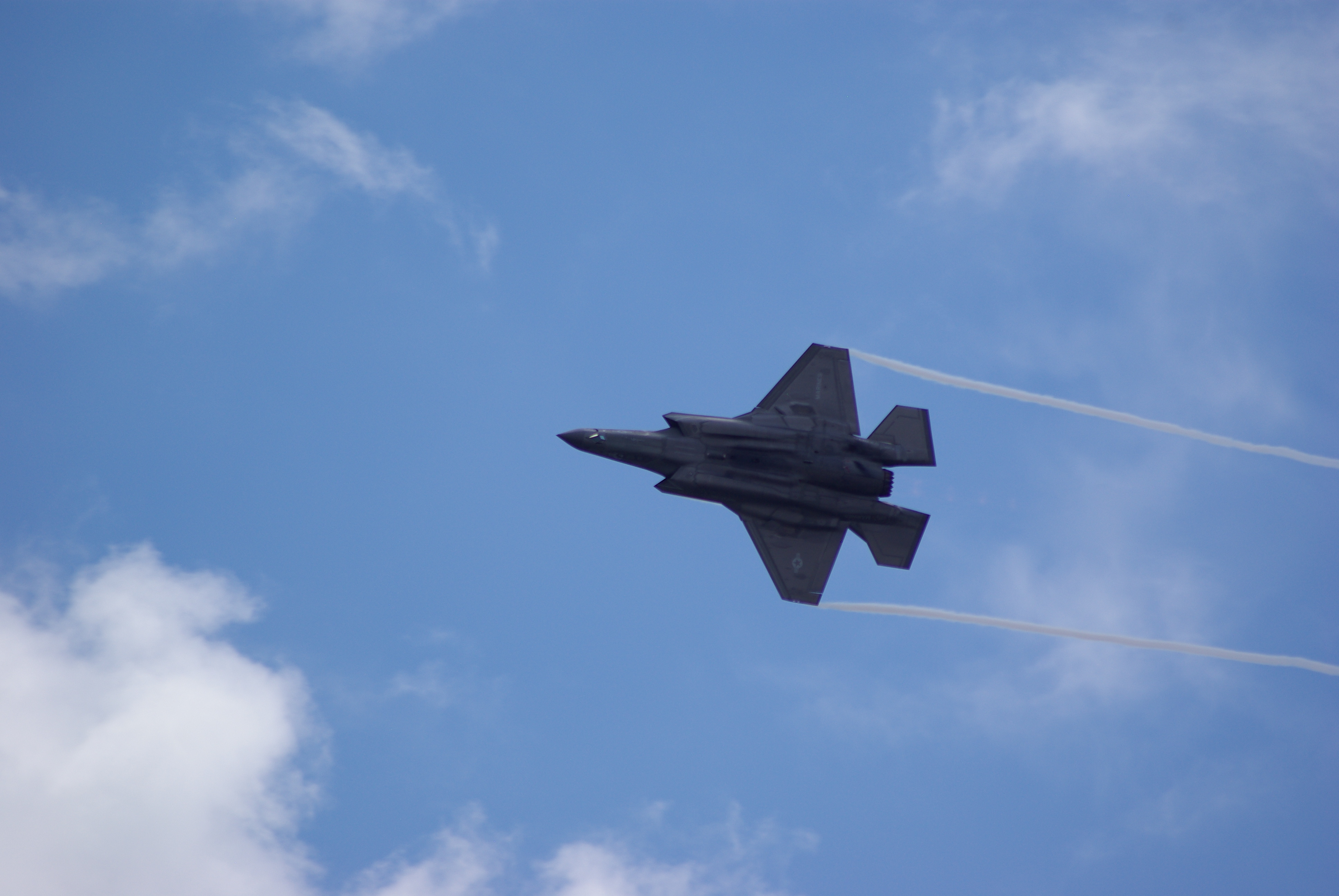
A Lockheed Martin F-35 Lightning II in a turn, showing wingtip vortices.

== See also ==
- Index of aviation articles
- Aspect ratio (wing)
- Chemtrail conspiracy theory
- Crow instability
- Helmholtz's theorems
- Horseshoe vortex
- Lift-induced drag
- V formation
- Vortex
- Wake turbulence
