= Gibe =

Gibe may refer to:

- Gibe (woreda), a district in Southern Nations, Nationalities, and Peoples' Region, Ethiopia
- Gibe River, located in southwestern Ethiopia
- Gibe region, the drainage area south of this river
- Bob Gibe (1928–2005), American Olympic swimmer

== See also ==
- Jibe, a sailing maneuver
- Gybe (disambiguation)
