= Wind-powered vehicle =

Vehicle propelled by wind

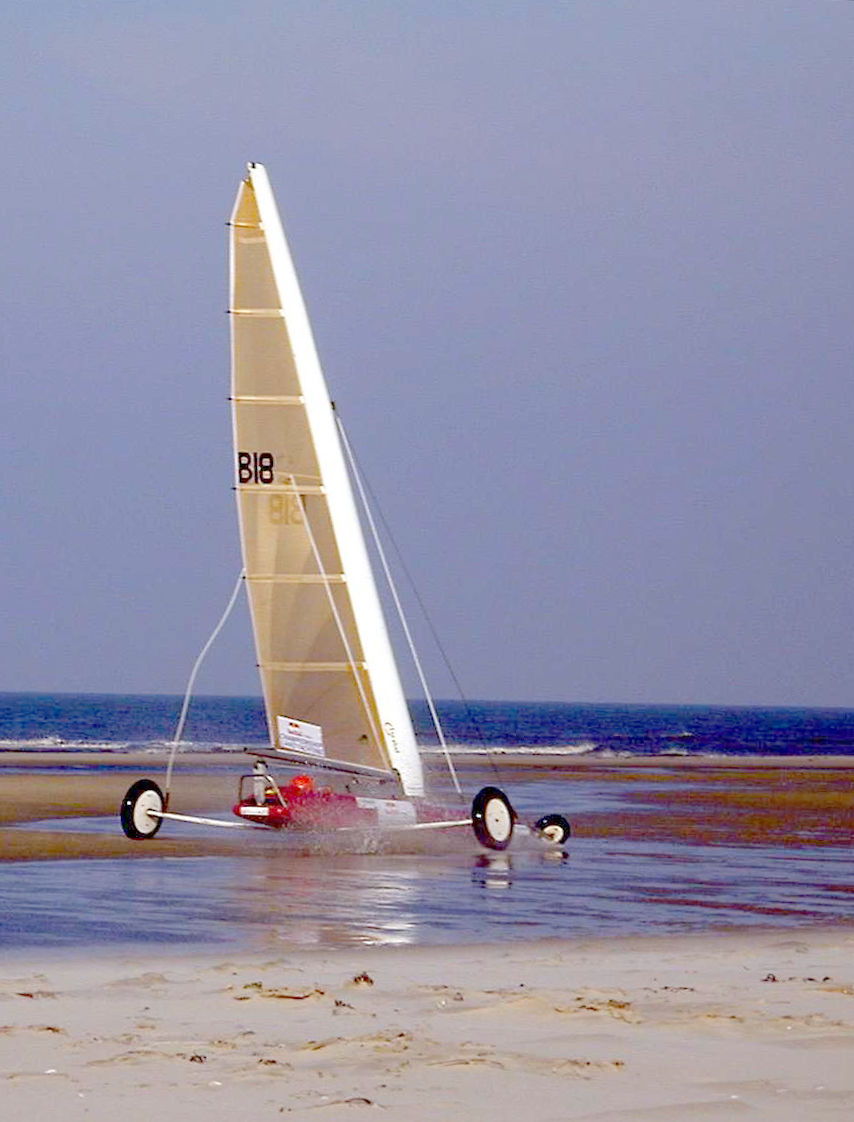
A Belgian Class 3 competition land yacht

Wind-powered vehicles derive their power from sails, kites or rotors and ride on wheels—which may be linked to a wind-powered rotor—or runners. Whether powered by sail, kite or rotor, these vehicles share a common trait: As the vehicle increases in speed, the advancing airfoil encounters an increasing apparent wind at an angle of attack that is increasingly smaller. At the same time, such vehicles are subject to relatively low forward resistance, compared with traditional sailing craft. As a result, such vehicles are often capable of speeds exceeding that of the wind.

Rotor-powered examples have demonstrated ground speeds that exceed that of the wind, both directly into the wind and directly downwind by transferring power through a drive train between the rotor and the wheels. The wind-powered speed record is by a vehicle with a sail on it, Greenbird, with a recorded top speed of 202.9 kilometres per hour (126.1 mph).

Other wind-powered conveyances include sailing vessels that travel on water, and balloons and sailplanes that travel in the air, all of which are beyond the scope of this article.

== Sail-powered ==
Sail-powered vehicles travel over land or ice at apparent wind speeds that are higher than the true wind speed, close-hauled on most points of sail. Both land yachts and ice boats have low forward resistance to speed and high lateral resistance to sideways motion.

=== Theory ===
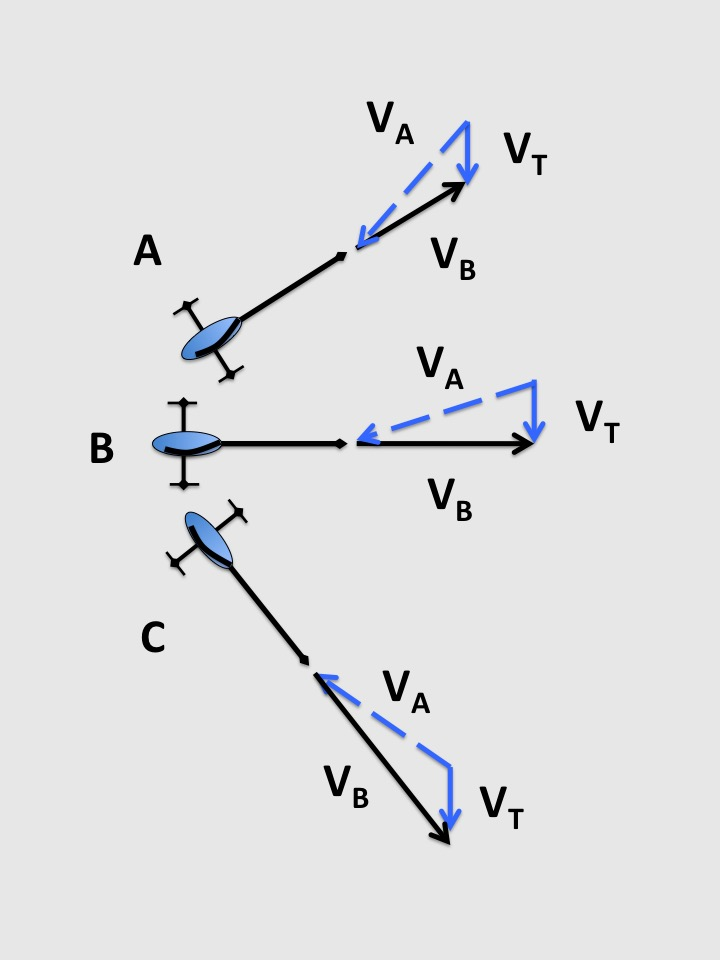
Apparent wind on an iceboat. As the iceboat sails further from the wind, the apparent wind increases slightly and its speed is highest at C on the broad reach.

Aerodynamic forces on sails depend on wind speed and direction and the speed and direction of the craft ( V_{B} ). The direction that the craft is traveling with respect to the true wind (the wind direction and speed over the surface – V_{T} ) is called the point of sail. The speed of the craft at a given point of sail contributes to the apparent wind ( V_{A} )—the wind speed and direction as measured on the moving craft. The apparent wind on the sail creates a total aerodynamic force, which may be resolved into drag—the force component in the direction of the apparent wind—and lift—the force component normal (90°) to the apparent wind. Depending on the alignment of the sail with the apparent wind, lift or drag may be the predominant propulsive component. Total aerodynamic force also resolves into a forward, propulsive, driving force—resisted by the medium through or over which the craft is passing (e.g. through water, air, or over ice, sand)—and a lateral force, resisted by the wheels or ice runners of the vehicle.

Because wind-powered vehicles typically sail at apparent wind angles aligned with the leading edge of the sail, the sail acts as an airfoil and lift is the predominant component of propulsion. Low forward resistance to motion, high speeds over the surface, and high lateral resistance help create high apparent wind speeds—with closer alignment of the apparent wind to the course traveled for most points of sail—and allow wind-powered vehicles to achieve higher speeds than conventional sailing craft.

=== Land yacht ===
Land sailing has evolved from a novelty into a sport, since the 1950s. The vehicles used in sailing are known as land or sand yachts. They typically have three (sometimes four) wheels, which are steered by pedals or hand levers from a sitting or lying position. Land sailing is best suited for windy flat areas; races often take place on beaches, airfields, and dry lake beds in desert regions.

Records for sail-powered vehicles have been set on land, as follows:

- 1999: Iron Duck at 187 kilometres per hour (116 mph)
- 2009: Greenbird at 202.9 kilometres per hour (126.1 mph)
- 2022: Horonuku at 222.4 kilometres per hour (138.2 mph)
- 2023: Horonuku at 225.6 kilometres per hour (140.2 mph)

=== Ice boat ===
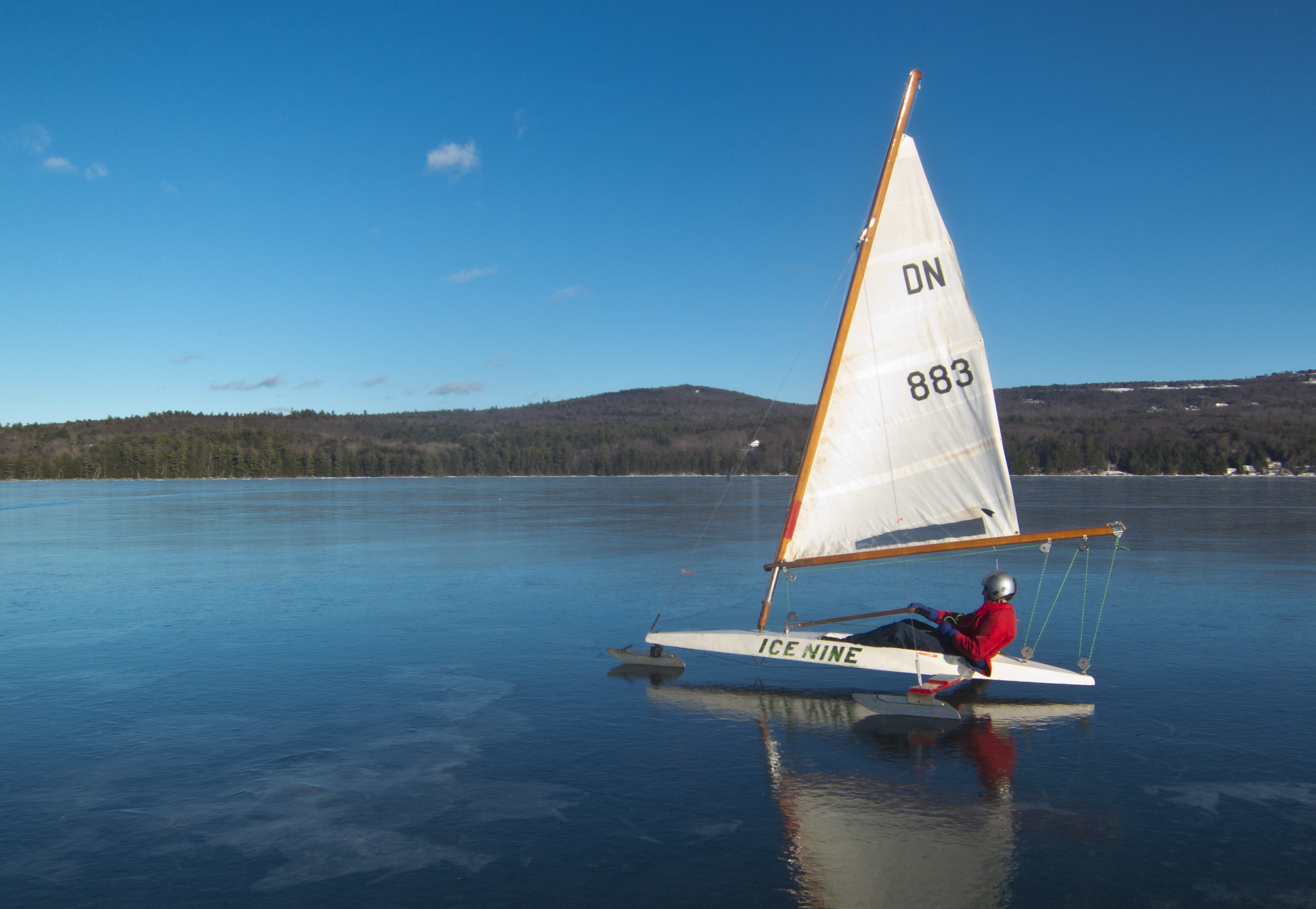
International DN iceboat

Iceboats designs are generally supported by three skate blades called "runners" supporting a triangular or cross-shaped frame with the steering runner in front. Runners are made of iron or steel and sharpened to a fine edge, most often cut to an angled edge of 90 degrees, which holds onto the ice, preventing slippage sideways from the lateral force of the wind developed by the sails. Once the lateral force has been effectively countered by the runner edge, the remaining force of "sail-lift" vacuums the boat forward with significant power. That power increases as the speed of the boat increases, allowing the boat to go much faster than the wind. Limitations to iceboat speed are windage, friction, the camber of the sail shape, strength of construction, and quality of the ice surface. Iceboats can sail as close as 7 degrees off the apparent wind. Ice boats can achieve speeds as high as ten times the wind speed in good conditions. International DN iceboats often achieve speeds of 48 knots (89 km/h; 55 mph) while racing, and speeds as high as 59 knots (109 km/h; 68 mph) have been recorded.

== Kite-powered ==
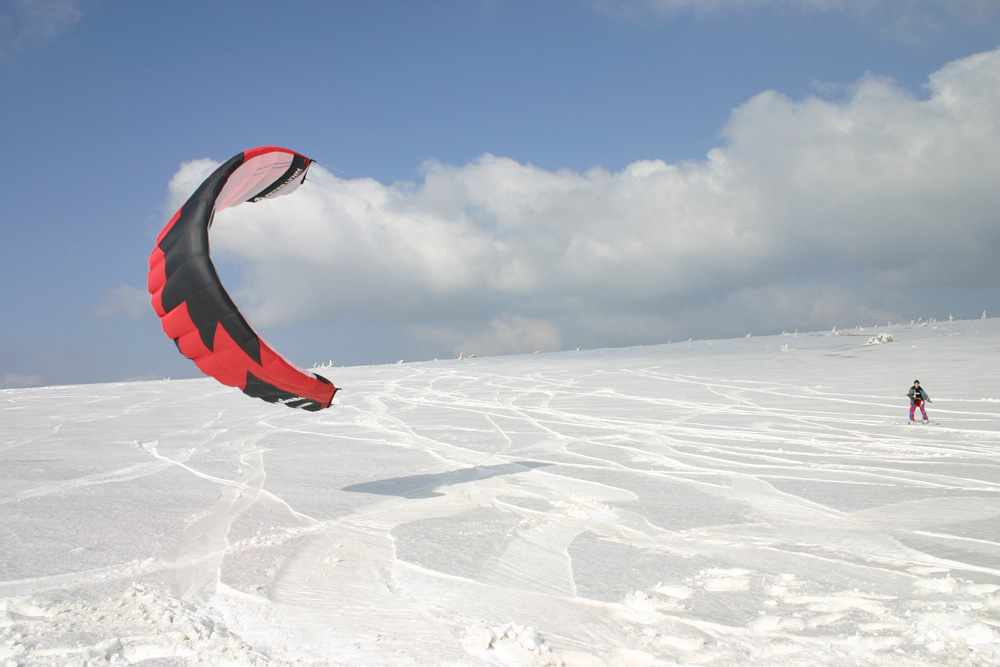
Snow kiters travel over snow or ice.

Kite-powered vehicles include buggies that one can ride in and boards that one can stand on as it slides over snow and ice or rolls on wheels over land.

=== Theory ===
A kite is a tethered air foil that creates both lift and drag, in this case anchored to a vehicle with a tether, which guides the face of the kite to achieve the best angle of attack. The lift that sustains the kite in flight is generated when air flows around the kite's surface, producing low pressure above and high pressure below the wings. The interaction with the wind also generates horizontal drag along the direction of the wind. The resultant force vector from the lift and drag force components is opposed by the tension of one or more of the lines or tethers to which the kite is attached, thereby powering the vehicle.

=== Kite buggy ===
A kite buggy is a light, purpose-built vehicle powered by a power kite. It is single-seated and has one steerable front wheel and two fixed rear wheels. The driver sits in the seat located in the middle of the vehicle and accelerates and slows down by applying steering manoeuvres in coordination with flying manoeuvres of the kite. Kite buggies can reach 110 kilometres per hour (68 mph).

=== Kite board ===
Kite boards of different description are used on dry land or on snow. Kite landboarding involves the use of a mountain board or land board—a skateboard with large pneumatic wheels and foot-straps. Snow kiting is an outdoor winter sport where people use kite power to glide on a board (or skis) over snow or ice.

== Rotor-powered ==
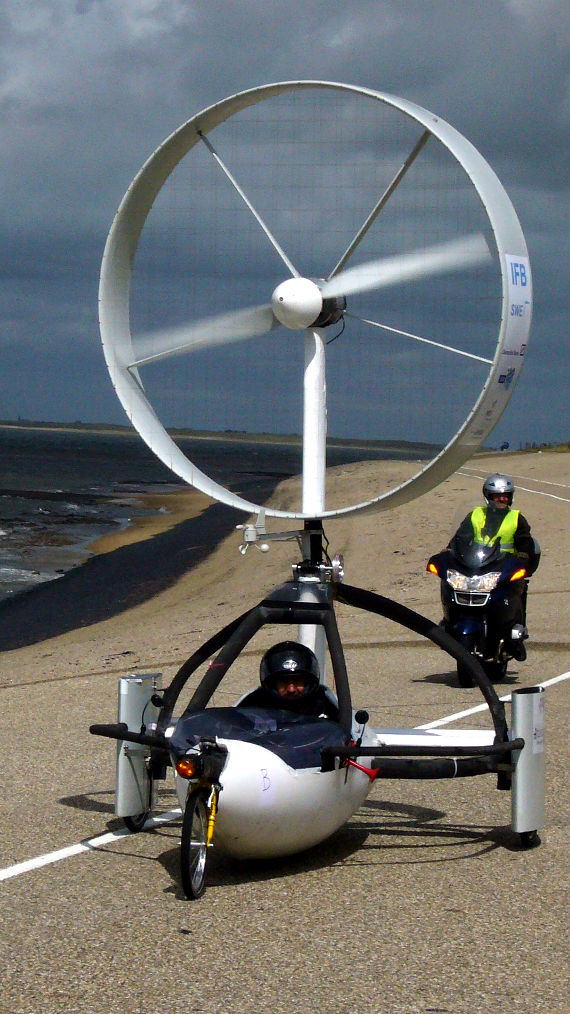
The rotor-powered InVentus Ventomobile racing at the Aeolus Race 2008

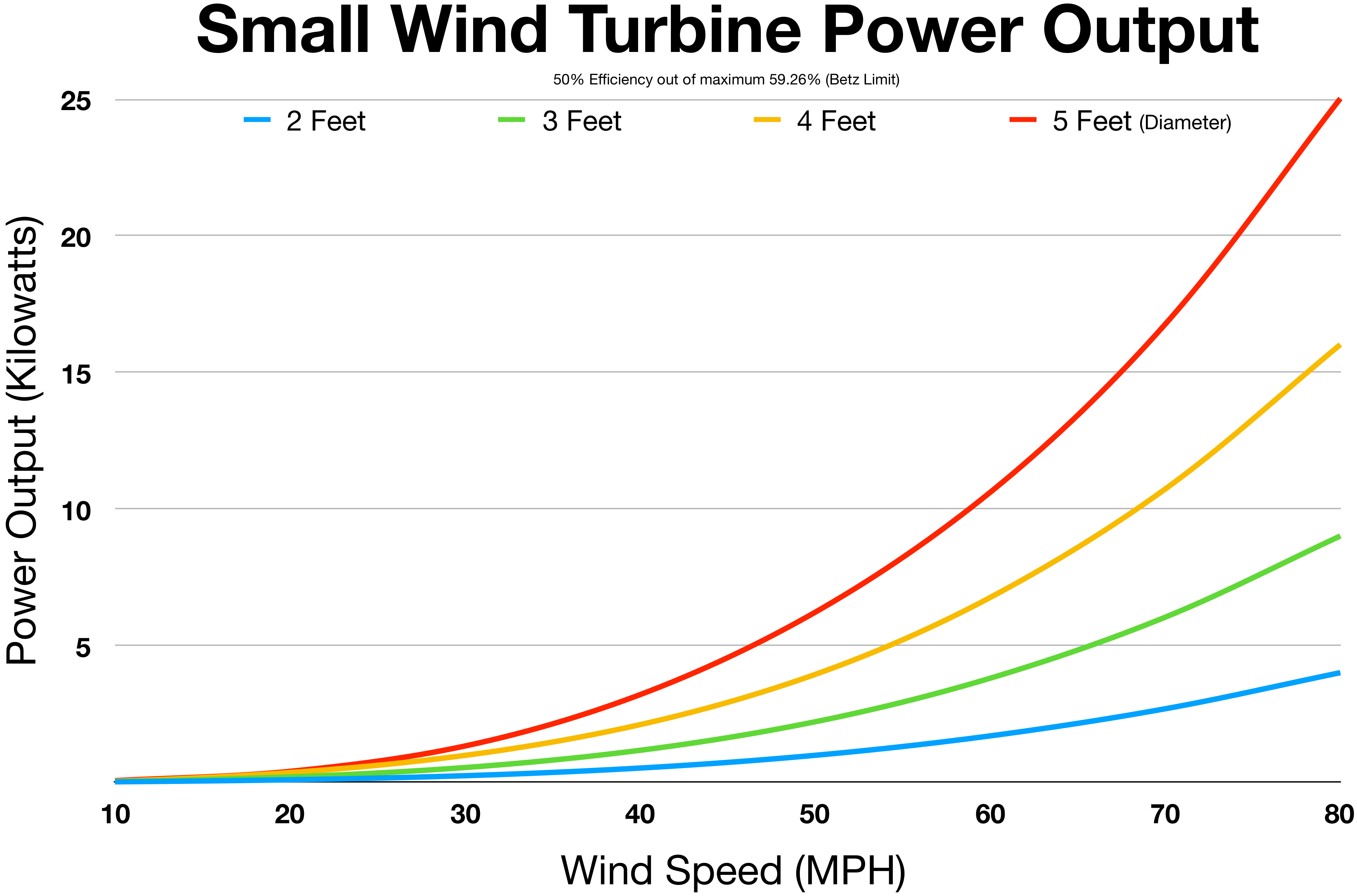
Small wind turbine power output

Rotor-powered vehicles are wind-powered vehicles that use rotors—instead of sails—which may have a shroud around them (ducted fan) or constitute an unducted propeller, and which may adjust orientation to face the apparent wind. The rotor may be connected via a drive train to wheels or to a generator that provides electrical power to electric motors that drive the wheels. Other concepts use a vertical axis wind turbine with airfoils that rotate around a vertical axis. A 1904 version employed a re-purposed rotor from a mass-produced windmill with its gearing connected to driving wheels.

=== Theory ===
A vehicle with a bladed rotor mechanically connected to the wheels can be designed to go at a speed faster than that of the wind, both directly into the wind and directly downwind. Upwind, the rotor works as a wind turbine driving the wheels. Downwind, it works as a propeller, driven by the wheels. In both cases, power comes from the difference in velocity between the air mass and the ground, as received by the vehicle's rotor or wheels.

Relative to the vehicle, both the air and the ground are passing backwards. However, travelling upwind, the air is coming at the vehicle faster than the ground, whereas travelling downwind faster than the wind speed, the air is coming at the vehicle more slowly than the ground. The vehicle draws power from the faster of the two media in each case and imparts it to the slower of the two: upwind, drawing power from the wind and imparting it to the wheels and, downwind, drawing power from the wheels and imparting it to the rotor—in each case in proportion to the velocity of the medium, relative to the vehicle.

In summary:

- Upwind, the rotor harvests the power from the oncoming air and drives the wheels, as would a wind turbine.
- Downwind, when the vehicle is traveling faster than the windspeed, the ground is the fastest-moving medium relative to the vehicle, so the wheels harvest the power and impart it to the rotor, which propels the vehicle.

How fast a given wind speed can propel a vehicle in either direction is limited only by the efficiency of the turbine blades, losses in the drive train, and the vehicle's aerodynamic drag, apart from the drag of the turbine.

The same principles apply to a watercraft using a wind turbine to drive a screw propeller in the water upwind, or using a water turbine to drive a propeller in the airstream downwind.

=== Fixed-course vehicles ===
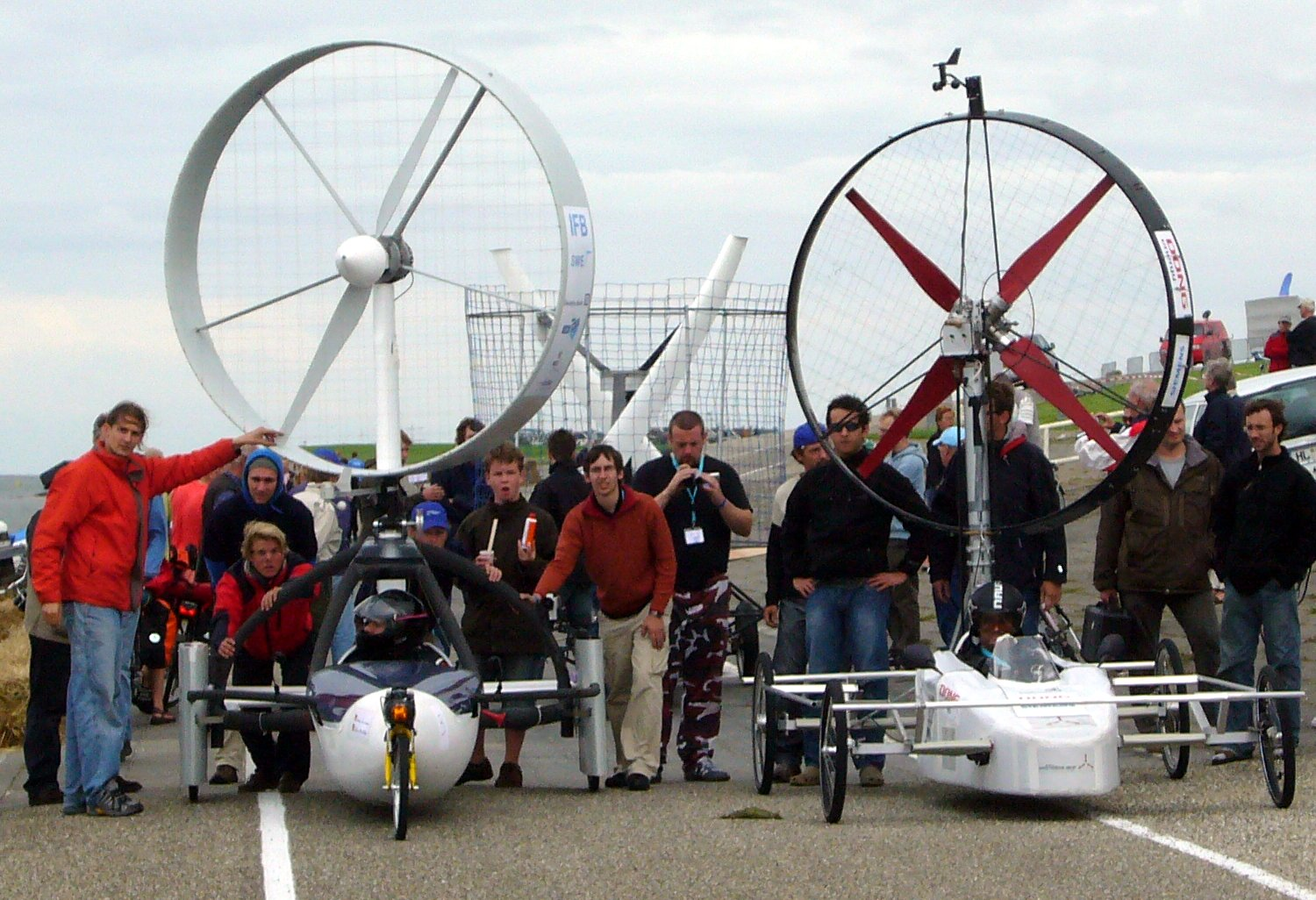
Competition rotor-powered vehicles: Ventomobile and winD TUrbine set for a drag race

Several competitions have been held for rotor-powered vehicles. Notable among them is Racing Aeolus, an event held annually in the Netherlands. Participating universities build entries to determine the best and fastest wind-powered vehicle. The rules are that the vehicles ride on wheels, with one driver, propelled by a rotor, coupled to the wheels. Temporary storage of energy is allowed, if empty at the beginning of the race. Charging the storage device is counted as race time. Racing takes place towards the wind. Vehicles are judged by their fastest run, innovation, and the results of a series of drag races. In 2008, entrants were from: Stuttgart University, the Flensburg University of Applied Sciences, the Energy Research Centre of the Netherlands, the Technical University of Denmark, the Kiel University of Applied Sciences and Kiel University. Two top performers have been the "Ventomobile" and Spirit of Amsterdam (1 and 2).

==== Ventomobile ====
The Ventomobile was a wind-powered lightweight three-wheeler designed by University of Stuttgart students. It had a carbon-fiber rotor support that was directed into the wind and variably pitched rotor blades that adjust for wind speed. Power transmission between the rotor and the driving wheels was via two bicycle gearboxes and a bicycle chain. It won the first prize at the Racing Aeolus held at Den Helder, Netherlands, in August 2008.

==== Spirit of Amsterdam ====
The wind-powered land vehicles Spirit of Amsterdam and Spirit of Amsterdam 2 were built by the Hogeschool van Amsterdam (University of Applied Science Amsterdam). In 2009 and 2010 the Spirit of Amsterdam team won first prize at the Racing Aeolus held in Denmark. The Spirit of Amsterdam 2 was the second vehicle built by the Hogeschool van, Amsterdam. It used a wind turbine to capture the wind velocity and used mechanical power to propel the vehicle against the wind. This vehicle was capable of driving 6.6 metres per second (15 mph) with a 10 metres per second (22 mph) wind. An onboard computer automatically shifted gears to achieve optimum performance.

=== Straight-line vehicles ===
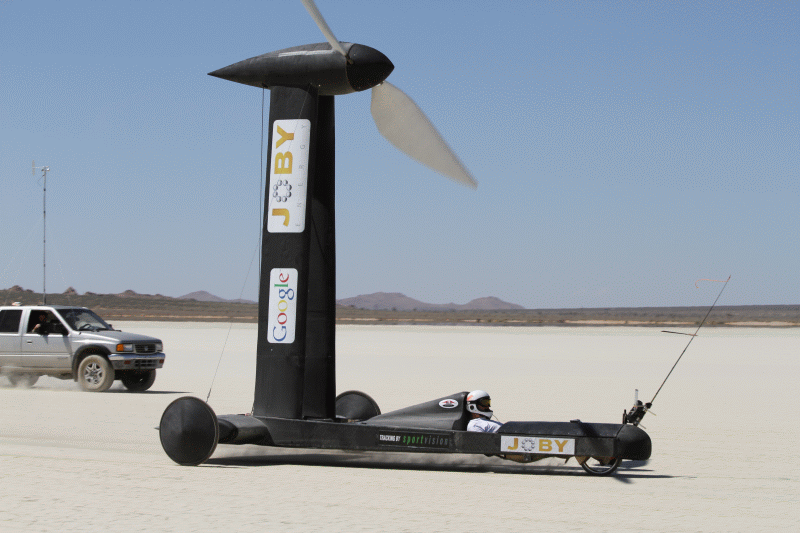
Wind-powered vehicle, Blackbird, was designed to go faster than the wind, dead downwind.

Some wind-powered vehicles are built solely to demonstrate a limited principle, e.g. the ability to go upwind or downwind faster than the prevailing windspeed.

In 1904 George Phillips of Webster, South Dakota demonstrated a propeller driven vehicle that could travel against the wind.

In 1969, Andrew Bauer—a wind tunnel engineer for the Douglas Aircraft Company—built and demonstrated a propeller-driven vehicle that could go directly downwind faster than the windspeed, which was recorded in a video. He published the concept in the same year.

In 2006, Jack Goodman published a video of a similar homemade design, describing it as "directly downwind faster than the wind" (DDFTTW). In 2008, Rick Cavallaro—an aerospace engineer and computer technologist—made a toy model based on that design, that fit on a treadmill, and submitted a video of it to the Mythbusters video challenge.

In 2010, Cavallaro built and piloted a wind-driven vehicle, Blackbird, in cooperation with the San Jose State University aviation department in a project sponsored by Google, to demonstrate the feasibility of going directly downwind faster than the wind. He achieved two validated milestones, going both directly downwind and directly upwind faster than the speed of the prevailing wind.

- Downwind—In 2010, Blackbird set the world's first certified record for going directly downwind faster than the wind, using only wind power. The vehicle achieved a dead downwind speed of about 2.8 times the speed of the wind. In 2011 a streamlined Blackbird reached close to 3 times the speed of wind.
- Upwind—In 2012, Blackbird set the world's first certified record for going directly upwind faster than the wind, using only wind power. The vehicle achieved a dead upwind speed of about 2.1 times the speed of the wind.

Blackbird has been analyzed a number of times since then, in research papers and on the 2013 International Physics Olympiad, and a working toy model was reconstructed with 3d-printing instructions in 2021.

== See also ==
- High-performance sailing
- Land sailing
- Kitesurfing
- Sail bogey
- Windmill ship
- Strandbeest creations of Theo Jansen
