= Death roll =

Kind of unstable behavior in sailing

In a keel boat, a death roll is the act of broaching to windward, putting the spinnaker pole into the water and causing a crash-jibe of the boom and mainsail, which sweep across the deck and plunge down into the water. The death roll often results in the destruction of the spinnaker pole and sometimes even the dismasting of the boat. Serious injury to crew is possible due to the swift and uncontrolled action of the boom and associated gear sweeping across the boat and crashing to the (now) leeward side.

For dinghy sailors, a death roll is a common type of oscillation while running downwind. It may, and often will, result in a capsize and even a full inversion if the skipper does not take quick action to prevent one.

During a death roll, the boat rolls from side to side, becoming gradually more unstable until either it capsizes or the skipper reacts correctly to prevent it. While on the dead run, off the wind, the force exerted by the sail lies almost parallel to the center line of the boat. There is little or no force causing the boat to heel to leeward, unlike most other points of sailing, and, if the sail is out past perpendicular to the center line, or the sail is incorrectly shaped, there may be a force causing the boat to heel to windward. Instabilities in the wind, and turbulence caused by the sail, which 'fouls' the wind on such a tack, may cause this force to change rapidly. Most sailors also retract the centerboards of their dinghies while on the run, to reduce drag and increase speed. The lack of resistance to the rolling motion can enhance it.

IOR (International Offshore Racing) boats in the 1970s and 1980s were known for death rolls due to their small mains that made them unbalanced downwind. Many boats put up spankers, big A-type sails set to leeward and flown away from the boat, to balance the boat. The higher the wind speed, the more important the spanker was to balance the boat.

== Boats prone to death rolls ==
High-performance racing dinghies are most prone to death roll situations.

These include skiff designs, such as the Musto Skiff, 29er, 49er and International 14. Sailors of these boats generally prefer to sail on the broad reach rather than on the dead run because the boat is more stable and actually faster. Additionally, as their speed increases on the broad reach, their apparent wind changes to allow them to point lower. Often they can point as low as the other boats, only faster. See Sailing faster than the wind.

More traditional racing dinghies such as the Laser and Laser Radial are also prone to death rolls. Singlehanders without shrouds will actually sail faster downwind when sailing slightly "by the lee", or past dead downwind, where stability improves and death rolls are less likely.
