= Sailing into the wind =

Boating opposite an air current

Sailing into the wind is a sailing expression that refers to a sail boat's ability to move forward despite heading toward, but not directly into, the wind. A sailboat cannot sail directly into the wind; the closest it can point is called close hauled, typically at an angle of about 45 degrees to the wind.

This maneuver is possible due to the interaction between the sails and the keel. The sail generates lift (similar to an airplane wing), and the keel resists lateral movement through the water, converting the side force from the wind into forward motion. Although the sail force acts partly sideways, the keel’s counteracting force keeps the boat on course and propels it forward.

The more precisely the sail is trimmed (angled closer to the boat’s centerline), the more the resulting force is directed forward rather than sideways.

To reach a destination directly upwind, a sailboat must tack— alternate between port and starboard close-hauled courses. This zigzag pattern allows gradual progress toward the wind.

== Points of sail ==
Sailing terminology defines various orientations to the wind, known as "points of sail". When a boat is "head to wind" — pointing directly into the wind — it loses momentum and steerage, a condition known as "being in irons". Therefore, when a boat is said to be "sailing into the wind," it is in fact sailing close-hauled.

Attempting to sail too close to the wind is called pinching, which reduces speed and efficiency. It may also cause the sails to luff (flutter) and lose drive.

== See also ==
Windmill ship - a ship which uses a windmill or wind turbine to drive an underwater propeller, some varieties can overcome the upwind-sailing problem of conventional sailing ships.
