= Cop slide =

Internet phenomenon

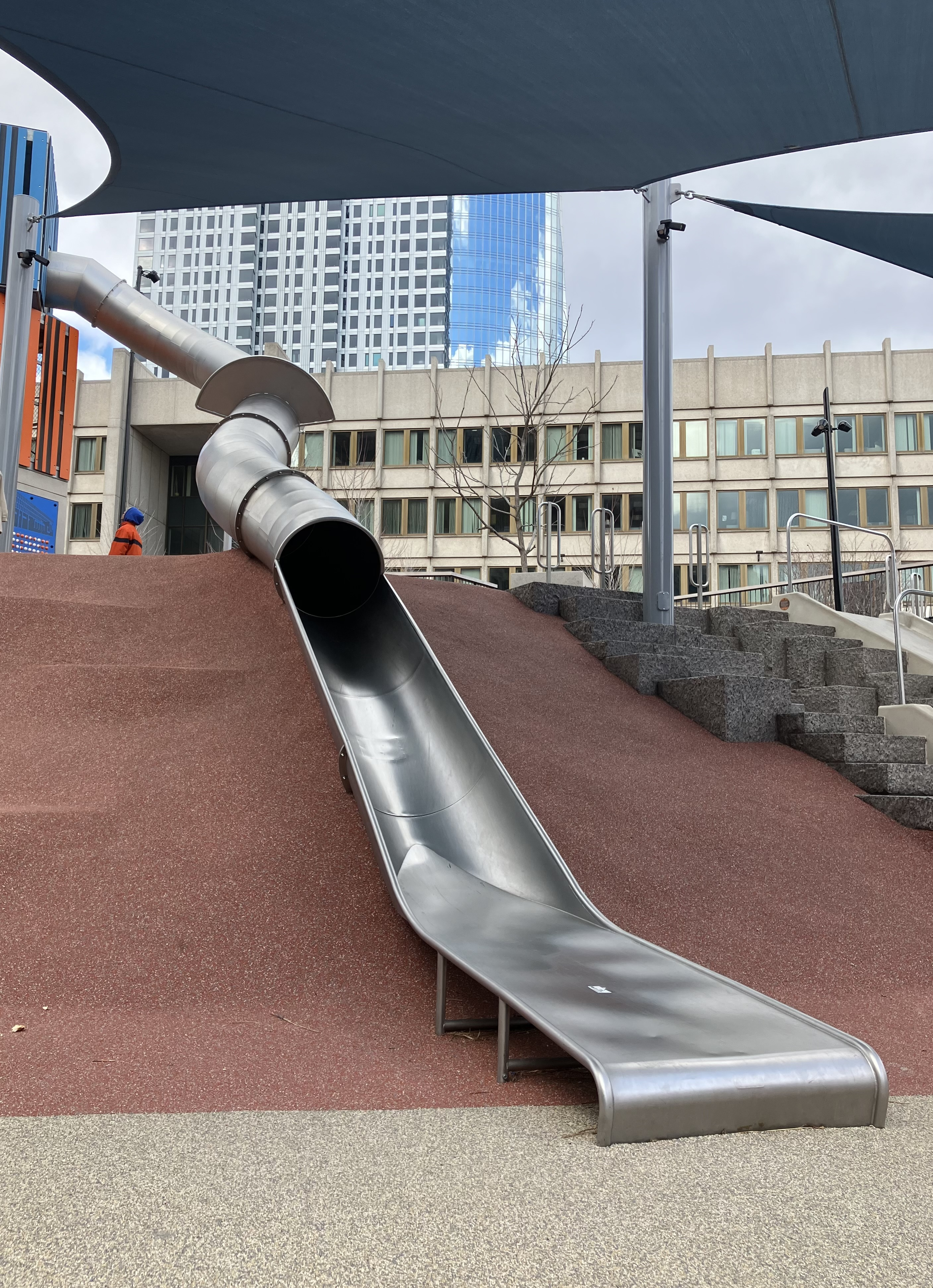
- The slide at Boston City Hall Plaza
- Interactive map of Cop slide
- Coordinates: 42.36121°N 71.05818°W

The "Cop slide" (or "Boston cop slide") is an internet meme and viral phenomenon caused by a video of a police officer tumbling down a children's slide in the playground of Boston City Hall Plaza in Boston, Massachusetts. The video became viral on TikTok in August 2023, causing an influx of visitors using the slide and prompting enforcement of restrictions on its use by the city, as well as scientific analysis of the initial incident. More recently, it has been a landmark for tourists; members of the Tartan Army (fans of the Scottish national soccer team) used it during the 2026 FIFA World Cup.

== Background ==
The slide was situated in the $95 million plaza outside Boston City Hall designed by architecture firm Sasaki. These renovation plans were overseen by then-Mayor of Boston Martin J. Walsh. The city struggled to attract the public to the area prior to the incident. The slide itself was installed in November 2022 as part of a $70 million renovation, and was intended for children between the ages of 5 and 12 and was labeled as such. Adults had been using the slide since its installation, with one woman sending a letter of complaint to the city after sustaining a "baseball" sized injury on her head but being dismissed when officials determined the city was not liable.

== "Cop slide" meme ==
On July 29, 2023, at about 6:35 p.m., a Boston police officer slid down the slide and was filmed emerging from the end of the slide at high speed. He sustained a minor head injury and was treated by Boston Emergency Medical Services using his own medical insurance. He did not miss work time nor face any disciplinary action.

The video of the incident was originally posted by Live Boston News under the Twitter username @liveboston617 on August 1, 2023, who acquired the video along with a second angle filmed a few feet away. The original video has since gotten over 45 million views with the second angle getting over 5 million views. It then also became viral on TikTok. Visits to the site increased significantly, with many adults using the slide. On August 3, one Twitter user claimed there was "a 45-minute wait to use the cop slide," a claim repeated by multiple media outlets. The city received several complaints of injuries. News of the video was reported by major outlets including CNN, HuffPost, CBS News, the New York Post, the Daily Mail, NBC News, and The Independent. The slide was labeled "Cop Slide" on Google Maps as a "tourist attraction". In October, the video was featured on Last Week Tonight with John Oliver in its first episode following the 2023 Writers Guild of America strike.

=== Slide restrictions ===
On August 8, Mayor of Boston Michelle Wu stated that "we want all of our public spaces to be beloved and if it looks like we need to make sure that there’s more signage that this is for children or something, we can do that too".

On the night of August 10, it was noticed by a Tumblr user that barricades had been placed by Boston property management department to block off the slide, as well as two smaller slides next to it, and that the site was being patrolled by "people who hate fun". A spokesperson for Wu later stated that the attention received by adult visitors to the slide at night had made the barriers necessary as a temporary measure, and that the barriers were no longer used at night. On August 24, a journalist for WBUR tried the slide and noted that he was "the only childless adult on the premises" and that "the kids have reclaimed their playscape." Once the slide was fully reopened, signage had been added to warn adults that the slide was made for children.

=== Tourism ===
By 2026, tourists following the Freedom Trail were known to line up to go down the slide, and during the 2026 Boston Marathon, many tourists came to the site. Mayor Wu remarked that the slide was "a huge must-do that we know visitors from all around have on their list", and noted that she had been down the slide herself while still cautioning that it was made for children. During the 2026 FIFA World Cup in June, members of the Tartan Army—fans of the Scotland national association football team—came to Boston and several made use of the slide, many in kilts, one doing so while playing "Scotland the Brave" on the bagpipes. The slide was visited by American singer-songwriter Olivia Rodrigo in 2026.

== Scientific analysis ==
Social media users and news outlets noted that some slide users were able to use the slide normally, while other users including the police officer ended up upside down. Several theories formed as to why this took place, with media outlets such as HuffPost and Slate recruiting biomechanists and physicists including Rhett Allain to determine the reason. Theories that the difference depended on the weight of the user were contradicted by the fact that despite greater mass leading to greater gravitational force, this greater gravitational force is applied to a more massive object.

Some scientists argued that the police officer's fast descent was caused by the low coefficient of friction between his synthetic fabric uniform and the metal of the slide, as well as its curved design which one injury biomechanics expert said could cause passengers to swoop up its side, similar to the movement of a luge.
