= Random leg course =

A random leg course race, also known as a 'fixed course race' or a 'point-to-point race', is a type of sailing race where the race course may require beating, reaching, and running, and where the rounding marks may be chosen by the race committee without considering the actual wind direction or weather conditions. This contrasts with the more common windward-leeward courses, also known as 'buoy races' or, more colloquially, 'sausage races' that are set dead upwind or dead downwind with no reaching legs.

Compared to the windward-leeward courses, random leg courses tend to be over longer distances, involve a larger number of factors that need to be considered, and require the use of more sailing manoeuvres and a greater variety of skills—fetching and reaching, in addition to beating and running, calculating the true wind angle for each leg, the best sail combination for each point of sail, the fastest route to the next mark, whether the boat will be slower or faster than the main competition on a particular leg, how to take advantage of that differential, etc., making random leg races more versatile than windward-leeward races.

== See also ==
- Points of sail
- Glossary of nautical terms (disambiguation)
