= Gybe =

Gybe may refer to:

- Gybe, an alternative spelling of jibe, a sailing maneuver
  - Chinese gybe, a type of jibe
- Godspeed You! Black Emperor, a Canadian post-rock band, commonly abbreviated to GY!BE
- God Speed You! Black Emperor, a Japanese motorcycle film that gave the band their name.
