= Rhett Allain =

American associate professor of physics

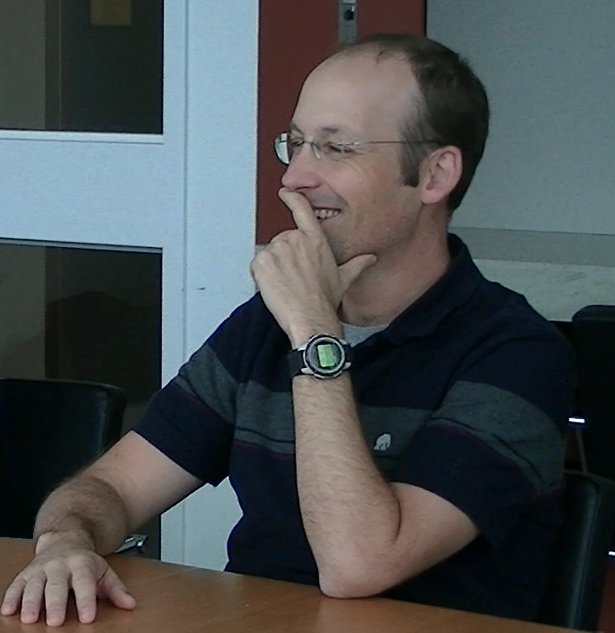
- Rhett Allain speaking at Cornell University in 2012
- Citizenship: United States
- Education: North Carolina State University, Benedictine University, University of Alabama
- Scientific career
- Fields: Physics, blogging, science communication
- Workplaces: Southeastern Louisiana University, Wired magazine
- Website: Dot Physics Articles

Rhett Allain is an American associate professor of physics at Southeastern Louisiana University and the author of the Wired magazine science blog Dot Physics. He received his Ph.D. from North Carolina State University in 2001 and works in the field of physics education research.

In his blog, Dot Physics, Allain discusses physical concepts, answers questions related to physics and math, and debunks questionable physical claims. Many of his posts are supported by experiments, calculations, and models. Recently, he has analyzed the physics behind the Angry Birds Space video game and behind a now-debunked video which purported to show a man flying with home-made wings. He has also criticized television shows, including Fight Science, that perform poorly controlled experiments which are presented as scientific.

In 2008 Allain rejected the concept of sailing dead downwind faster than the wind as a violation of conservation laws, stating that "this is the same situation as people trying to make energy from nothing". When the concept was demonstrated to work in practice by the Blackbird in 2010, Allain didn't offer further explanations and merely noted: "If it works, does it matter what I say?"

In 2011 Rhett became the science advisor for the Discovery Channel show Mythbusters and continues to work on it today with the new Mythbusters. He is also a technical consultant for the CBS show MacGyver. Rhett Allain is also a host on Southeastern's KSLU Radio with his show "STEM Science Radio", which Allain says is, "...redundant because science appears twice, but I didn't come up with the name."

== Personal ==
Allain describes himself as "a slacker by night." His favorite saying is "I like to take things apart, but I can't always put them back together." Allain has been married for 22 years and has 4 children.
