= High-performance sailing =

Optimizing sailboat speed

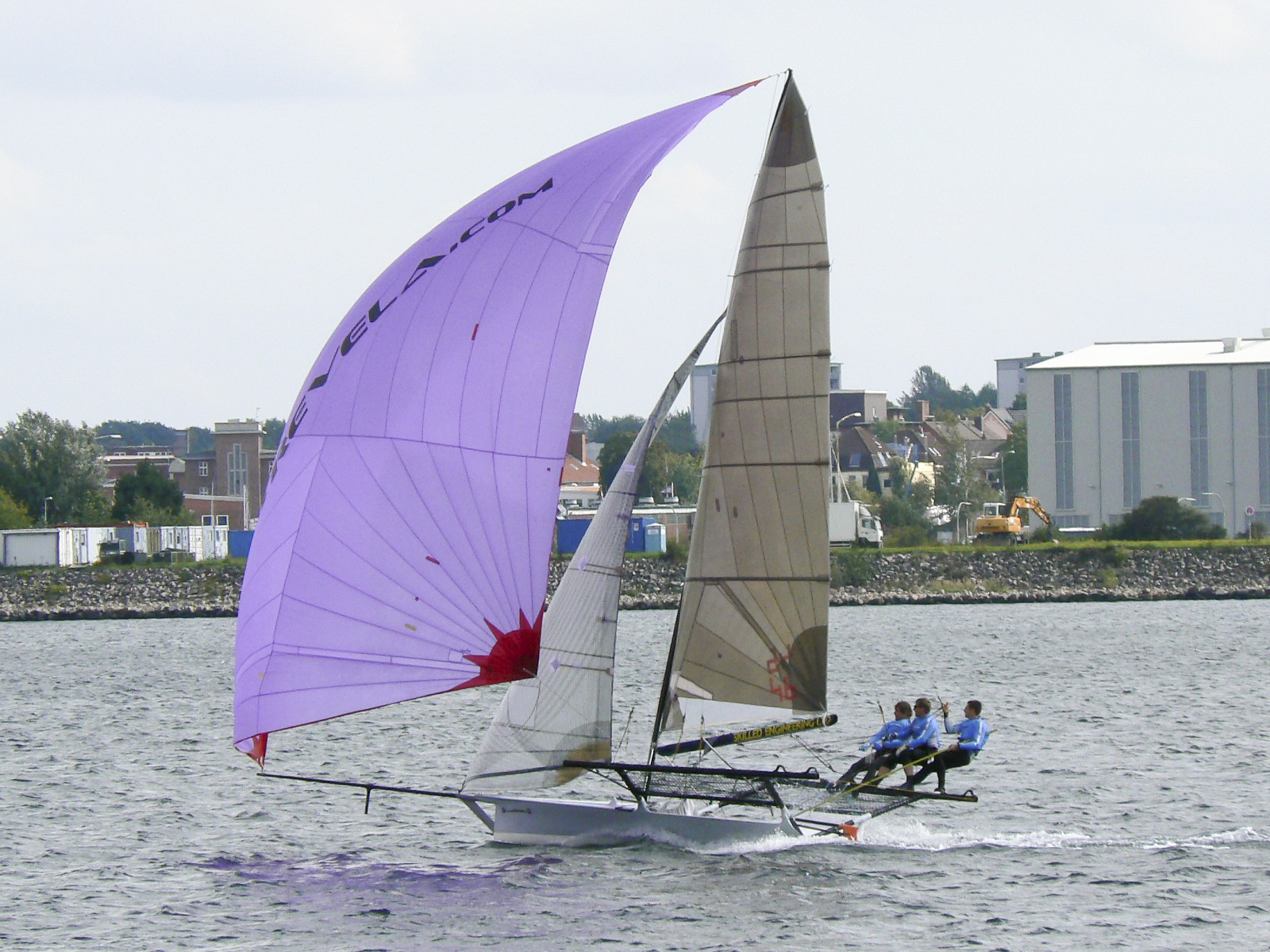
18ft Skiff in Kiel Harbor

High-performance sailing is achieved with low forward surface resistance—encountered by catamarans, sailing hydrofoils, iceboats or land sailing craft—as the sailing craft obtains motive power with its sails or aerofoils at speeds that are often faster than the wind on both upwind and downwind points of sail. Faster-than-the-wind sailing means that the apparent wind angle experienced on the moving craft is always ahead of the sail. This has generated a new concept of sailing, called "apparent wind sailing", which entails a new skill set for its practitioners, including tacking on downwind points of sail.

== History ==
Frank Bethwaite offers the following chronology of key advances in sailing technology that provided the essential elements of high-performance sailing:

- 1900s: Moveable ballast and planing hulls were emerging.
- 1960s: Flexible masts, sail-shaping controls, and knowledge of exploiting wind shifts in racing were developed.
- 1970s: Powerful rigs, including wingsails, offset by the crew trapezing from racks or wings allowed sailing faster than the wind and downwind tacking.

== High-performance sailing craft ==
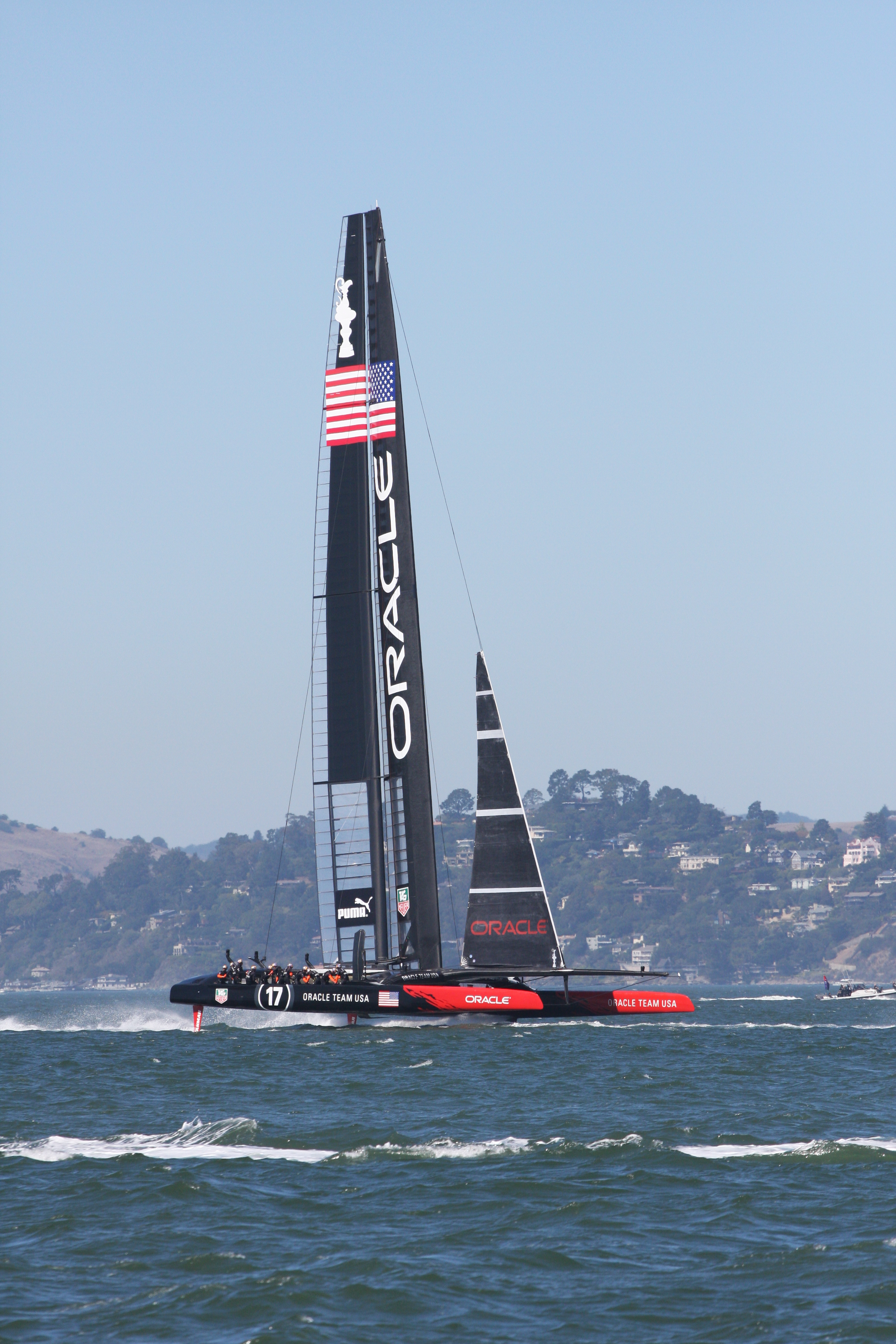
Oracle sailing hydrofoil catamaran with wingsail in the 2013 America's Cup

High-performance watercraft that can exceed the speed of the true wind include sailing catamarans and foiling sailing craft. Ice boats and land-sailing craft are often able to do so. There are also wind-powered vehicles that can travel faster than the wind, such as the rotor-powered Blackbird, which are outside the scope of this article.

=== Skiffs ===
Starting ca. 1975, 18ft Skiffs were sailing downwind faster than the speed of the wind. This meant that they had to tack, rather than jibe to change tacks. Other skiffs that can sail faster than the wind include the 29er, and 49er, both designed by Julian Bethwaite.

=== Multihulls ===
In 2013, a new class of catamaran was announced for the America's Cup which can achieve well in excess of double the speed of the wind. The catamarans used for the 2013 America's Cup were expected to sail upwind at 1.2 times the speed of the true wind, and downwind at 1.6 times the speed of the true wind. They proved to be faster, averaging about 1.8 times the speed of the wind with peaks slightly over 2.0.

The Extreme 40 catamaran can sail at 35 knots (65 km/h; 40 mph) in 20–25-knot (37–46 km/h; 23–29 mph) winds. The high-performance International C-Class Catamaran can sail at twice the speed of the wind.

=== Hydrofoils ===
There are many varieties of sailing hydrofoils. Monohull examples include the International Moth, Laser, and AC75. America's Cup catamarans have used hydrofoils since 2013. Other foiling catamarans include A-Class, C-Class, Nacra 17, Nacra F20, and GC32.

In 2009, hydrofoil trimaran, Hydroptère, set the world speed sailing record on water at 50.17 knots (92.9 km/h), sailing at about 1.7 times the speed of the wind. In late 2012, Vestas Sailrocket 2 achieved a new outright world speed record of 65.45 knots (121.2 km/h) on water, at around 2.5 times the speed of the wind.

=== Iceboats ===
Iceboats on the Hudson River of New York in the second half of the 19th century were as long as 69 feet (21 m) and sailed as fast as 107 miles per hour (172 km/h), a record exceeding any other conveyance in 1885, set by the Icicle. Iceboats designs dating from the mid 20th century onwards typically consist of a triangular or cross-shaped frame, supported by three skate blades called "runners", with the steering runner in front. Runners are made of iron or steel with sharpened edges, which hold onto the ice, preventing slippage sideways from the lateral force of the wind in the sails, as they develop propulsive lift. Given their low forward resistance, iceboats can typically sail at five to six times the speed of the wind. Classic iceboats and Skeeters have reached speeds of 100–150 miles per hour (160–240 km/h). Record speeds are for a Skeeter: Das Boot, 155.9 miles per hour (250.9 km/h) and for a classic iceboat: Debutaunte, 143 miles per hour (230 km/h).

=== Land-sailing craft ===
By sailing downwind at 135° off the wind, a land-sailing craft can sail much faster than the wind. The velocity made good downwind is often over twice as fast compared to the same craft sailing directly downwind. In 2009, the world land speed record for a wind-powered vehicle was set by the sailing craft, Greenbird, sailing at about three times the speed of the wind with a recorded top speed of 202.9 kilometres per hour (126.1 mph).

Other high-performance sailing craft

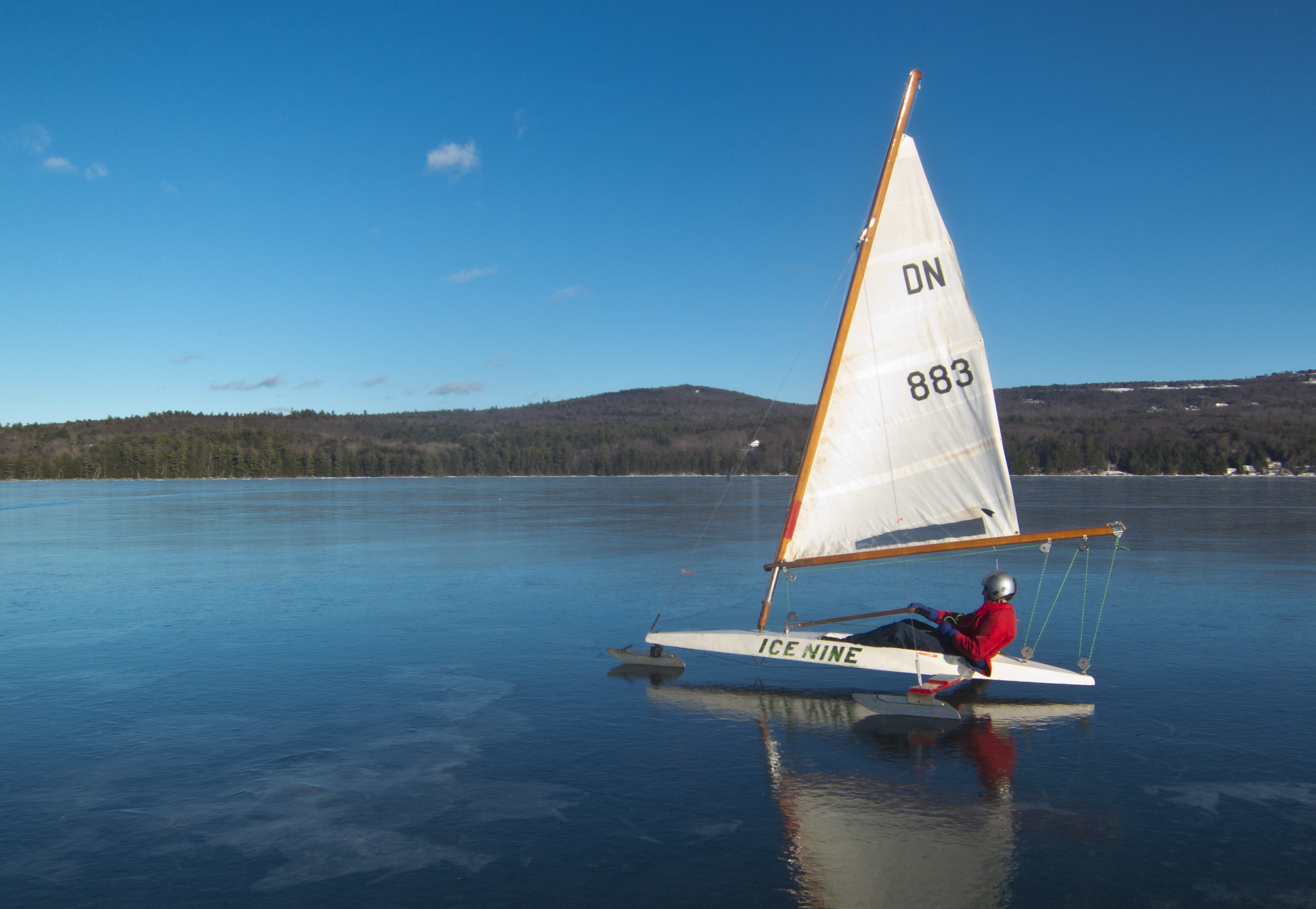
DN class ice boat

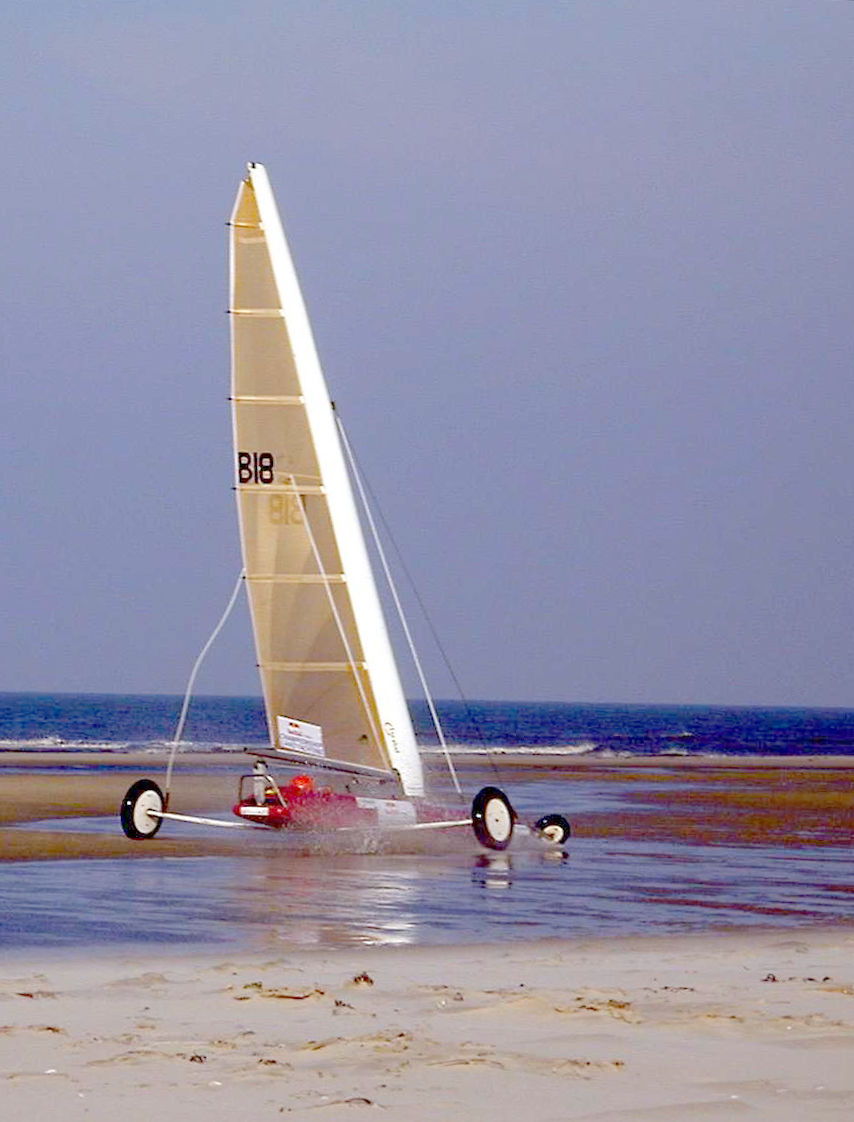
Land-sailing craft

== Apparent wind sailing ==
Whereas iceboats have been able to exceed the speed of the wind, both upwind and downwind for a century, this capability only became routine with the evolution of 18ft Skiffs in the third quarter of the 20th century when their speed tripled from that of the 1950s. Craft that sail faster than the speed of the wind, downwind as well as upwind, are capable of tacking downwind because the apparent wind is always ahead of the mast. This led to the concept of "apparent wind sailing".

=== Apparent wind ===
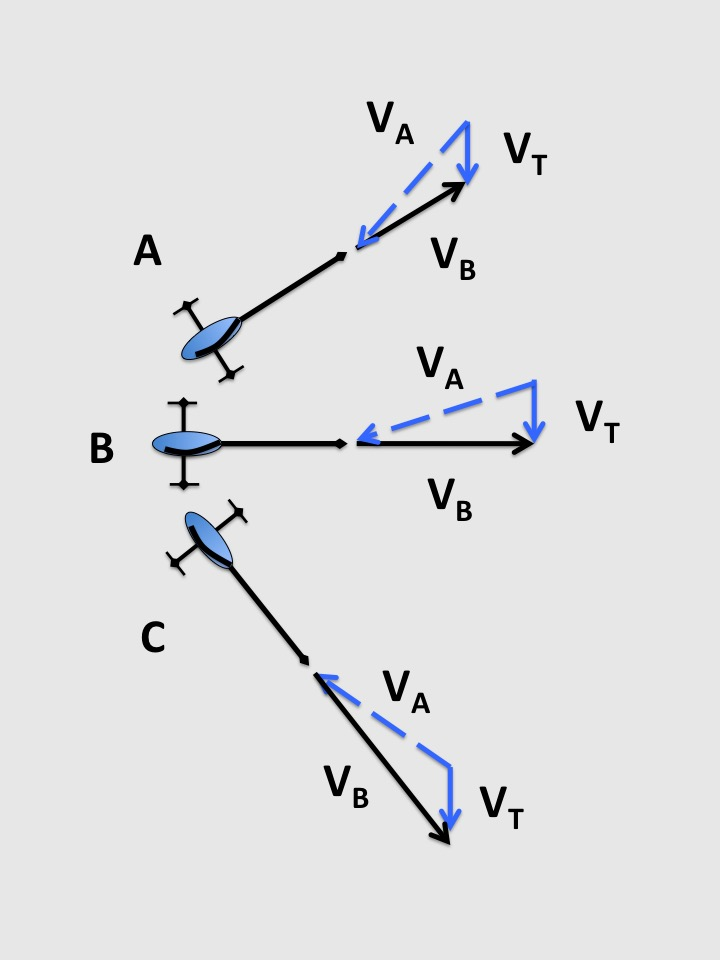
Apparent wind, V_{A}, on an iceboat: As the iceboat sails further from the wind, the apparent wind increases slightly and the boat speed is highest on the broad reach (C). Because of a small β, the sail is sheeted in for all three points of sail.

Apparent wind is the wind velocity (direction and speed), V_{A}, measured aboard a moving sailing craft; it is the net effect (vector sum) of the boat wind, V_{B}—the air flow over the craft induced by its speed over the earth (equal to in magnitude, but opposite in direction to the craft's speed)—and the true wind, V_{T}. The apparent wind measured aboard a craft under power, traveling in calm conditions, V_{T} = 0 knots, would come from directly ahead and at a speed that is the same as the boat speed over the bottom (V_{A} = V_{B} + 0 = V_{B}). If the craft travels at V_{B} = 10 knots with a tailwind of V_{T} = -5 knots, it experiences an apparent wind of V_{A} = 5 knots directly on the bow (V_{A} = V_{B} + V_{T} = 10 − 5). The apparent wind experienced by a stationary craft is the true wind speed. If a craft proceeds at 90° to a true wind of V_{T} = 10 knots, itself traveling at a speed inducing V_{B} = 10 knots, then the apparent wind angle would be 45° off the bow and the apparent wind speed would be about 14 knots, calculated as: square root [(V_{B} )^{2} + (V_{T} )^{2}] = square root [10^{2} + 10^{2}] = 14.14. As the craft becomes faster than the true wind, the apparent wind is always ahead of the sail.

When drag angle of the hull is negligible, the formulas for calculating V_{A} and β (the apparent wind angle) are:

- V_{A} = square root {[V_{T} cos (90° – true wind angle)]^{2} + [V_{T} sin (90° – true wind angle) + V_{B}]^{2}}
- β = 90° – arctan {[V_{T} sin (90° – true wind angle) + V_{B}] / [V_{T} cos (90° – true wind angle)]}

==== Sail power ====
A sail generates lift with a forward propulsive component and a sideways component, based on an optimum angle of attack that is constrained by the apparent wind, V_{A}, being forward of and approximately aligned with the sail.

Decomposition of wind force acting on a sail, generating lift.
(F_{T} = Total aerodynamic force, L = Lift
D =Drag, α = angle of attack)

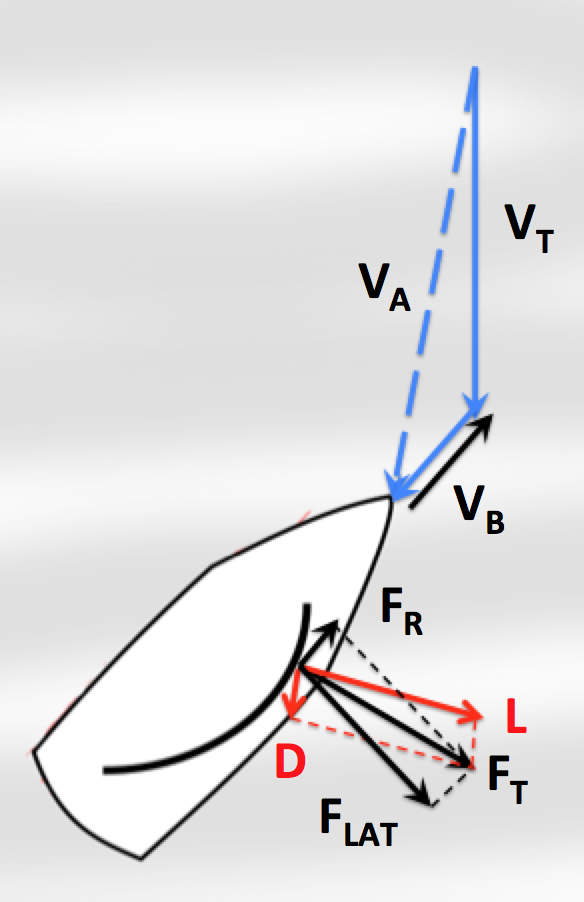
Conversion of lift into propulsion.
(F_{R} = Propulsive force, F_{LAT} = Sideways force)

==== Beta theorem ====
β is the apparent wind angle from course over the water.

Garrett introduces the beta theorem (or course theorem) as a way to understand how apparent wind angle results from the interplay between the driving force from the wind and the resisting force from the water (or hard surface). It is the result of the net effect of two counteracting foils, the sail in the air and the keel in the water. When one resolves the ratio of lift to drag for each in its medium, the resulting motion of the sailing craft resolves to an angle, beta (β), between the apparent wind and the course over the water. The hull (below the water) and the sailing rig (above the water) each have drag angle with respect to the medium flowing past them (water or air), they are λ and α_{m} in the accompanying diagram. The sum of those two drag angles are equal to β, the angle between the apparent wind and the course sailed (β = λ + α_{m}). This theorem applies for every point of sail. A vessel or craft capable of a small β angle denotes high efficiency and a potential for high speed. As forward velocity increases, β becomes smaller. In sailing craft with effective underwater foils the drag angle of the hull, λ, becomes smaller with increased speed. It becomes negligible with hydrofoiling craft, and is essentially nonexistent for ice boats and land sailing craft.

==== Apparent-wind-angle limit ====
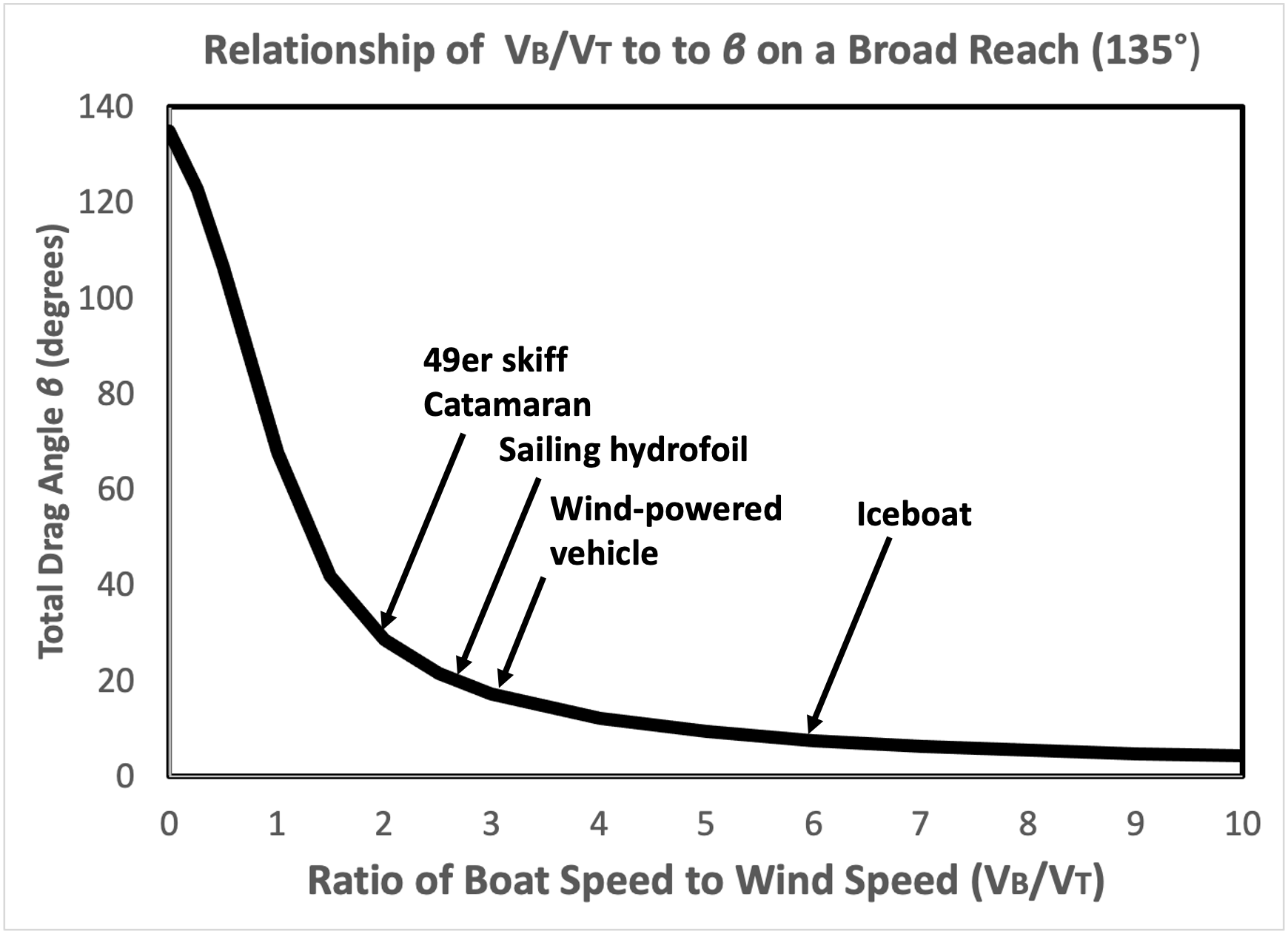
Total drag angle (β ≈ apparent wind angle) for high-performance sailing craft as a ratio of V_{B} to V_{T} at a course of 135° off the wind, achieved by such craft, as shown.

Given an ideal circumstance of a frictionless surface and an airfoil that can develop power, there is no theoretical limit to how fast a sailing craft can travel off the wind as the apparent wind angle becomes ever smaller. In reality, both sail efficiency and friction - between the vessel and the medium it travels on or through - provide an upper limit. Speed is determined by the ratio of power developed by the sail over power lost through various forms of drag (e.g. surface drag and aerodynamic drag). Counter-intuitively, a smaller sail is better at higher speeds. Unfortunately, a small sail diminishes the ability for a craft—even an iceboat—to accelerate to speeds faster than the wind. The principal limit to speed in high-performance sailing craft is form drag. Efforts to overcome this limit is evident in the streamlined hulls of high-performance iceboats and the improvements in drag reduction on planing dinghies. A fast iceboat can achieve an apparent wind of 7.5° and a speed of six times the true wind speed on a course that is 135° off the wind. Bethwaite suggests this might be a practical limit for a craft powered by sails.

=== Points of sail ===
The points of sail at which high-performance sailing craft can achieve highest speeds and achieve the best speed made good over a course span between a beam reach (90° to the true wind) and a broad reach (about 135° away from the true wind). According to Bethwaite, having made comparative measurements in a true wind of 15 knots (28 km/h; 17 mph), a displacement Soling can achieve speeds slightly higher than the true wind and sail 30° off the apparent wind, whereas a planing 18ft Skiff achieves speeds of almost 30 knots (56 km/h; 35 mph) at an apparent wind of 20° and an iceboat can achieve 67 knots (124 km/h; 77 mph) at an apparent wind of 8°.

Under apparent wind sailing, the objective is to keep the apparent wind as far forward as practical for the course sailed in order to attain the fastest course made good to the objective. This requires a craft that can exceed the true windspeed, both upwind and downwind; this allows the apparent wind to remain well ahead of the sail on the courses sailed, the fastest of which are reaches. To be avoided is heading too far downwind, where the apparent wind moves behind the sail and the speed drops below the true windspeed as the course trends from a broad reach to running square (dead down wind).

==== Upwind ====
Depending on the craft sailed, the course made good into the wind may trend away from its closest point into the wind in order to allow the craft to sail at optimum speed. Bethwaite explains that high-speed sailing demands independent action of both the tiller and the mainsheet, whereby the person at the helm avoids responding to gusts and, instead, eases the mainsheet as needed, thus increasing the boat's velocity made good over the previous technique of pointing the craft more into the wind.

==== Off the wind ====
According to Bethwaite, sailing off the true wind at speeds faster than the wind (with the apparent wind forward of the sail) demands a different reaction to gusts than previously employed. Whereas a traditional sailor might reflexively steer into the apparent wind in a gust, the correct response while sailing off wind, faster than the true wind speed is to veer away from the gust, heading more downwind. This has the doubly beneficial effect of relieving the heeling force of the gust and allowing the craft to sail yet faster off the wind.

== See also ==
- Forces on sails
- Wind-powered vehicle
