= Chinese gybe =

Type of jibe on a sailing vessel

A Chinese gybe on a sailing vessel is a type of gybe where the upper section of the main sail moves cross the boat, filling from the opposite side, whilst the lower section and boom remain on the original side of the boat.

A Chinese gybe is usually induced by too little tension on the vang or kicking strap, allowing the boom to rise up and the leech of the sail to twist excessively.

The term can be used in a different sense, in which a Chinese gybe is a gybe caused when a boat rolls excessively to windward (usually when running downwind), causing an unexpected and/or uncontrolled change in course (specifically bearing off dangerously). This sense of the term is similar to death roll.
