= Windmill ship =

Vessel powered by a wind turbine

A windmill ship, wind energy conversion system ship or wind energy harvester ship propels itself by use of a wind turbine to drive a propeller.

They use wind power through a mechanical or electrical transmission to the propeller. Where transmission is electric, storage batteries may also be used to allow power generated at one time to be used for propulsion later on.

Windmill ships should not be confused with rotor ships, which instead rely on the Magnus effect for propulsion.

== Points of sail ==
Equipped with a wind conversion device that can rotate 360° no matter in which direction the ship is heading, a windmill ship can sail in any direction.

- It can move directly upwind, a point of sailing unachievable by other sailing craft. Here a wind turbine powers a water propeller. Because the power produced depends on the apparent wind strength, a large amount of power is transmitted to the propeller. In order to operate efficiently in the typically slow speed through the water, the propeller must be large enough to generate more upwind thrust than the combined downwind force of the wind turbine and the air and water resistances of the ship structure itself.
- With the wind from the side, i.e. on a reach, the wind turbine's thrust pushes the ship sideways, which should therefore have a lateral surface such as a keel in order to reduce leeway. Thus equipped the wind turbine can be also be used in an autogyro mode. That is, no rotary power is transmitted and the wind turbine acts in the same manner as a static sail and the ships's speed could exceed wind speed in the same way as with many other sailing craft.
- Sailing downwind, the apparent wind decreases the more the ship speeds up and at exactly the true wind speed, would drop to zero, so that the wind turbine can generate no power and also no thrust if used in the autogyro mode. Therefore windmill ships are limited to less than wind speed when travelling directly downwind, as with other sailing craft. Theoretically the wind turbine could be used instead as an air propeller and the water propeller as a water turbine. The direction of power is then reversed and such a windmill ship could accelerate through the region of zero apparent wind and exceed the wind speed directly downwind. As this requires both the air and water devices to be constructed differently than usual and extremely low water resistance from the hull, this has not been achieved so far with ships, but has been achieved with land yachts. These travel on wheels which offer very little resistance at high speeds compared to that of even the best hulls through water.

== Types ==
Several types can be made; these include wind-turbine-only ships as well as hybrid ships which store wind power from the turbine when the ship does not need to be propelled. To reduce the energy required to propel the boat, windmill ships are often equipped with low-friction hull designs, such as multihulls, or they are hydrofoils. Boats without low-friction hulls or hydrofoils can be equipped with wind turbines, but often the force generated by the turbines alone is not sufficient to propel the craft. In this case, the turbines only provide supplemental force to conventional sails or other propulsion systems.

At present, research is ongoing and the best types of bladed rotors still need to be determined. For example, high horizontal axis windmills are proven to make the ship less stable. Therefore, vertical axis wind mills (e.g., Savonius turbines) are sometimes preferred. Also, the wind mill needs to be highly durable as marine environments tend to degrade windmills more quickly than what is common on land.

== Current ships ==
Few windmill ships have been built to date; these include:

- Jim Bates' Te whaka
- Lindsay Olen's Thrippence
- Peter Worsley's windmill-driven boat http://www.sailwings.net/rotaryhome.html
- Jim Wilkinson's Revelation 2
- Blackbird (wind-powered vehicle)

The film Waterworld starring Kevin Costner featured a trimaran powered by a vertical-axis Darrieus wind turbine.

== See also ==
- Wind-powered vehicle
