= Velocity made good =

Term in sailing

Velocity made good, or VMG, is a term used in sailing, especially in yacht racing, indicating the speed of a sailboat towards (or from) the direction of the wind. The concept is useful because a sailboat cannot sail directly upwind, and thus often can not, or should not, sail directly to a mark to reach it as quickly as possible. It is also often less than optimal to sail directly downwind.

== Concept ==
Instead of sailing directly toward a windward mark, the helmsman chooses a point of sail towards the direction of the wind that maximizes velocity made good (either towards the destination - or towards better winds). To actually reach a mark, the boat needs to alternate between courses (tacks) where the wind approaches from alternating sides. The helmsman uses VMG to find exactly what the optimum angle against the wind is. At the optimum boat speed and angle to the wind, VMG is maximized, steering closer to the direction of the wind will reduce boat speed, while steering further away from the direction of the wind might give a higher boat speed, but at the cost of a larger deviation in heading, so less progress towards a mark.

For reaching marks that are towards the direction of the wind, sailboats need to alternate between headings, "tacks", where the wind angle towards the wind is on opposite sides of the boat. On a tack, the sailor might start by pointing the sailboat as close into the wind as possible while still keeping the winds blowing across the sails in a manner that provides aerodynamic lift which then propels the boat. The sailor can then turn slightly away from the wind to create more forward wind pressure on the sails and better balance the boat, which allows it to move with greater speed, but less directly toward the wind (or mark).

As an example, assume a boat wants to go north in a wind coming from the north. Assume also on a heading of 60 degrees (NE) the speed of the boat is 5.0 knots. Falling off to 65 degrees NE accelerates the boat to 5.2 knots. Turning up into the wind to a heading of 55 degrees NE causes the boat speed to drop to 4.0 knots. These data indicate the trade-off between speed and progress toward the upwind mark (to the north in this case). Finding the heading that moves the boat most quickly towards the mark requires basic trigonometry. The northward component of the boat's velocity vector is found by multiplying the boat speed (V_{B}) by the cosine of the angle between the true wind direction (north) and the sailboat's heading.

$VMG = V_B \ cos\theta$

Course	SOG	VMG
55	4.0	2.3
60	5.0	2.5
65	5.2	2.2

In this case, the optimal VMG is obtained on a heading of 60 degrees from the true wind (60 degrees NE or 300 degrees NW). Turning up into the wind (more towards the mark) makes less progress towards the mark because the boat slows down too much. Turning downwind speeds up the boat, but yields a course that leads too far away from the mark for the increased speed to be a benefit.

== Confusion with VMC ==
Velocity made good is often confused with velocity made good on course (VMC), and often used interchangeably. VMC is the speed component in the direction of a mark. If the course deviation is $\theta$ and speed over ground $V_o$, the speed component toward a mark:

$VMC, \hat y = V_ocos\theta$

If the course is directly towards a mark, VMC will be identical to speed over ground (SOG). An ordinary GPS unit will, if it indicates a VMG measurement, of necessity be velocity made good on course. Measurement of wind speed and direction, in addition to boat speed and heading, is required to calculate a real VMG reading.

If a mark is exactly currently in the direction of the wind, VMC will be the same as VMG. As the direction towards a mark deviates with the direction of the wind, VMC will deviate from true VMG, and will be less useful to use for the purpose of optimizing sailing performance.
