= Jibe =

Basic sailing maneuver, where ship turns its stern through the wind

Jibing from port tack to starboard tack. Wind shown in red.: 1. Broad reaching on port tack. "Prepare to jibe!"; 2. Bearing away, or turning downwind, and hauling in the sail(s) to begin the jibing maneuver. "Bearing away!"; 3. Heading downwind, the wind catches the other side of the sail and it jibes, then is quickly let out to its new position. "Jibe-ho!"; 4. Steadying up on the new tack.; 5. Broad reaching on starboard tack.

A jibe (US) or gybe (Britain) is a sailing maneuver whereby a sailing craft reaching downwind turns its stern through the wind, which then exerts its force from the opposite side of the vessel. It stands in contrast with tacking, whereby the sailing craft turns its bow through the wind. For square-rigged ships, this maneuver is called wearing ship.

In this maneuver, the mainsail will cross the center of the boat while the jib is pulled to the other side of the boat. If a spinnaker is up, its pole will have to be manually moved to the other side, to remain opposite the mainsail. In a dinghy, raising the centerboard can increase the risk of capsizing during what can be a somewhat violent maneuver, although the opposite is true of a dinghy with a flat, planing hull profile: raising the centerboard reduces heeling moment during the maneuver and so reduces the risk of capsize.

The other way to change the side of the boat that faces the wind is turning the bow of the boat into, and then through, the direction of the wind. This operation is known as tacking or coming about. Tacking more than 180° to avoid a jibe is sometimes referred to as a "chicken jibe".

An uncontrolled, accidental jibe that allows the mainsail boom to swing across the cockpit may endanger crew and rigging. Therefore, accidental jibes are to be avoided while the proper technique must be applied so as to control the maneuver.

== Use ==
Many sailboats move significantly faster when sailing on a broad reach than when running (sailing straight downwind). Thus the increased speed of a zig-zag course, jibing into successive broad reaches, can more than make up for the extra distance such craft take over a straight downwind course. Jibing is also common in racing, which often uses a triangular course marked with buoys; the most direct way of rounding a buoy may be to jibe.

Jibing occurs less commonly than tacking, since a sailboat can sail straight downwind, whereas it cannot sail directly into the wind and has to sail a zig-zag course at alternating angles into the wind. However, a jibe can generally be completed more quickly than a tack because the boat never turns into the wind, and thus a jibing boat's sails are always powered, whereas a tacking boat's luffing sails are un-powered while the bow crosses through or into the direction of the wind.

Wearing ship is the equivalent maneuver for a square-rigged ship when its crew wishes to avoid the difficulties and hazards of tacking. Light winds, heavy seas, worn-out gear, and poor vessel or crew performance are all reasons a ship may choose to wear instead of tack. Compared to boats with a fore-and-aft rig, a square rigger can jibe without any difficulty or risk of accident. However, since these craft cannot point close to the wind, they may find it difficult to maintain turning and forward momentum as the bow passes through the large no-go zone when tacking. If the ship loses steering way, it can be "taken aback", with the wind pressing on the forward surface of the sails and caught in irons. By driving the vessel backwards through the water, this puts excessive strain on the ship's masts, spars and rigging, could break the rudder, and in severe weather could dismast the ship. With tacking to windward carrying these risks, in some situations a ship's master might consider it quicker and safer to travel upwind by executing a series of jibes, turning the vessel across the wind through 270 degrees rather than through the 90 degrees of a tack. This, however, would result in considerable ground lost to leeward with each jibe. Wearing has been judged to be unseamanlike except in heavy weather.

When running (sailing nearly directly downwind) in a sloop, one may "jibe" only the mainsail to the opposite side of the boat. This keeps both the main and jib exposed to the wind resulting in a more efficient use of wind. Setting the mainsail and the jib on opposite sides of the boat is often referred to as running "goose-winged", "gull-winged", or "wing-and-wing". When running wing-and-wing, a light spinnaker pole or whisker pole is often used to hold the clew of the foresail out to the windward side of the boat.

== Dangers ==
A jibe can be dangerous in a fore-and-aft rigged boat because the sails are always completely filled by wind during the maneuver. As the direction of the wind crosses the boat's centerline and the leeward side of the mainsail and boom suddenly become the new windward side the load on the sail and mainsheet remain high; if uncontrolled, they can swing across the deck at high speed, striking and seriously injuring anyone standing in the path of the boom or its tackle. An uncontrolled boom slamming to the limit of its range may also put excessive stress on the rigging, can break the boom or standing rigging, or cause dismasting. A jibe can also result in a sudden change in the direction of heel, and can cause unexpected course changes due to the mainsail force changing from one side of the boat to the other.

== Technique ==
A safe jibe can be aided by tensioning the boom vang (kicking strap) to prevent the boom from lifting. In high winds, sailing nearly directly downwind briefly before and after the jibe and making only small direction changes will produce less heeling force and reduce the tendency to round-up. In heavier gusts, the crew or skipper can sheet the boom in and force the boom across the boat by hand, holding the boom in position by locking the traveler or using a preventer. After the jibe has been completed, the course can then be changed to higher points of sail.

Because of the inherent dangers in jibing, communication among the crew is key. Typically three commands are issued by the helmsman: "Prepare to jibe" (or "ready to jibe") warns everyone to remain clear of the boom and alerts crew to be in position to handle sheets and boom for all sails. "Bearing away" or "jibing" (similar to saying "helm's a-lee" during a tack) indicates the helmsman is turning the boat (away from the wind) to start the jibe. "Jibe-ho" accompanies the start of the boom swing across the centerline.

Accidental jibes may occur when running dead downwind and the wind catches the leeward side of the sail. When the wind direction crosses the centerline of the boat without jibing the point of sail is referred to as "by the lee". When sailing "by the lee" the outer edge of the mainsail is facing slightly into the wind. Rolling motion, slight changes in the boat heading or wind direction can cause an unexpected and surprising jibe, suddenly and forcefully flipping the mainsail to the opposite side of the boat. Do not sail "by the lee" except for brief durations (such as to avoid an obstacle), and only when keeping all crew clear of the boom swing and the arc of the mainsheet sweep. A crew member can be used to help hold the boom in place in smaller boats. When sailing directly downwind, unintentional jibes can also occur; diligent helmsmanship is required to prevent "by the lee" conditions and keeping clear of the boom sweep is advised. In larger stable boats, a preventer can help by keeping the boom held forward, preventing the boom motion of a jibe, especially in light winds. However, in high winds, the "sheeting in action" of a preventer can cause severe rounding up on the other tack. Smaller boats may find that a backwinded sail is more heel inducing than allowing a jibe. See broach, Chinese gybe and death roll.

When sailing in high winds, a small boat or dinghy can capsize shortly after a jibe due to helmsman error (loss of direction control, or suddenly rounding into the wind too far) or tripping over the centerboard. It is partly for this second reason that centerboards are often lifted while sailing downwind even in non-planing hulls, the main reason being that a centreboard/keel is not needed for sailing downwind and simply adds to the drag of the hull. Raising the centreboard reduces drag and increases the boat's speed.

As with most sailing training, it is particularly important to learn this maneuver in lighter winds, and practice in increasing winds and faster maneuvers gradually.

== For various sailing craft ==
The method of jibing sailing craft differs, depending on whether they are fore-and aft, square-rigged, a windsurfer, or a kitesurfer.

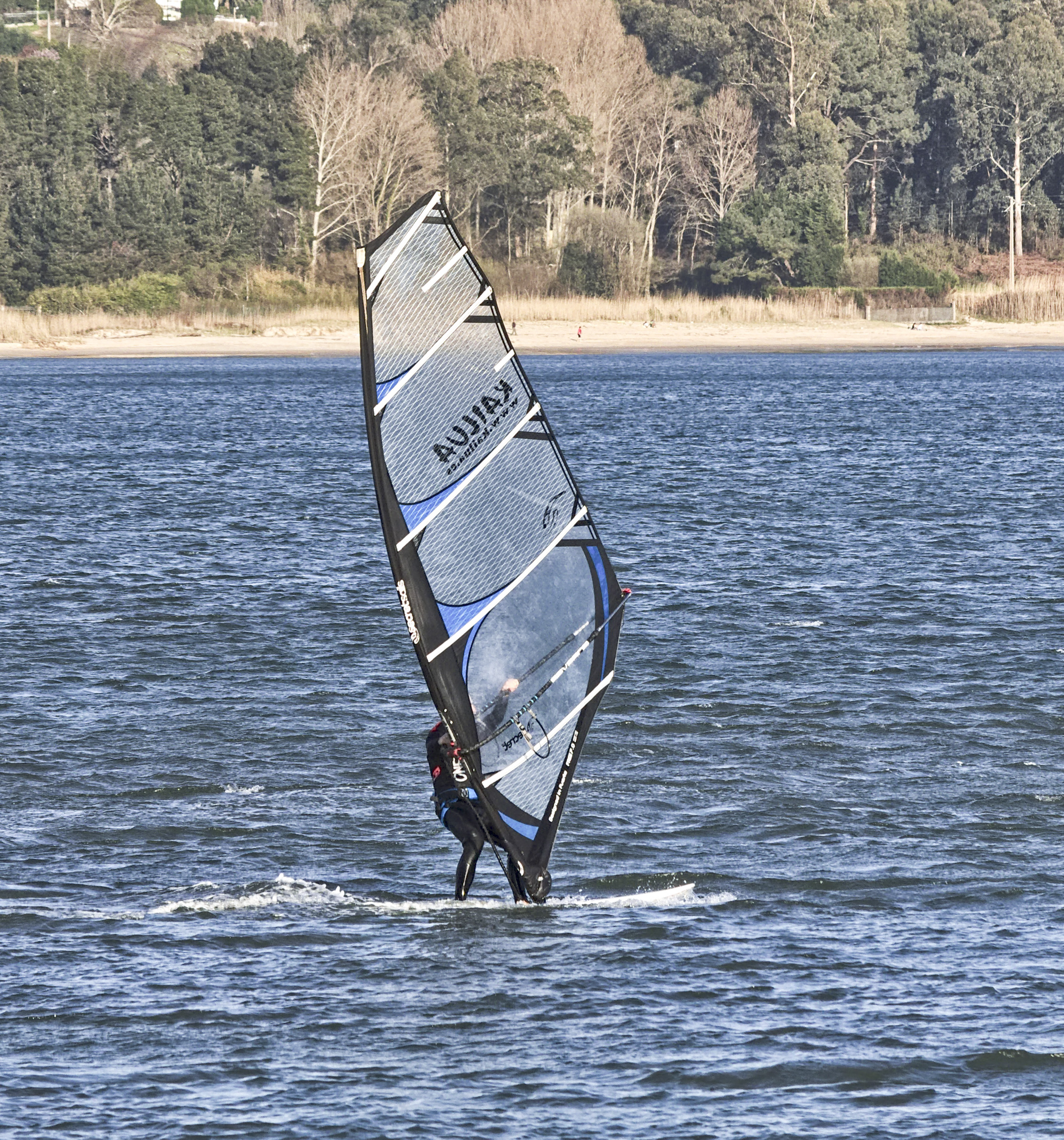
Windsurfer jibing

- Fore-and-aft rig – A fore-and-aft sail is set for the wind on one side for a given tack. As the wind changes across the stern and reaches the other side of the sail, the sail may be blown to the other side suddenly—unless it is shielded by other sails to windward. If the sail is supported with a boom, gaff or sprit the change may be violent—unless the sheets are tight—as the sail is blown to the other side. For a jib, the old leeward sheet is loosened as the stern turns through the wind and the old windward sheet is tightened as the new leeward sheet to allow the sail to draw wind. A jib is usually shielded by the mainsail in this process. The mainsail sheet is tightened to limit the sudden movement from one side to the other and then eased out, once the boat is safely on the opposite tack. On smaller craft, the boom may be controlled by hand.
- Spinnaker – Some sailboats use a symmetrical spinnaker—a three-sided, parachute-like sail—off the wind. The windward lower corner of a spinnaker is attached to a horizontal pole, coming from the mast to the lower corner of the sail—controlled by a line, called a guy—and the other lower corner is attached to a line that acts as a sheet. When jibing, the pole is disconnected from the mast and attached to the opposite lower corner. Upon establishment on the new tack, the end of the pole that was on the sail is connected to the mast as the former guy becomes the new sheet and the former sheet becomes the new guy. For high-performance craft with an asymmetrical spinnaker attached to a bow sprit, the sail is jibed in a manner similar to a jib.
- Square rig – As with any downwind change of course, the sails on a square rigger are adjusted with the vessel's running rigging, using braces sheets. Only the jibs, staysails and the spanker need to be jibed, as on a fore-and-aft rig. The maneuver of changing tack with the wind passing across the stern of a square-rigged vessel is called wearing ship.
- Windsurfer rig – When sailors of windsurfers jibe, they use techniques like the carve jibe and the duck jibe or sail back winded then push the leech through the eye of the wind as in an upwind 360 or after ducking the sail to back winded. The carve jibe allows the sail to pivot away from the wind as the board is turned with the wind passing over the stern. A duck jibe is initiated on a beam reach and the sailor presses the sail towards the wind and passes the back end of the boom over to the other side, "ducking" under it.
- Kitesurfer rig – When changing tack while on a broad reach, a kitesurfer again rotates the kite to align with the new apparent wind as the board changes course with the stern through the eye of the wind while planing.

== See also ==
- Tack
- Preventer
- Points of sail
