= Blackbird (wind-powered vehicle) =

Experimental wind-powered vehicle

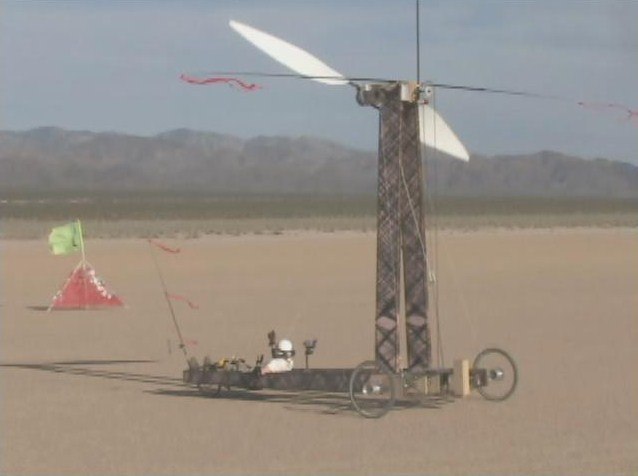
Blackbird traveling downwind faster than the wind, as shown by the streamers on the vehicle and the flag on the ground, pointing in opposite directions.

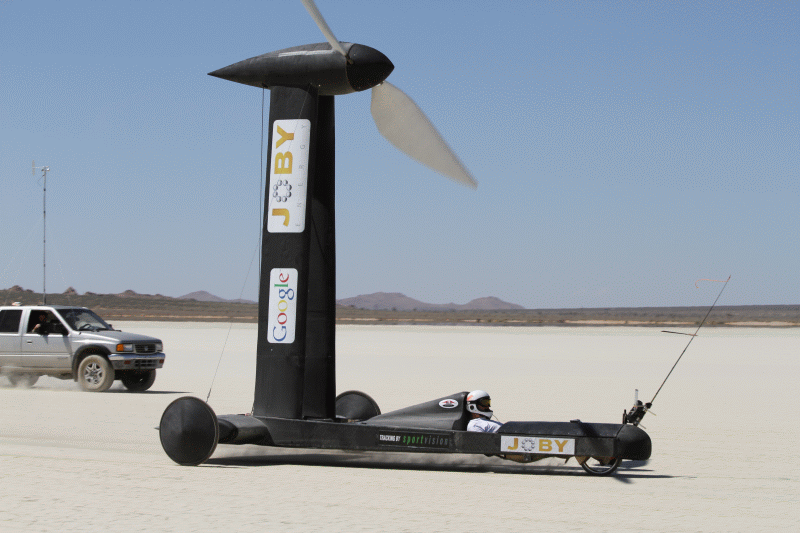
Blackbird with fairings to improve performance.

Blackbird is an experimental wind-powered vehicle, built in 2010 to demonstrate that it is possible for such a vehicle to go directly downwind faster than the wind (sometimes abbreviated as DDWFTTW). Blackbird employs a rotor connected to the wheels and does not have a motor, battery, or flywheel. It was constructed by Rick Cavallaro and John Borton of Sportvision, sponsored by Google and Joby Energy in association with the San Jose State University aeronautics department.

In a test supervised and recognized by the North American Land Sailing Association in July 2010, Cavallaro achieved a speed of 27.7 mph (44.6 km/h) sailing directly downwind in 10 mph (16 km/h) winds: almost three times the speed of the wind. In 2012, Blackbird also demonstrated sailing directly upwind with twice the speed of the wind.

== Theory ==
Rotor-powered vehicles are wind-powered vehicles that use rotors—instead of sails—which may have a shroud around them (ducted fan) or constitute an unducted propeller, and which may adjust orientation to face the apparent wind. The rotor may be connected via a drive train to wheels or to a generator that provides electrical power to electric motors that drive the wheels.

A vehicle with a bladed rotor mechanically connected to the wheels can be designed to go at a speed faster than that of the wind, both directly into the wind and directly downwind. Upwind, the rotor works as a wind turbine driving the wheels. Downwind, it works as a propeller, driven by the wheels. In both cases, power comes from the difference in velocity between the air mass and the ground, as received by the vehicle's rotor or wheels.

Relative to the vehicle, both the air and the ground are passing backwards. However, travelling upwind, the air is coming at the vehicle faster than the ground, whereas travelling downwind faster than the wind speed, the air is coming at the vehicle more slowly than the ground. The vehicle draws power from the faster of the two media in each case and imparts it to the slower of the two: upwind, drawing power from the wind and imparting it to the wheels and, downwind, drawing power from the wheels and imparting it to the rotor: in each case in proportion to the velocity of the medium, relative to the vehicle.

In summary:

- Upwind: the rotor harvests power from the oncoming air and drives the wheels, as would a wind turbine.
- Downwind: when the vehicle is traveling faster than the windspeed, the ground is the fastest-moving medium relative to the vehicle, so the wheels harvest the power and impart it to the rotor, which propels the vehicle.

How fast a given wind speed can propel a vehicle in either direction is limited only by the efficiency of the turbine blades, losses in the drive train, and the vehicle's aerodynamic drag, apart from the drag of the turbine.

== History ==
In 2006, following a viral internet debate started by Rick Cavallaro as a brain teaser, a wind-powered, propeller-driven vehicle was built and filmed, demonstrating that it is possible to sail 'dead' downwind faster than the wind by the power of the available wind only.

In 2009, professor Drela of MIT worked out the equations for such a device and concluded that one could be built "without too much difficulty". Other researchers arrived at similar conclusions.

The same year, team members Rick Cavallaro and John Borton of Sportvision, sponsored by Google and in association with the San Jose State University aeronautics department, built a test vehicle nicknamed Blackbird. A year later, in 2010, Cavallaro successfully tested the vehicle, achieving more than twice the speed of wind, definitively demonstrating that it is possible to build a vehicle which can achieve the claim. A second test with an improved vehicle in 2011 reached close to three times the speed of wind.

After proposing the vehicle's design, and presenting the analysis to demonstrate its viability, the Blackbird team learned that others had previously conceived and built similar designs: most notably, aerodynamics engineer Andrew B. Bauer, later with the Douglas Aircraft Company, built and demonstrated such a vehicle in 1969, based on an analysis presented in a student's paper from some twenty years earlier.

Bauer reported "a rearward deflection of a foot-long tuft located about 12 feet forward of the propeller plane," indicating that his vehicle went faster than the true wind (the strand would have streamed forward, if the apparent wind was from behind). Several sources of engineering and scientific articles explain the theory and physics of such a device. Besides still photography, a film has been found showing it in operation.

== Achievements ==
On 7 and 8 March 2010, the team reported testing their vehicle on a motor-driven moving belt (treadmill), showing that it would advance against the belt, which means that it can progress dead downwind faster than the wind.

On 24 March 2010, the team ran the vehicle on the Ivanpah dry lake bed south of Las Vegas, Nevada, showing that it could accelerate dead downwind from a standstill and reach velocities well in excess of wind speed. That is, the vehicle was progressing dead downwind faster than the wind. Officials of the North American Land Sailing Association (NALSA) were in attendance and one NALSA Board of Directors member (Bob Dill) was there for every run and collected his own rough wind and GPS data.

On July 2, 2010, Blackbird set the world's first certified record for going directly downwind, faster than the wind, using only power from the available wind during its run on El Mirage Dry Lake. The yacht achieved a dead downwind speed of about 2.8 times the speed of the wind.

On June 16, 2012, Blackbird set the world's first certified record for going directly upwind, without tacking, using only power from the wind. The yacht achieved a dead upwind speed of about 2.1 times the speed of the wind.

== Controversy ==
In 2021, University of California, Los Angeles physics professor Alexander Kusenko disputed the claim citing the role of possible wind gusts and other factors in the apparent accomplishment, having seen a YouTube video on the Veritasium channel by Derek Muller. Kusenko and Muller entered into a $10,000 bet that required Muller to prove the validity of the claim, which was witnessed by noted science communicators, Neil deGrasse Tyson and Bill Nye. Muller won the bet to Kusenko's satisfaction with a series of model experiments, investigation of the original supporting data of the Blackbird run, and exploration of the supporting equations.

Although Kusenko conceded the bet on a technicality, he stated that he saw no evidence that Blackbird exceeded the speed of the wind, following the given constraints of the experiment.

== Current status ==
In July 2013, Cavallaro sold Blackbird in an eBay auction. It was purchased by Neil Cutcliffe. In May 2023, Cutcliffe donated it to the Castle Air Museum in Atwater, California. Museum curators plan to restore and preserve it as a static display.

== See also ==
- Greenbird – wind-powered vehicle that set 126.1 mph (202.9 km/h) land speed record on March 26, 2009 (not directly downwind)
- List of motorized trikes
