= Point of sail =

Direction of travel under sail relative to true wind direction over surface

Points of sail and approximate apparent wind for a conventional sailboat on starboard tack

A point of sail is a sailing craft's direction of travel under sail in relation to the true wind direction over the surface.

The principal points of sail roughly correspond to 45° segments of a circle, starting with 0° directly into the wind. For many sailing craft 45° on either side of the wind is a no-go zone, where a sail is unable to mobilize power from the wind. Sailing on a course as close to the wind as possible—approximately 45°—is termed beating, a point of sail when the sails are close-hauled. At 90° off the wind, a craft is on a beam reach. The point of sail between beating and a beam reach is called a close reach. At 135° off the wind, a craft is on a broad reach. At 180° off the wind (sailing in the same direction as the wind), a craft is running downwind.

A given point of sail (beating, close reach, beam reach, broad reach, and running downwind) is defined in reference to the true wind—the wind felt by a stationary observer. The motive power, and thus appropriate position of the sails, is determined by the apparent wind: the wind relative to an observer on the sailing craft. The apparent wind is the combined effect of the velocities of the true wind and of the sailing craft.

A sail with the airflow parallel to its surface, while angled into the apparent wind, acts substantially like a wing with lift as a force acting perpendicular to its surface. A sail with the apparent wind perpendicular to its surface, acts substantially like a parachute with the drag on the sail as the dominant force. As a sailing craft transitions from close-hauled to running downwind, the lifting force decreases and the drag force increases. At the same time, the resistance to sidewards motion needed to keep the craft on course also decreases, along with the sideways tipping force.

There is a zone of approximately 45° on either side of the true wind, where a sail cannot generate lift, called the "no-go zone". The angle encompassed by the no-go zone depends on the airfoil efficiency of the craft's sails and the craft's lateral resistance on the surface (from hydrofoils, outriggers, or a keel in the water, runners on ice, or wheels on land). A craft remaining in its no-go zone will slow to a stop—it will be "in irons".

== The points of sail ==
The recognized points of sail are judged relative to the true wind direction. The subcategories of these two situations include:

- Into the wind where a sailing craft is pointed directly upwind in the middle of the no-go zone, where sails cannot generate power.
- Close-hauled means a boat is sailing at the sharpest angle possible toward the wind without entering the no-go zone, where sailing isn't possible.
- Reaching, including:
  - Close reach: between close-hauled and a beam reach.
  - Beam reach: the craft has the true wind at a right angle to its direction (on its beam).
  - Broad reach: the true wind is coming from behind, but not directly behind.
- Running downwind where a craft has the wind coming from directly behind.

A sailboat on three points of sail

The waves give an indication of the true wind direction. The flag gives an indication of apparent wind direction. True wind can also be indicated by a fixed wind indicator (flag, windsock, etc., not attached to the boat or any moving object).
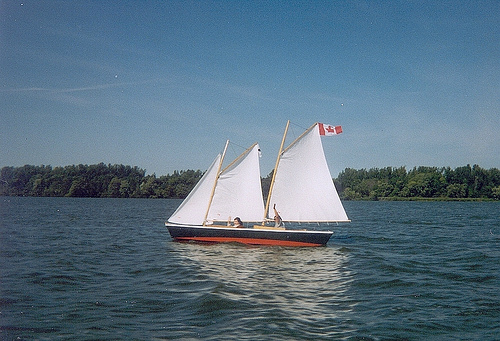
Close-hauled

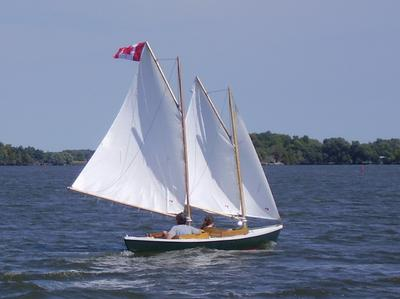
Reaching

Running downwind

=== Into the wind ===
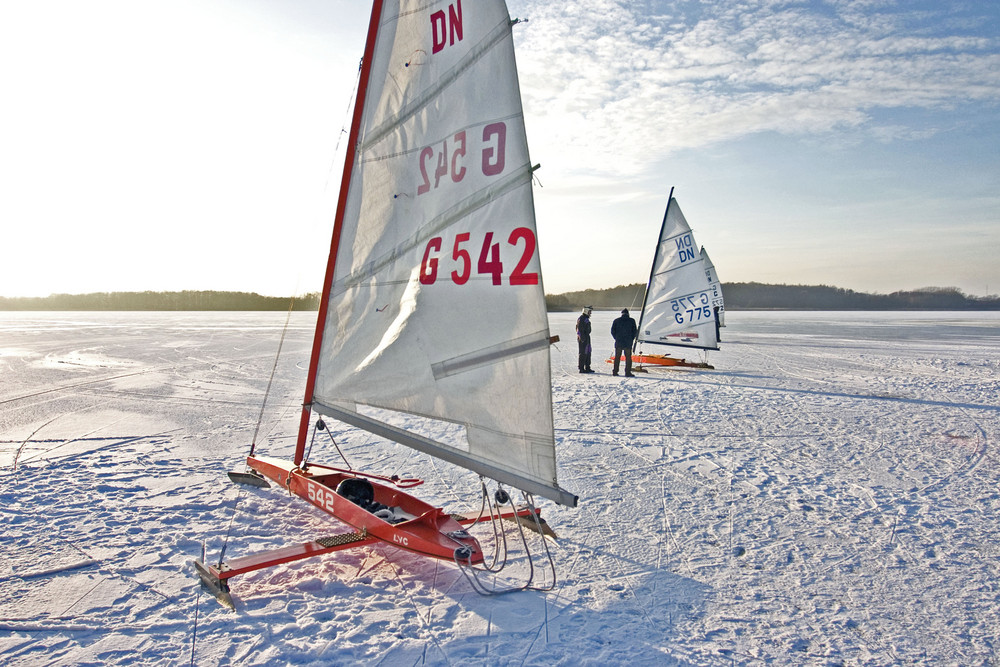
Iceboats parked in irons with sails loose and not generating power, but flapping like a flag.

The range of directions into the wind, where a sailing craft cannot sail is called the no-go zone. A sailing craft cannot sail directly into the wind, nor on a course that is too close to the direction from which the wind is blowing, because the sails cannot generate lift in this no-go zone. A craft passing through the no-go zone to change tacks from one side to the other, must maintain momentum until its sails can draw power on the other side. If it remains in the no-go zone, it will slow to a stop and be in irons. This is called missing stays. To recover, that craft typically must return to its original tack and pick up sufficient speed to complete the maneuver. The span of the no-go zone depends on the efficiency of a sailing craft's sails and its resistance to sideways motion in the water (using a keel or foils) on ice or on land, typically at an angle between 30 and 50 degrees from the wind.

A craft stopped in the no-go zone is said to be in irons. A square-rigged vessel in irons by accident is taken aback with the sails blown against the mast or laid aback if deliberate. In either case, the stopped vessel will be blown backwards, which with proper positioning of the rudder allows the vessel to point outside the no-go zone and resume forward motion, once the sails can draw power. Iceboats are often parked in irons with a brake applied to the ice to prevent motion. To commence sailing, the craft is guided to one side and boarded, once the sail can draw power.

=== Close-hauled ===
A sailing craft is said to be sailing close-hauled when its sails are trimmed in tightly and are acting substantially like a wing, relying on lift to propel the craft forward on a course as close to the wind as the sail can provide lift. This point of sail lets the sailing craft travel upwind, diagonally to the wind direction.

The smaller the angle between the direction of the true wind and the course of the sailing craft, the higher the craft is said to point. A craft that can point higher or sail faster upwind is said to be more weatherly. Pinching occurs as a craft's point of sail approaches the no-go zone and its speed falls off sharply.

==== Sailing to windward ====
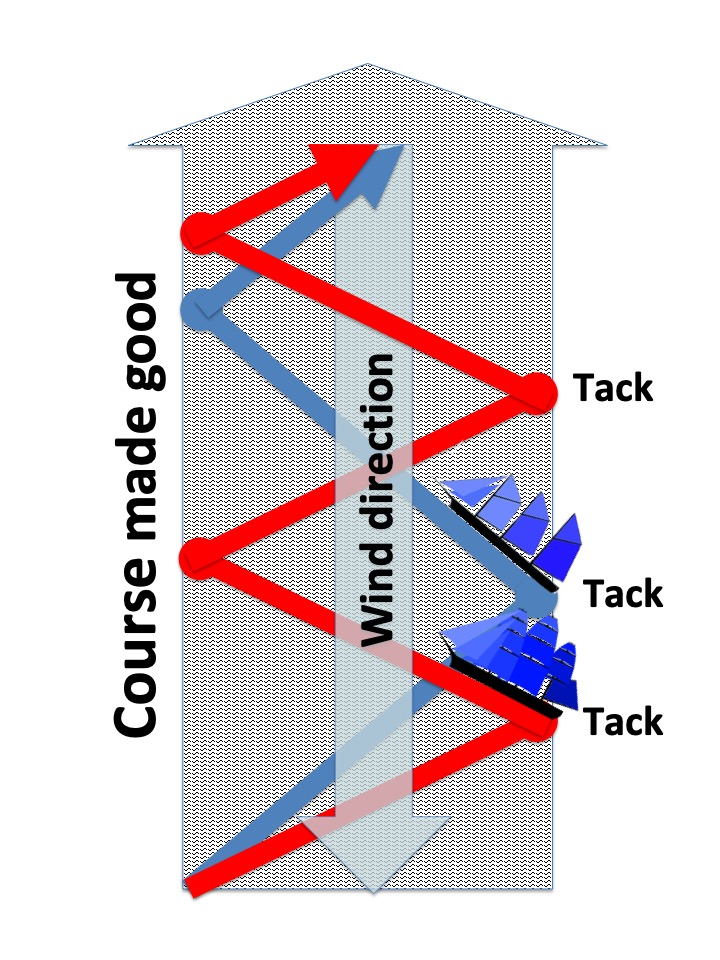
Beating upwind in a more- (blue) and less- (red) weatherly watercraft

In order to sail upwind, sailing craft must zig-zag across the direction of the oncoming wind, called beating to windward. The higher that a vessel can point into the wind, the shorter its "course made good" to an upwind destination. Beating upwind, a vessel alternates between having the wind come on the port and starboard sides (the port and starboard tack). Changing from one tack to the other, by steering through the wind direction, is called tacking, or going about.

=== Reaching ===
A craft sailing with the true wind on its side (within limits) is reaching. Wind is flowing over the surface of the sail, creating lift (like a wing) to propel the craft. Because lift is more powerful than drag on this point of sail, sailing craft achieve their highest speeds on a reach. A variety of high-performance sailing craft sail fastest on a broad reach with the sails close-hauled at speeds several times the true windspeed. Depending on the angle of the true wind with respect to the course sailed, a reach may be close, beam, or broad, as follows:

- A close reach is a course closer to the true wind (more upwindwards) than a beam reach, but below close-hauled; i.e., any angle between a beam reach and close-hauled. The sails are trimmed in (hauled towards the centreline of the hull), but not as tightly as for a close-hauled course.
- A beam reach is when the true wind is at a right angle to the direction of motion (so called because the wind is parallel to the cross-hull beams, if any; see beam).
- A broad reach is when the wind is coming from behind the sailing craft at an angle. This represents a range of wind angles, between a beam reach and running downwind (see next paragraph). On a sailboat (but not an iceboat) the sails are eased out away from the sailing craft, but not as much as on a downwind run. If the sailcraft points any further downwind, the sails cease acting substantially like a wing.

=== Running downwind ===
Sailing with the wind or running before the wind, the sails generate power primarily through drag (like a parachute) with the true wind directly from behind the sailing craft. A sailing craft running more downwind than a broad reach cannot attain a speed faster than the true wind.

However, higher-performance sailing craft achieve a higher velocity made good downwind, by sailing on whatever broad reach is most efficient on that particular craft, and jibing as needed. The longer course is offset by the faster speed. For instance, if a vessel sails alternately in the directions 45° from the downwind direction, it will sail √2 (≈1.4) times farther than it would if it sailed dead downwind. However, as long as it can sail faster than 1.4 times its dead downwind speed, the indirect route will allow it to arrive at a chosen point sooner.

Craft running downwind increase power from the sails by increasing total area presented to the following wind, sometimes by putting out sails that adapt well to the purpose, such as a spinnaker on a fore-and-aft rigged vessel. Another technique is to place the jib to windward (opposite to the main sail)—called "wing on wing" or one of several other terms—for a fore-and-aft vessel going dead downwind. In light winds, certain square-rigged vessels may set studding sails, sails that extend outwards from the yardarms, to create a larger sail area for points of sail, ranging from downwind to a close reach.

Downwind

Sails for a fore-and-aft rig and a square rig in use downwind

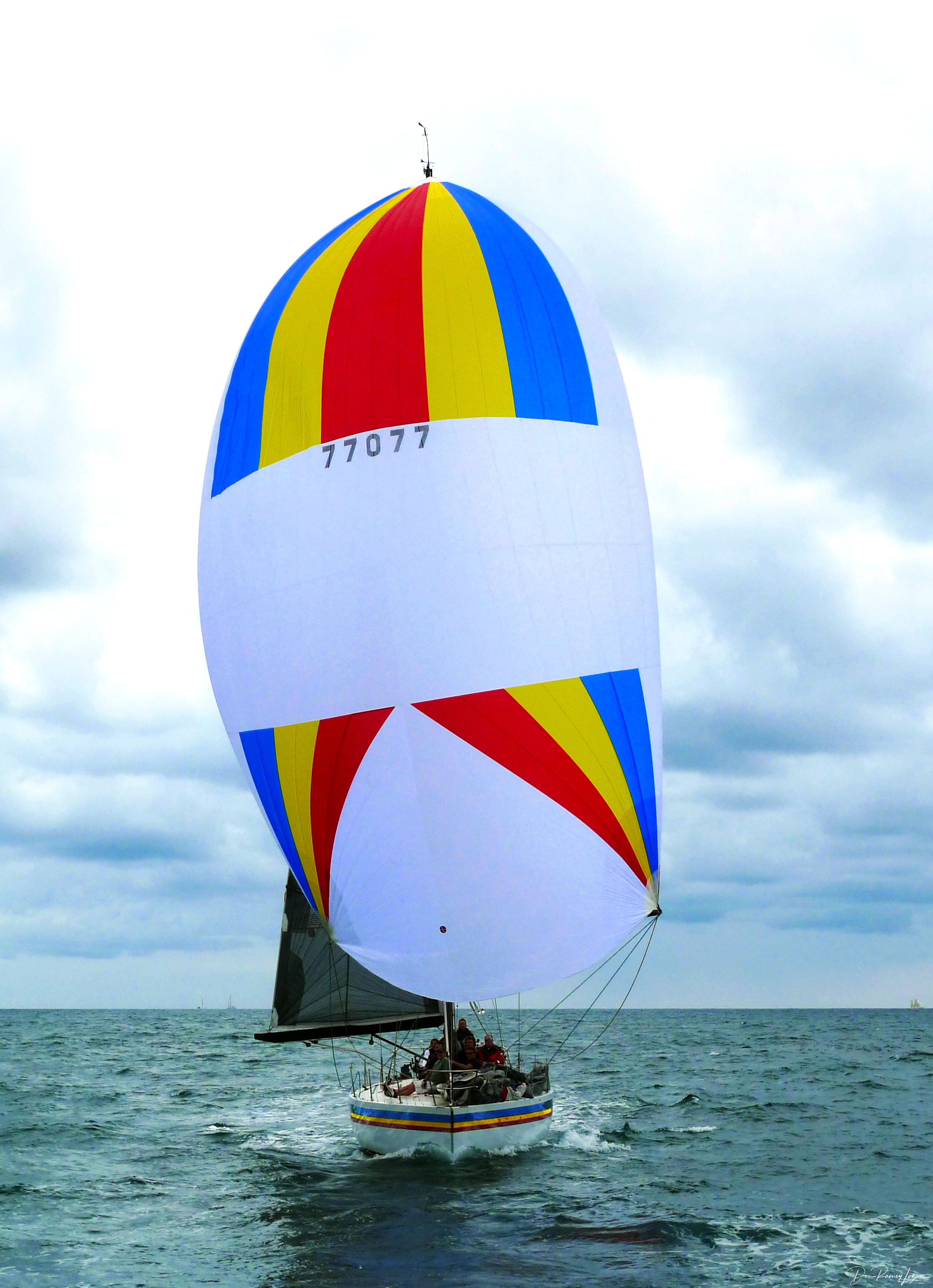
Spinnaker

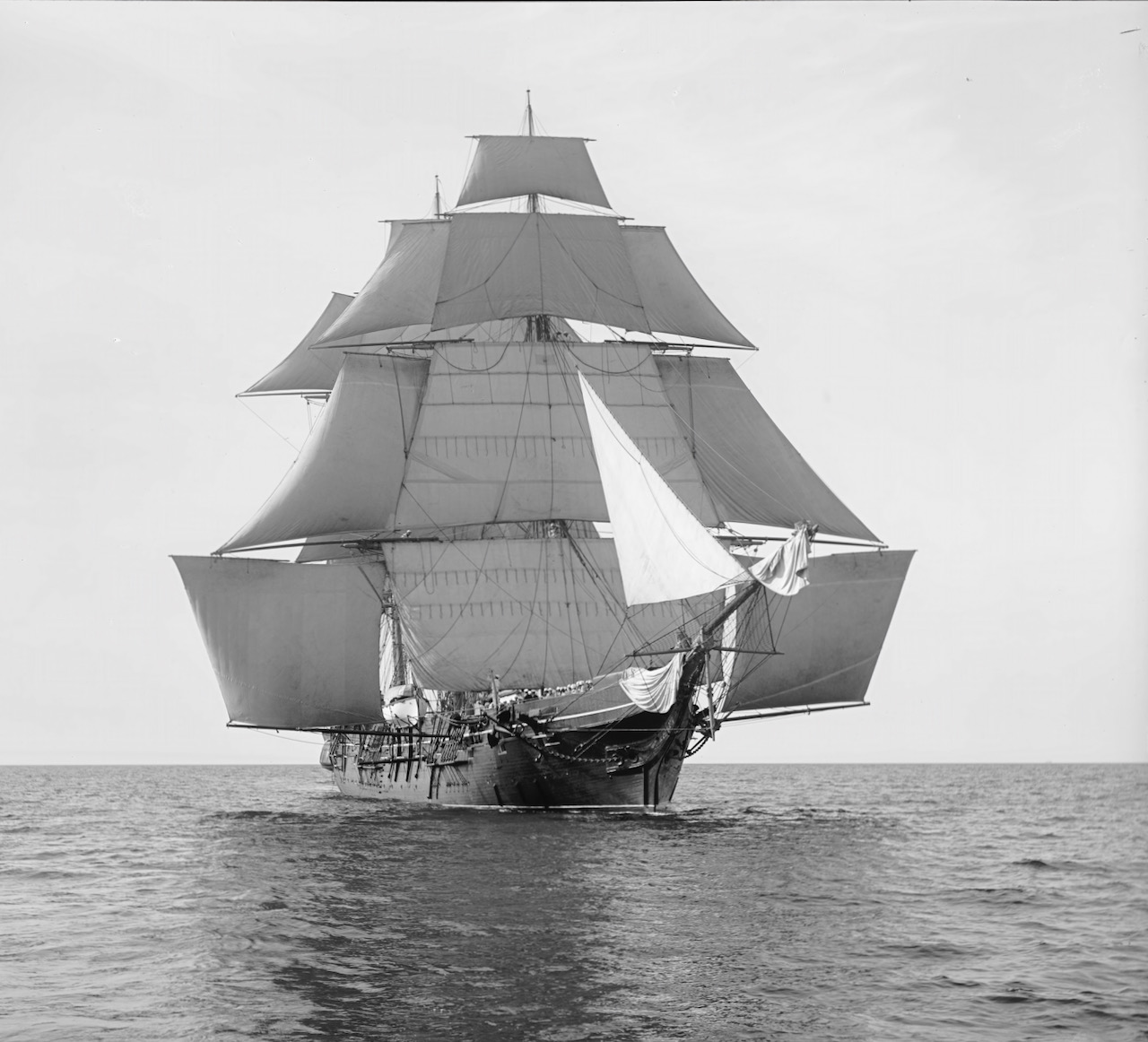
Studding sails

== True wind versus apparent wind ==
True wind (V_{T}) combines with the sailing craft's velocity (V_{B}) to be the apparent wind velocity (V_{A}); the air velocity experienced by instrumentation or crew on a moving sailing craft. Apparent wind velocity provides the motive power for the sails on any given point of sail. The apparent wind is equal to the true wind velocity for a stopped craft; it may be faster than the true wind speed on some points of sail, or it may be slower e.g. when a sailing craft sails dead downwind.

Effect of apparent wind on sailing craft at three points of sail

Sailing craft A is close-hauled. Sailing craft B is on a beam reach. Sailing craft C is on a broad reach.
Boat velocity (in black) generates an equal and opposite apparent wind component (not shown), which adds to the true wind to become apparent wind.

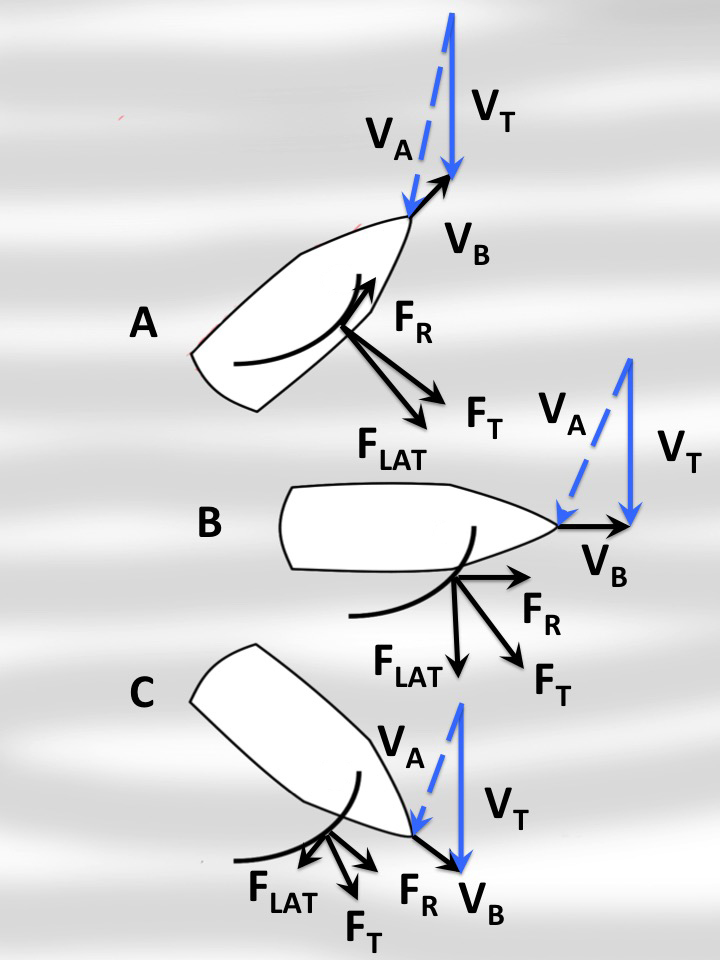
Apparent wind and forces on a sailboat.
As the boat sails further from the wind, the apparent wind becomes smaller and the lateral component becomes less; boat speed is highest on the beam reach.

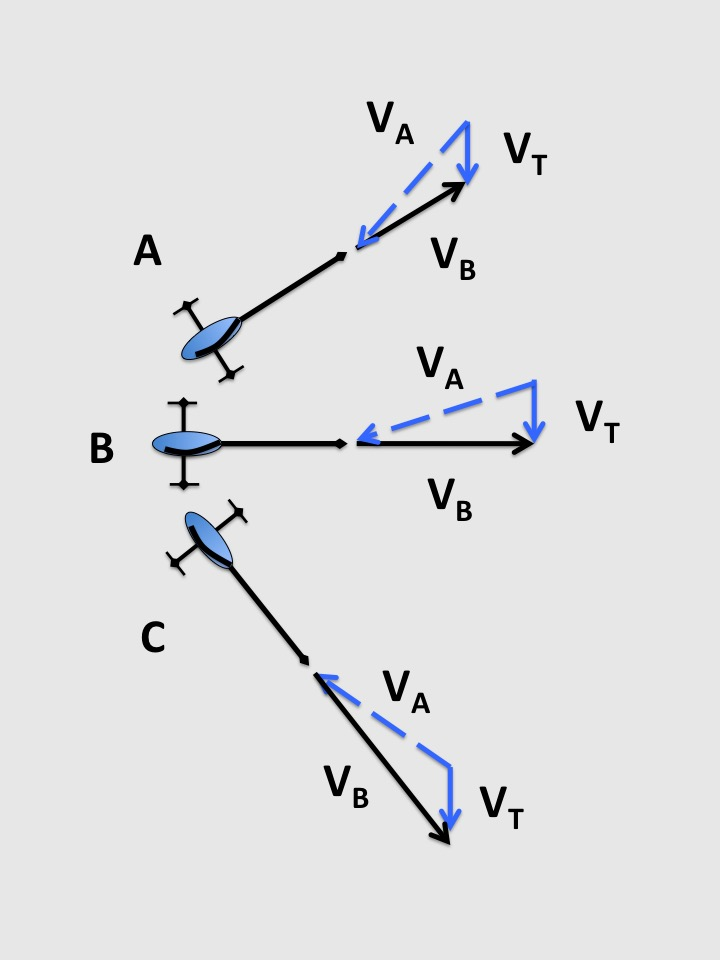
Apparent wind on an iceboat.
As the iceboat sails further from the wind, the apparent wind increases slightly and the boat speed is highest on the broad reach. The sail is sheeted in for all three points of sail.

The speed of sailboats through the water is limited by the resistance that results from hull drag in the water. Ice boats typically have the least resistance to forward motion of any sailing craft; consequently, a sailboat experiences a wider range of apparent wind angles than does an ice boat, whose speed is typically great enough to have the apparent wind coming from a few degrees to one side of its course, necessitating sailing with the sail sheeted in for most points of sail. On conventional sail boats, the sails are set to create lift for those points of sail where it's possible to align the leading edge of the sail with the apparent wind.

For a sailboat, point of sail significantly affects the lateral force to which the boat is subjected. The higher the boat points into the wind, the stronger the lateral force, which results in both increased leeway and heeling. Leeway, the effect of the boat moving sideways through the water, can be counteracted by a keel or other underwater foils, including daggerboard, centerboard, skeg and rudder. Lateral force also induces heeling in a sailboat, which is resisted by the shape and configuration of the hull (or hulls, in the case of catamarans) and the weight of ballast, and can be further resisted by the weight of the crew. As the boat points off the wind, lateral force and the forces required to resist it become reduced. On ice boats and sand yachts, lateral forces are countered by the lateral resistance of the blades on ice or of the wheels on sand, and of their distance apart, which generally prevents heeling.

== See also ==
- Glossary of nautical terms (A-L)
- Glossary of nautical terms (M-Z)
- Sailing
- Tacking (sailing), turning so that the bow briefly points dead upwind
- Gybing, turning so that the bow briefly points dead downwind

== Bibliography ==
- Rousmaniere, John, The Annapolis Book of Seamanship, Simon & Schuster, 1999
- Chapman Book of Piloting (various contributors), Hearst Corporation, 1999
- Herreshoff, Halsey (consulting editor), The Sailor’s Handbook, Little Brown and Company, 1983
- Seidman, David, The Complete Sailor, International Marine, 1995
- Jobson, Gary, Sailing Fundamentals, Simon & Schuster, 1987
