= Forces on sails =

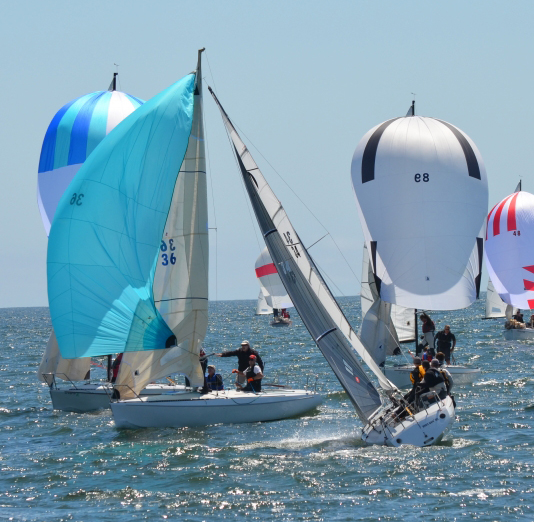
Aerodynamic force components for two points of sail. Left-hand boat: Down wind with stalled airflow— predominant drag component propels the boat with little heeling moment. Right-hand boat: Up wind (close-hauled) with attached airflow—predominant lift component both propels the boat and contributes to heel.

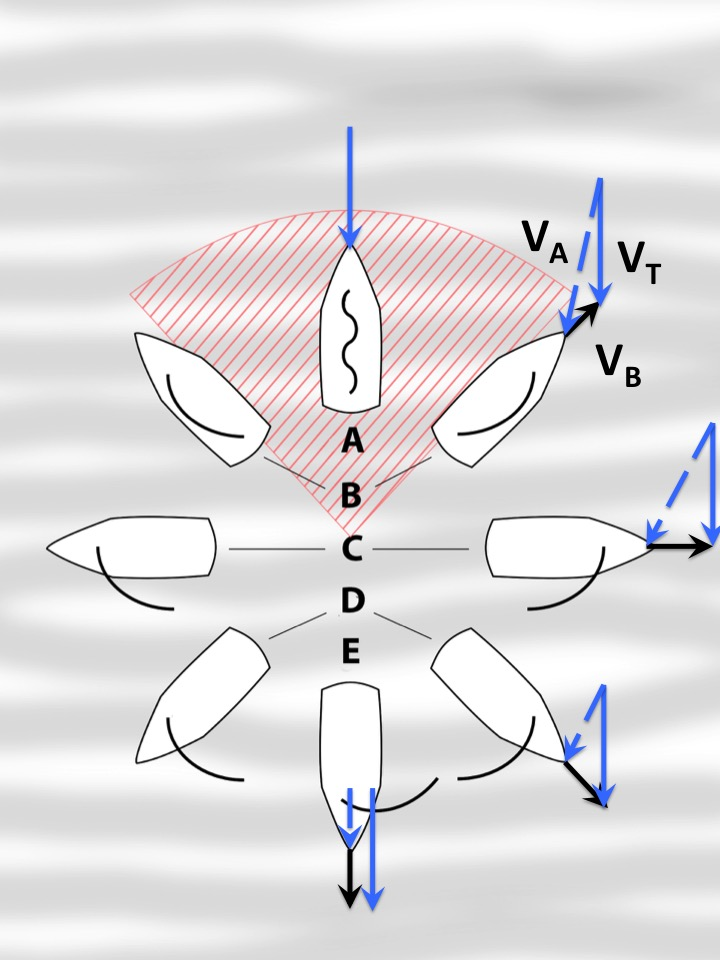
Points of sail (and predominant sail force component for a displacement sailboat). A. Luffing (no propulsive force) — 0–30° B. Close-Hauled (lift)— 30–50° C. Beam Reach (lift)— 90° D. Broad Reach (lift–drag)— ~135° E. Running (drag)— 180° True wind (V_{T}) is the same everywhere in the diagram, whereas boat velocity (V_{B}) and apparent wind (V_{A}) vary with point of sail.

Forces on sails result from movement of air that interacts with sails and gives them motive power for sailing craft, including sailing ships, sailboats, windsurfers, ice boats, and sail-powered land vehicles. Similar principles in a rotating frame of reference apply to windmill sails and wind turbine blades, which are also wind-driven. They are differentiated from forces on wings, and propeller blades, the actions of which are not adjusted to the wind. Kites also power certain sailing craft, but do not employ a mast to support the airfoil and are beyond the scope of this article.

Forces on sails depend on wind speed and direction and the speed and direction of the craft. The direction that the craft is traveling with respect to the "true wind" (the wind direction and speed over the surface) is called the point of sail. The speed of the craft at a given point of sail contributes to the "apparent wind"—the wind speed and direction as measured on the moving craft. The apparent wind on the sail creates a total aerodynamic force, which may be resolved into drag—the force component in the direction of the apparent wind—and lift—the force component normal (90°) to the apparent wind. Depending on the alignment of the sail with the apparent wind, lift or drag may be the predominant propulsive component. Total aerodynamic force also resolves into a forward, propulsive, driving force—resisted by the medium through or over which the craft is passing (e.g. through water, air, or over ice, sand)—and a lateral force, resisted by the underwater foils, ice runners, or wheels of the sailing craft.

For apparent wind angles aligned with the entry point of the sail, the sail acts as an airfoil and lift is the predominant component of propulsion. For apparent wind angles behind the sail, lift diminishes and drag increases as the predominant component of propulsion. For a given true wind velocity over the surface, a sail can propel a craft to a higher speed, on points of sail when the entry point of the sail is aligned with the apparent wind, than it can with the entry point not aligned, because of a combination of the diminished force from airflow around the sail and the diminished apparent wind from the velocity of the craft. Because of limitations on speed through the water, displacement sailboats generally derive power from sails generating lift on points of sail that include close-hauled through broad reach (approximately 40° to 135° off the wind). Because of low friction over the surface and high speeds over the ice that create high apparent wind speeds for most points of sail, iceboats can derive power from lift further off the wind than displacement boats.

Various mathematical models address lift and drag by taking into account the density of air, coefficients of lift and drag that result from the shape and area of the sail, and the speed and direction of the apparent wind, among other factors. This knowledge is applied to the design of sails in such a manner that sailors can adjust sails to the strength and direction of the apparent wind in order to provide motive power to sailing craft.

== Overview ==
The combination of a sailing craft's speed and direction with respect to the wind, together with wind strength, generate an apparent wind velocity. When the craft is aligned in a direction where the sail can be adjusted to align with its leading edge parallel to the apparent wind, the sail acts as an airfoil to generate lift in a direction perpendicular to the apparent wind. A component of this lift pushes the craft crosswise to its course, which is resisted by a sailboat's keel, an ice boat's blades or a land-sailing craft's wheels. An important component of lift is directed forward in the direction of travel and propels the craft.

=== Language of velocity and force ===
Nomenclature
Term described	Vector	Scalar
Variables relating to speed		
True wind velocity and speed	V_{T}	V_{T}
Boat velocity and speed	V_{B}	V_{B}
Apparent wind velocity and speed	V_{A}	V_{A}
Variables relating to force		
Lift on sail	L	L
Drag on sail	D	D
Total Aerodynamic Force on sail	F_{T}	F_{T}
Driving force component	F_{R}	F_{R}
Lateral component	F_{LAT}	F_{LAT}
Other variables and constants		
Apparent wind angle		α

To understand forces and velocities, discussed here, one must understand what is meant by a "vector" and a "scalar." Velocity (V), denoted as boldface in this article, is an example of a vector, because it implies both direction and speed. The corresponding speed (V ), denoted as italics in this article is a scalar value. Likewise, a force vector, F, denotes direction and strength, whereas its corresponding scalar (F ) denotes strength alone. Graphically, each vector is represented with an arrow that shows direction and a length that shows speed or strength. Vectors of consistent units (e.g. V in m/s or F in N) may be added and subtracted, graphically, by positioning tips and tails of the arrows, representing the input variables and drawing the resulting derived vector.

=== Components of force: lift vs. drag and driving vs. lateral force ===
Lift on a sail (L), acting as an airfoil, occurs in a direction perpendicular to the incident airstream (the apparent wind velocity, V_{A}, for the head sail) and is a result of pressure differences between the windward and leeward surfaces and depends on angle of attack, sail shape, air density, and speed of the apparent wind. Pressure differences result from the normal force per unit area on the sail from the air passing around it. The lift force results from the average pressure on the windward surface of the sail being higher than the average pressure on the leeward side. These pressure differences arise in conjunction with the curved air flow. As air follows a curved path along the windward side of a sail, there is a pressure gradient perpendicular to the flow direction with lower pressure on the outside of the curve and higher pressure on the inside. To generate lift, a sail must present an "angle of attack" (α) between the chord line of the sail and the apparent wind velocity (V_{A}). Angle of attack is a function of both the craft's point of sail and how the sail is adjusted with respect to the apparent wind.

As the lift generated by a sail increases, so does lift-induced drag, which together with parasitic drag constitutes total drag, (D). This occurs when the angle of attack increases with sail trim or change of course to cause the lift coefficient to increase up to the point of aerodynamic stall, so does the lift-induced drag coefficient. At the onset of stall, lift is abruptly decreased, as is lift-induced drag, but viscous pressure drag, a component of parasitic drag, increases due to the formation of separated flow on the surface of the sail. Sails with the apparent wind behind them (especially going downwind) operate in a stalled condition.

Lift and drag are components of the total aerodynamic force on sail (F_{T}). Since the forces on the sail are resisted by forces in the water (for a boat) or on the traveled surface (for an ice boat or land sailing craft), their corresponding forces can also be decomposed from total aerodynamic force into driving force (F_{R}) and lateral force (F_{LAT}). Driving force overcomes resistance to forward motion. Lateral force is met by lateral resistance from a keel, blade or wheel, but also creates a heeling force.

Decomposition of forces (in horizontal cross-section) acting on a sail, generating lift.
**F_{T}** is the Total Force acting on the sail for the Apparent Wind (**V_{A}**), shown. This resolves into forces felt by the sail, Lift (**L**) and Drag (**D**), with vectors shown in red and angle of attack noted as α.

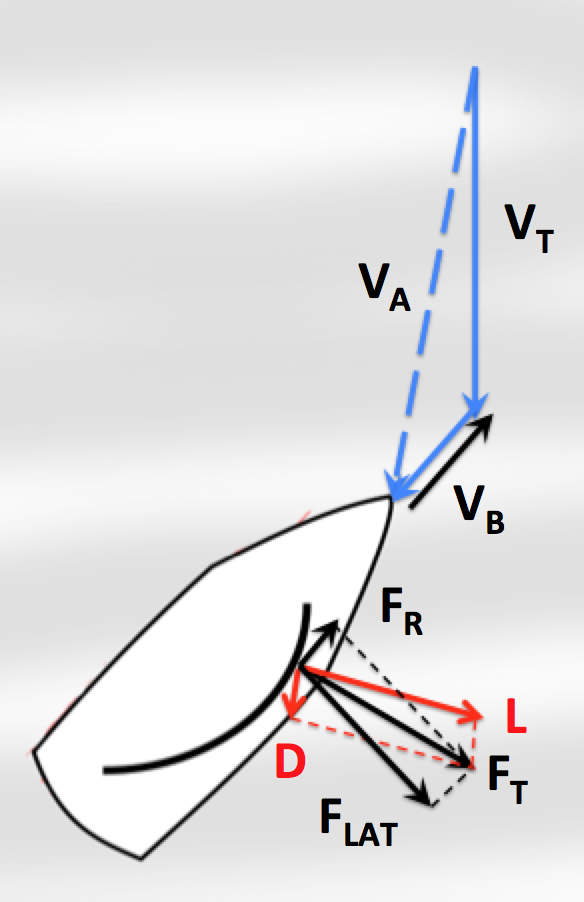
Wind forces acting on a sailboat sail (**L** and **D**) and being transmitted to the boat (**F_{R}**—propelling the boat forward—and **F_{LAT}**—pushing the boat sideways), while close-hauled, are both components of total aerodynamic force (**F_{T}**).

=== Effect of points of sail on forces ===
Apparent wind (V_{A}) is the air velocity acting upon the leading edge of the most forward sail or as experienced by instrumentation or crew on a moving sailing craft. It is the vector sum of true wind velocity and the apparent wind component resulting from boat velocity (V_{A} = −V_{B} + V_{T}). In nautical terminology, wind speeds are normally expressed in knots and wind angles in degrees. The craft's point of sail affects its velocity (V_{B}) for a given true wind velocity (V_{T}). Conventional sailing craft cannot derive power from the wind in a "no-go" zone that is approximately 40° to 50° away from the true wind, depending on the craft. Likewise, the directly downwind speed of all conventional sailing craft is limited to the true wind speed.

Effect of apparent wind on sailing craft at three points of sail

Boat velocity (in black) generates an equal and opposite apparent wind component (not shown), which adds to the true wind to become apparent wind.

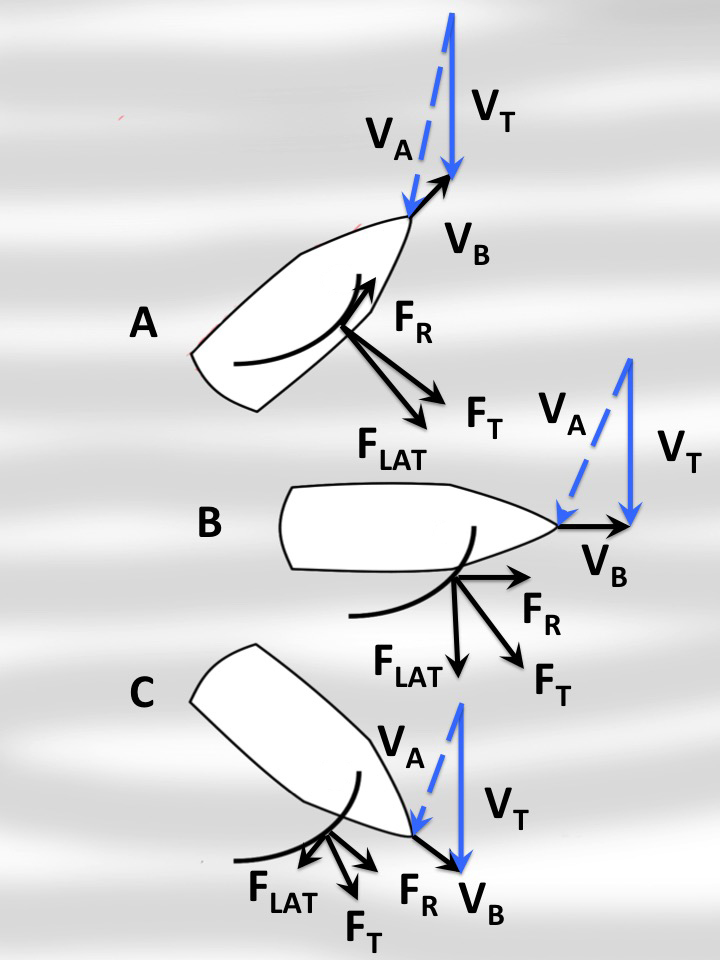
**Apparent wind and forces on a sailboat.**
As the boat sails further from the wind, the apparent wind becomes smaller and the lateral component becomes less; boat speed is highest on the beam reach.

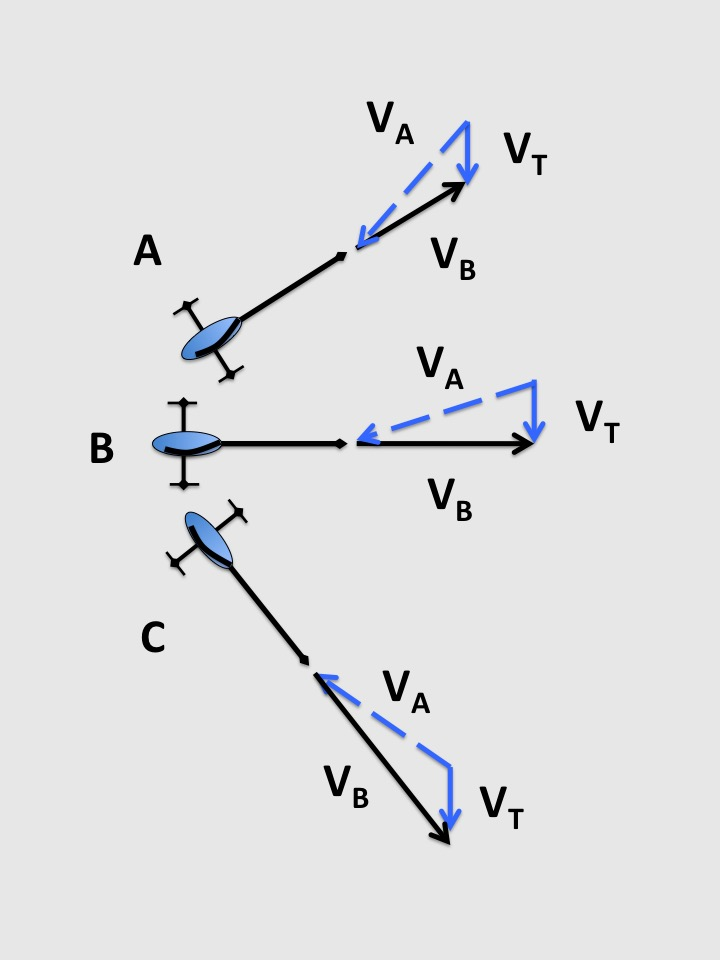
**Apparent wind on an iceboat.**
As the iceboat sails further from the wind, the apparent wind increases slightly and the boat speed is highest on the broad reach. The sail is sheeted in for all three points of sail.

Sailing craft A is close-hauled. Sailing craft B is on a beam reach. Sailing craft C is on a broad reach.

A sailboat's speed through the water is limited by the resistance that results from hull drag in the water. Sail boats on foils are much less limited. Ice boats typically have the least resistance to forward motion of any sailing craft. Craft with the higher forward resistance achieve lower forward velocities for a given wind velocity than ice boats, which can travel at speeds several multiples of the true wind speed. Consequently, a sailboat experiences a wider range of apparent wind angles than does an ice boat, whose speed is typically great enough to have the apparent wind coming from a few degrees to one side of its course, necessitating sailing with the sail sheeted in for most points of sail. On conventional sail boats, the sails are set to create lift for those points of sail where it's possible to align the leading edge of the sail with the apparent wind.

For a sailboat, point of sail affects lateral force significantly. The higher the boat points to the wind under sail, the stronger the lateral force, which requires resistance from a keel or other underwater foils, including daggerboard, centerboard, skeg and rudder. Lateral force also induces heeling in a sailboat, which requires resistance by weight of ballast from the crew or the boat itself and by the shape of the boat, especially with a catamaran. As the boat points off the wind, lateral force and the forces required to resist it become less important. On ice boats, lateral forces are countered by the lateral resistance of the blades on ice and their distance apart, which generally prevents heeling.

== Forces on sailing craft ==
Nomenclature
Term described	Vector	Scalar
Variables relating to forces on sails		
Centre of effort		CE
Apparent wind angle from course over ground		β
Angle of attack on jib		α_{j}
Angle of attack on main		α_{m}
Heel angle		θ
Heel force	F_{H}	F_{H}
Vertical aerodynamic force	F_{VERT}	F_{VERT}
Vertical moment arm		h
Variables relating to forces on hulls		
Centre of Lateral resistance		CLR
Centre of buoyancy		CB
Centre of gravity		CG
Leeway angle		λ
Total hydrodynamic force on hull	F_{l}	F_{l}
Hydrodynamic lift	P_{l}	P_{l}
Hydrodynamic lateral force	P_{LAT}	P_{LAT}
Hydrodynamic resistance	R_{l}	R_{l}
Hydrostatic displacement weight	W	W
Buoyancy force	Δ	Δ
Horizontal moment arm		b

Each sailing craft is a system that mobilizes wind force through its sails—supported by spars and rigging—which provide motive power and reactive force from the underbody of a sailboat—including the keel, centerboard, rudder or other underwater foils—or the running gear of an ice boat or land craft, which allows it to be kept on a course. Without the ability to mobilize reactive forces in directions different from the wind direction, a craft would simply be adrift before the wind.

Accordingly, motive and heeling forces on sailing craft are either components of or reactions to the total aerodynamic force (F_{T}) on sails, which is a function of apparent wind velocity (V_{A}) and varies with point of sail. The forward driving force (F_{R}) component contributes to boat velocity (V_{B}), which is, itself, a determinant of apparent wind velocity. Absent lateral reactive forces to F_{T} from a keel (in water), a skate runner (on ice) or a wheel (on land), a craft would only be able to move downwind and the sail would not be able to develop lift.

At a stable angle of heel (for a sailboat) and a steady speed, aerodynamic and hydrodynamic forces are in balance. Integrated over the sailing craft, the total aerodynamic force (F_{T}) is located at the centre of effort (CE), which is a function of the design and adjustment of the sails on a sailing craft. Similarly, the total hydrodynamic force (F_{l}) is located at the centre of lateral resistance (CLR), which is a function of the design of the hull and its underwater appendages (keel, rudder, foils, etc.). These two forces act in opposition to one another with F_{l} a reaction to F_{T}.

Whereas ice boats and land-sailing craft resist lateral forces with their wide stance and high-friction contact with the surface, sailboats travel through water, which provides limited resistance to side forces. In a sailboat, side forces are resisted in two ways:

- Leeway: Leeway is the rate of travel perpendicular to the course. It is constant when the lateral force on the sail (F_{LAT}) equals the lateral force on the boat's keel and other underwater appendages (P_{LAT}). This causes the boat to travel through the water on a course that is different from the direction in which the boat is pointed by the angle (λ ), which is called the "leeway angle."
- Heeling: The heeling angle (θ) is constant when the torque between the centre of effort (CE) on the sail and the centre of resistance on the hull (CR) over moment arm (h) equals the torque between the boat's centre of buoyancy (CB) and its centre of gravity (CG) over moment arm (b), described as heeling moment.

All sailing craft reach a constant forward speed (V_{B}) for a given wind speed (V_{T}) and point of sail, when the forward driving force (F_{R}) equals the forward resisting force (R_{l}). For an ice boat, the dominant forward resisting force is aerodynamic, since the coefficient of friction on smooth ice is as low as 0.02. Accordingly, high-performance ice boats are streamlined to minimize aerodynamic drag.

Aerodynamic forces in balance with hydrodynamic forces on a close-hauled sailboat

Top view.

Stern view.

=== Force components on sails ===
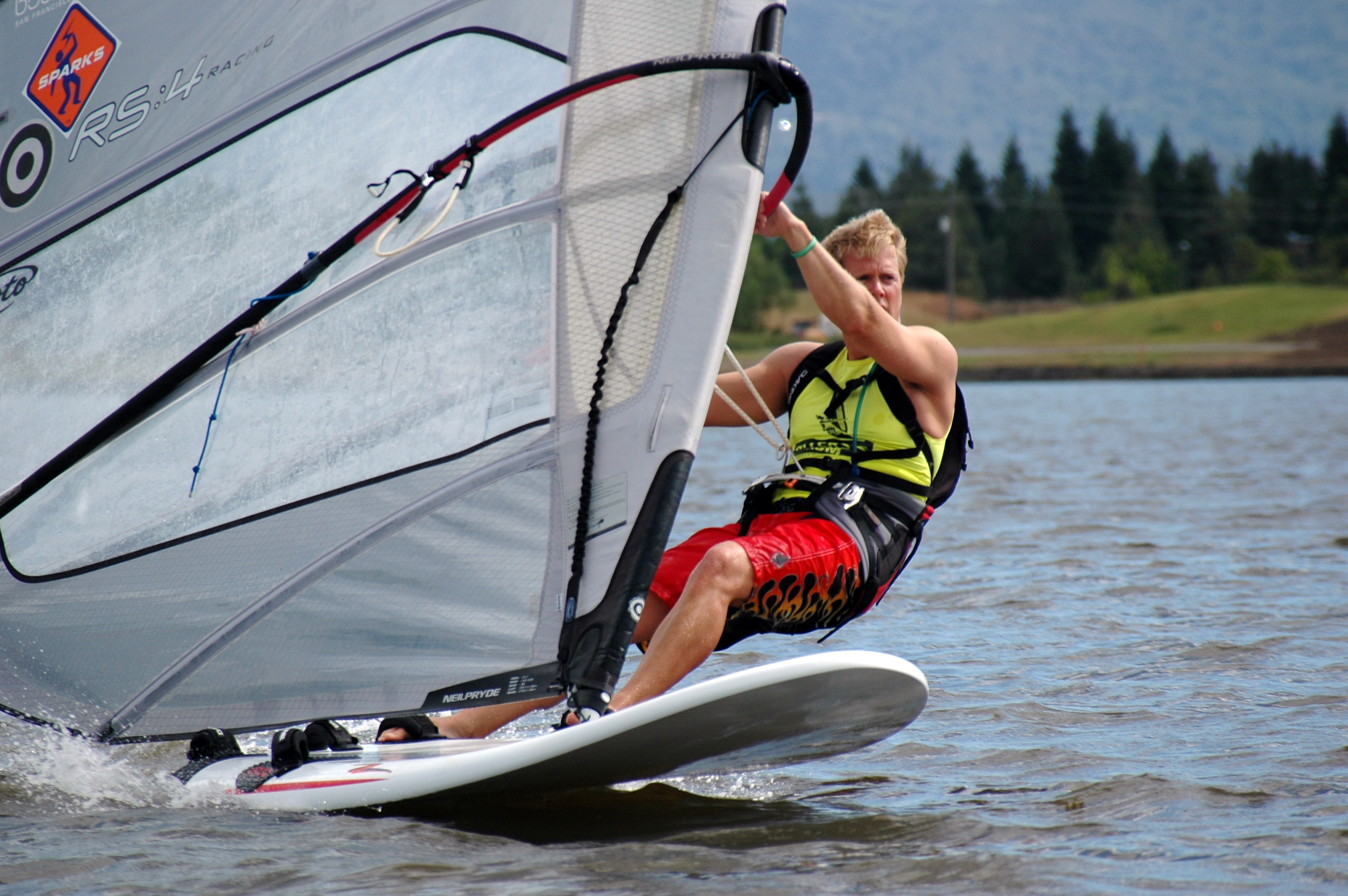
Windsurfers employ lift vertical to the water to reduce drag on the board by leaning the sail towards the wind.

The approximate locus of net aerodynamic force on a craft with a single sail is the centre of effort (CE ) at the geometric centre of the sail. Filled with wind, the sail has a roughly spherical polygon shape and if the shape is stable, then the location of centre of effort is stable. On sailing craft with multiple sails, the position of centre of effort varies with the sail plan. Sail trim or airfoil profile, boat trim and point of sail also affect CE. On a given sail, the net aerodynamic force on the sail is located approximately at the maximum draught intersecting the camber of the sail and passing through a plane intersecting the centre of effort, normal to the leading edge (luff), roughly perpendicular to the chord of the sail (a straight line between the leading edge (luff) and the trailing edge (leech)). Net aerodynamic force with respect to the air stream is usually considered in reference to the direction of the apparent wind (V_{A}) over the surface plane (ocean, land or ice) and is decomposed into lift (L), perpendicular with V_{A}, and drag (D), in line with V_{A}. For windsurfers, lift component vertical to the surface plane is important, because in strong winds windsurfer sails are leaned into the wind to create a vertical lifting component ( F_{VERT}) that reduces drag on the board (hull) through the water. Note that F_{VERT} acts downwards for boats heeling away from the wind, but is negligible under normal conditions.

The three dimensional vector relationship for net aerodynamic force with respect to apparent wind (V_{A}) is:

$$\mathbf{F_T} = \mathbf{L} + \mathbf{D} + \mathbf{F_{VERT}}$$

Likewise, net aerodynamic force may be decomposed into the three translational directions with respect to a boat's course over the surface: surge (forward/astern), sway (starboard/port—relevant to leeway), and heave (up/down). The scalar values and direction of these components can be dynamic, depending on wind and waves (for a boat). In this case, F_{T} is considered in reference to the direction of the boat's course and is decomposed into driving force (F_{R}), in line with the boat's course, and lateral force (F_{LAT}), perpendicular with the boat's course. Again for windsurfers, the lift component vertical to the surface plane ( F_{VERT}) is important.

The three dimensional vector relationship for net aerodynamic force with respect to the course over the surface is:

$$\mathbf{F_T} = \mathbf{F_R} + \mathbf{F_{LAT}} + \mathbf{F_{VERT}}$$

The values of driving force (F_{R} ) and lateral force (F_{LAT} ) with apparent wind angle (α), assuming no heeling, relate to the values of lift (L ) and drag (D ), as follows:

$$F_R = L \cdot \sin(\alpha) - D \cdot \cos(\alpha)$$
$$\ F_{LAT} =  L \cdot \cos(\alpha) + D \cdot \sin(\alpha)$$

=== Reactive forces on sailing craft ===
Reactive forces on sailing craft include forward resistance—sailboat's hydrodynamic resistance (R_{l}), an ice boat's sliding resistance or a land sailing craft's rolling resistance in the direction of travel—which are to be minimized in order to increase speed, and lateral force, perpendicular to the direction of travel, which is to be made sufficiently strong to minimize sideways motion and to guide the craft on course.

Forward resistance comprises the types of drag that impede a sailboat's speed through water (or an ice boat's speed over the surface) include components of parasitic drag, consisting primarily of form drag, which arises because of the shape of the hull, and skin friction, which arises from the friction of the water (for boats) or air (for ice boats and land sailing craft) against the "skin" of the hull that is moving through it. Displacement vessels are also subject to wave resistance from the energy that goes into displacing water into waves and that is limited by hull speed, which is a function of waterline length, Wheeled vehicles' forward speed is subject to rolling friction and ice boats are subject to kinetic or sliding friction. Parasitic drag in water or air increases with the square of speed (V_{B}^{2} or V_{A}^{2}, respectively); rolling friction increases linearly with velocity; whereas kinetic friction is normally a constant, but on ice may become reduced with speed as it transitions to lubricated friction with melting.

Ways to reduce wave-making resistance used on sailing vessels include reduced displacement—through planing or (as with a windsurfer) offsetting vessel weight with a lifting sail—and fine entry, as with catamarans, where a narrow hull minimizes the water displaced into a bow wave. Sailing hydrofoils also substantially reduce forward friction with an underwater foil that lifts the vessel free of the water.

Sailing craft with low forward resistance and high lateral resistance.

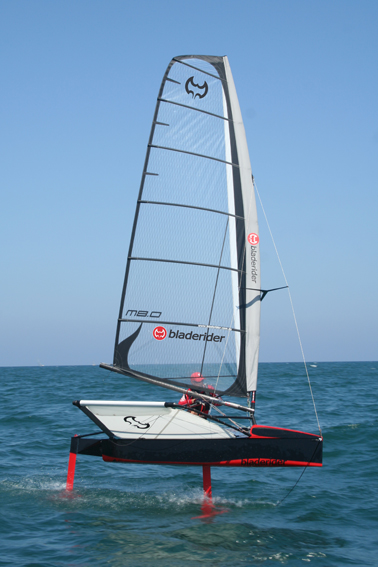
International Moth class sailboat on foils.

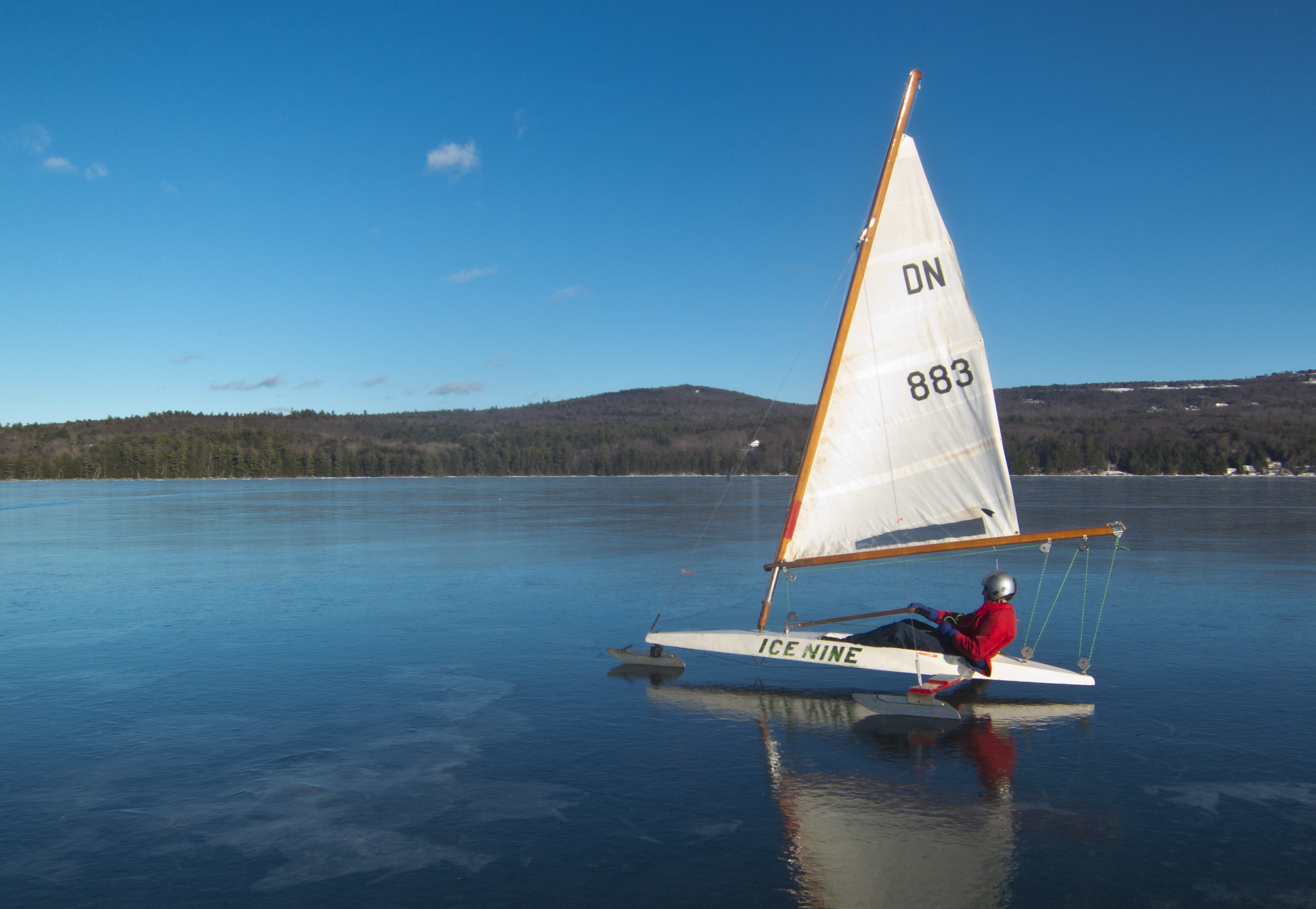
DN class ice boat.

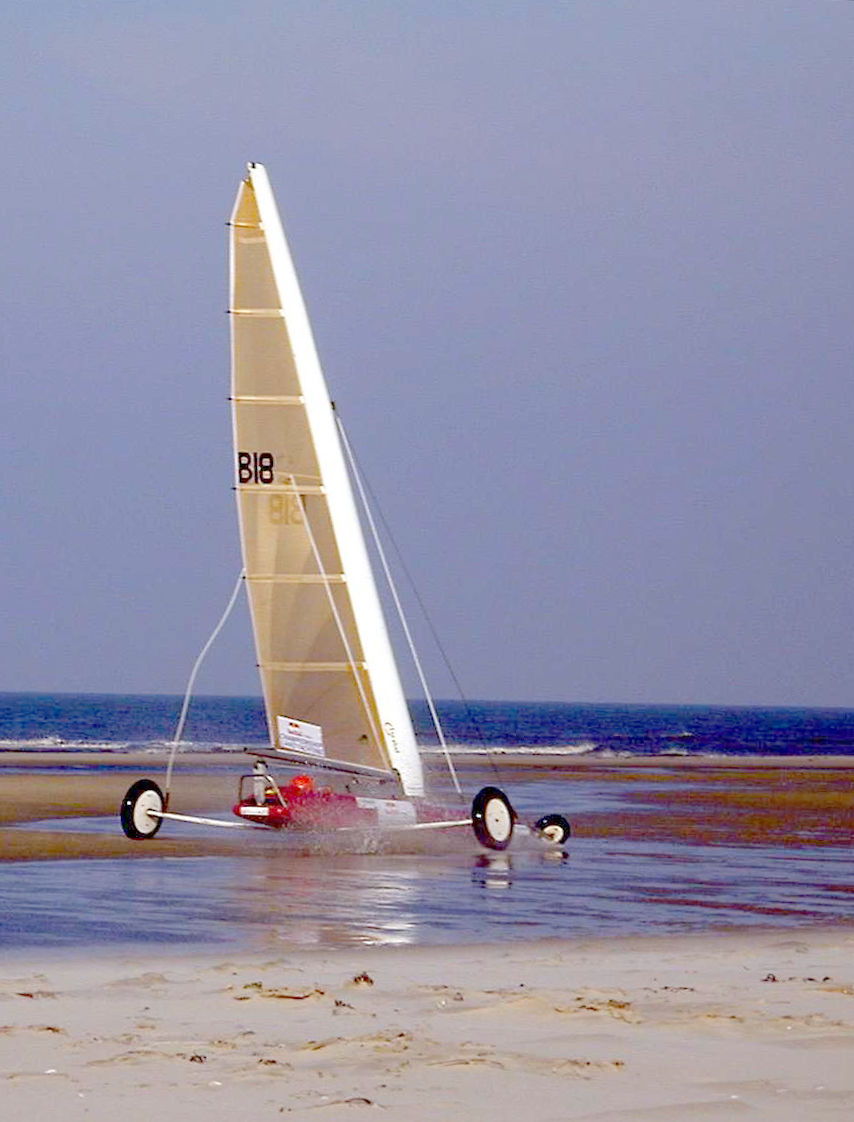
Land sailing craft.

Sailing craft with low forward resistance can achieve high velocities with respect to the wind velocity:

- High-performance catamarans, including the Extreme 40 catamaran and International C-class catamaran can sail at speeds up to twice the speed of the wind.
- Sailing hydrofoils achieve boat speeds up to twice the speed of the wind, as did the AC72 catamarans used for the 2013 America's Cup.
- Ice boats can sail up to five times the speed of the wind.

Lateral force is a reaction supplied by the underwater shape of a sailboat, the blades of an ice boat and the wheels of a land sailing craft. Sailboats rely on keels, centerboards, and other underwater foils, including rudders, that provide lift in the lateral direction, to provide hydrodynamic lateral force (P_{LAT}) to offset the lateral force component acting on the sail (F_{LAT}) and minimize leeway. Such foils provide hydrodynamic lift and, for keels, ballast to offset heeling. They incorporate a wide variety of design considerations.

=== Rotational forces on sailing craft ===
The forces on sails that contribute to torque and cause rotation with respect to the boat's longitudinal (fore and aft), horizontal (abeam) and vertical (aloft) rotational axes result in: roll (e.g. heeling). pitch (e.g. pitch-poling), and yaw (e.g. broaching). Heeling, which results from the lateral force component (F_{LAT}), is the most significant rotational effect of total aerodynamic force (F_{T}). In stasis, heeling moment from the wind and righting moment from the boat's heel force (F_{H} ) and its opposing hydrodynamic lift force on hull (F_{l} ), separated by a distance (h = "heeling arm"), versus its hydrostatic displacement weight (W ) and its opposing buoyancy force (Δ), separated by a distance (b = "righting arm") are in balance:

$h \times F_H = b \times \Delta = h \times F_l = b \times W$
(heeling arm × heeling force = righting arm × buoyancy force = heeling arm × hydrodynamic lift force on hull = righting arm × displacement weight)

Nomenclature
Term described	Vector	Scalar
Variables relating to wind speed		
Height of wind measurement datum		h_{0}
Height of wind measurement		h
Wind speed at height		V(h)
Power law exponent		p
Gust strength		G
Variables relating to forces on sail		
Aerodynamic coefficient		C
Aerodynamic force		F
Lift Coefficient		C_{L}
Drag Coefficient		C_{D}
Density of air		ρ
Area of sail		A

Sails come in a wide variety of configurations that are designed to match the capabilities of the sailing craft to be powered by them. They are designed to stay within the limitations of a craft's stability and power requirements, which are functions of hull (for boats) or chassis (for land craft) design. Sails derive power from wind that varies in time and with height above the surface. In order to do so, they are designed to adjust to the wind force for various points of sail. Both their design and method for control include means to match their lift and drag capabilities to the available apparent wind, by changing surface area, angle of attack, and curvature.

=== Wind variation with elevation ===
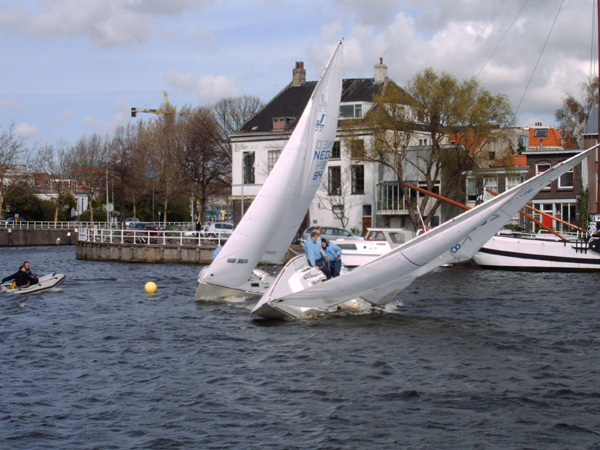
Wind gust increasing heeling moment on the right-hand J/22-class boat.

Wind speed increases with height above the surface; at the same time, wind speed may vary over short periods of time as gusts. These considerations may be described empirically.

Measurements show that wind speed, (V (h ) ) varies, according to a power law with height (h ) above a non-zero measurement height datum (h_{0} —e.g. at the height of the foot of a sail), using a reference wind speed measured at the datum height (V (h_{0} ) ), as follows:

$$V(h) =V(h_0) \left(
\frac{h}{h_0}
\right)^p$$

Where the power law exponent (p) has values that have been empirically determined to range from 0.11 over the ocean to 0.31 over the land.

This means that a V (3 m) = 5-m/s (≈10-knot) wind at 3 m above the water would be approximately V (15 m) = 6 m/s (≈12 knots) at 15 m above the water. In hurricane-force winds with V (3 m) = 40-m/s (≈78 knots) the speed at 15 m would be V (15 m) = 49 m/s (≈95 knots) with p = 0.128. This suggests that sails that reach higher above the surface can be subject to stronger wind forces that move the centre of effort (CE ) higher above the surface and increase the heeling moment.

Additionally, apparent wind direction moves aft with height above water, which may necessitate a corresponding twist in the shape of the sail to achieve attached flow with height.

=== Wind variation with time ===
Hsu gives a simple formula for a gust factor (G ) for winds as a function of the exponent (p ), above, where G is the ratio of the wind gust speed to baseline wind speed at a given height:

$$G = 1 + 2p$$

So, for a given windspeed and Hsu's recommended value of p = 0.126, one can expect G = 1.5 (a 10-knot wind might gust up to 15 knots). This, combined with changes in wind direction suggest the degree to which a sailing craft must adjust to wind gusts on a given course.

== Forces on sails ==
A sailing craft's motive system comprises one or more sails, supported by spars and rigging, that derive power from the wind and induce reactive force from the underbody of a sailboat or the running gear of an ice boat or land craft. Depending on the angle of attack of a set of sails with respect to the apparent wind, each sail is providing motive force to the sailing craft either from lift-dominant attached flow or drag-dominant separated flow. Additionally, sails may interact with one another to create forces that are different from the sum of the individual contributions each sail, when used alone.

=== Lift predominant (attached flow) ===
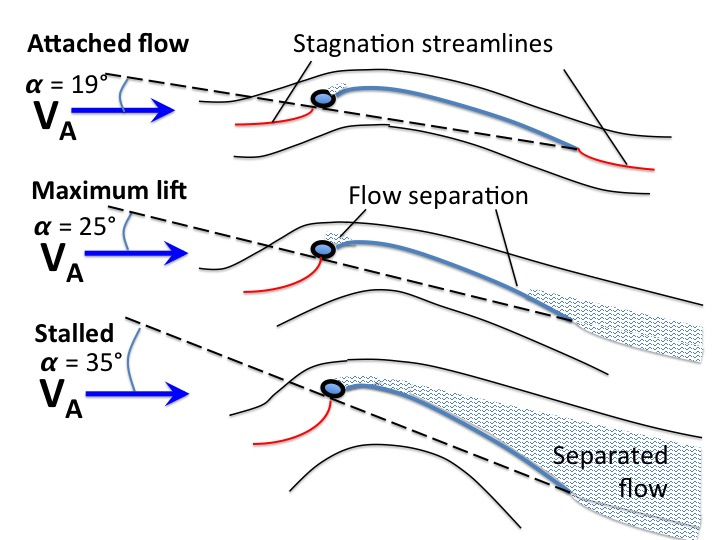
Sail angles of attack and resulting (idealized) flow patterns for attached flow, maximum lift, and stalled for a hypothetical sail. The stagnation streamlines (red) delineate air passing to the leeward side (top) from that passing to the windward (bottom) side of the sail.

Sails allow progress of a sailing craft to windward, thanks to their ability to generate lift (and the craft's ability to resist the lateral forces that result). Each sail configuration has a characteristic coefficient of lift and attendant coefficient of drag, which can be determined experimentally and calculated theoretically. Sailing craft orient their sails with a favorable angle of attack between the entry point of the sail and the apparent wind as their course changes. The ability to generate lift is limited by sailing too close to the wind when no effective angle of attack is available to generate lift (luffing) and sailing sufficiently off the wind that the sail cannot be oriented at a favorable angle of attack (running downwind). Instead, past a critical angle of attack, the sail stalls and promotes flow separation.

==== Effect of angle of attack on coefficients of lift and drag ====
Each type of sail, acting as an airfoil, has characteristic coefficients of lift (C_{L} ) and lift-induced drag (C_{D} ) at a given angle of attack, which follow that same basic form of:

$$C = {\frac{F}{\frac{1}{2}\rho {V_A}^2A}}$$

Where force (F) equals lift (L) for forces measured perpendicular to the airstream to determine C = C_{L} or force (F) equals drag (D) for forces measured in line with the airstream to determine C = C_{D} on a sail of area (A) and a given aspect ratio (length to average cord width). These coefficients vary with angle of attack (α_{j} for a headsail) with respect to the incident wind (V_{A} for a headsail). This formulation allows determination of C_{L} and C_{D} experimentally for a given sail shape by varying angle of attack at an experimental wind velocity and measuring force on the sail in the direction of the incident wind (D—drag) and perpendicular to it (L—lift). As the angle of attack grows larger, the lift reaches a maximum at some angle; increasing the angle of attack beyond this critical angle of attack causes the upper-surface flow to separate from the convex surface of the sail; there is less deflection of air to windward, so the sail as airfoil generates less lift. The sail is said to be stalled. At the same time, induced drag increases with angle of attack (for the headsail: α_{j} ).

Determination of coefficients of lift (C_{L} ) and drag (C_{D} ) for angle of attack and aspect ratio

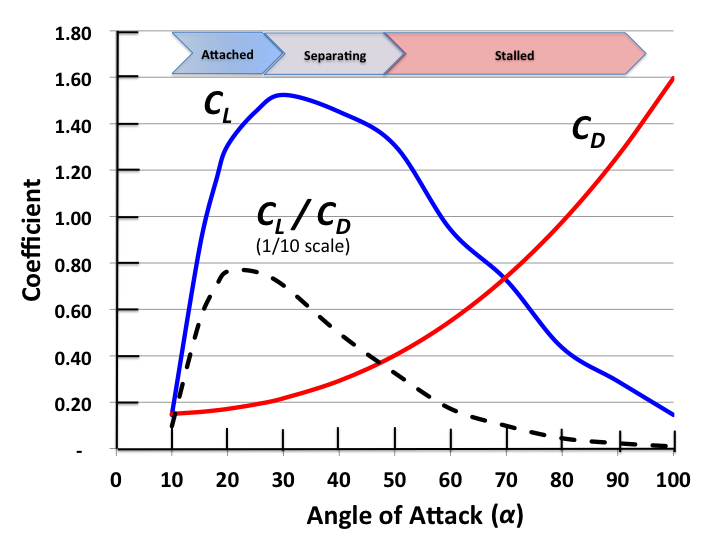
Angle of attack: Coefficient of lift (C_{L}) and coefficient of drag (C_{D}) and their ratio as a function of angle of attack (α) for a hypothetical sail.

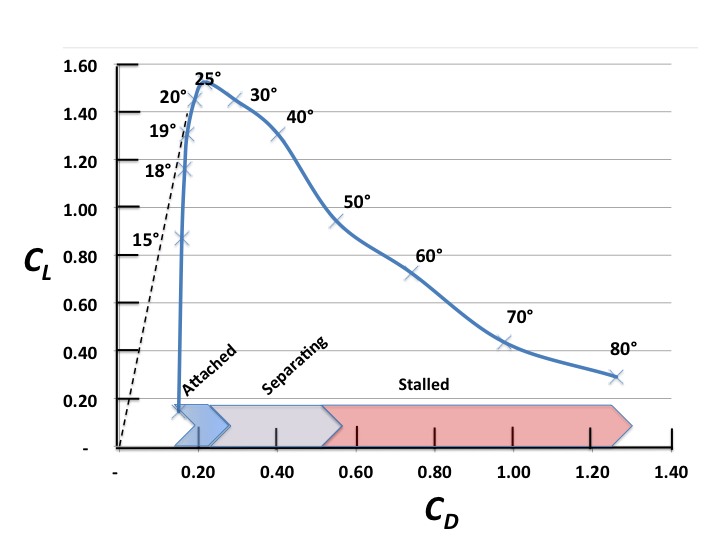
Polar diagram: Coefficients of lift (C_{L}) and drag (C_{D}) for the angles of attack shown for the same sail. The dotted line is tangential with the point of highest ratio of lift over drag (C_{L} / C_{D} ).

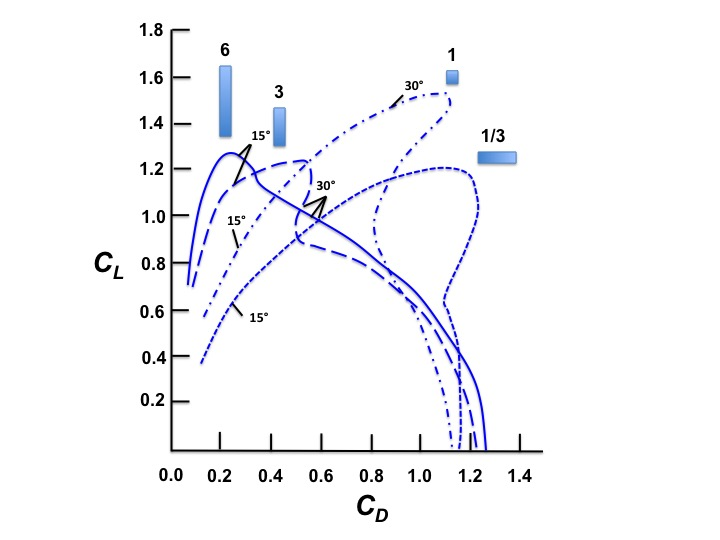
Aspect ratio: Polar plots of C_{L} versus C_{D} for cambered plates of the same camber, but different aspect ratios, as shown. The values at angles of attack of 15° and 30° are shown for each plate. From Eiffel wind tunnel studies.

Fossati presents polar diagrams that relate coefficients of lift and drag for different angles of attack based on the work of Gustave Eiffel, who pioneered wind tunnel experiments on airfoils, which he published in 1910. Among them were studies of cambered plates. The results shown are for plates of varying camber and aspect ratios, as shown. They show that, as aspect ratio decreases, maximum lift shifts further towards increased drag (rightwards in the diagram). They also show that, for lower angles of attack, a higher aspect ratio generates more lift and less drag than for lower aspect ratios.

==== Effect of coefficients of lift and drag on forces ====
If the lift and drag coefficients (C_{L} and C_{D}) for a sail at a specified angle of attack are known, then the lift (L) and drag (D) forces produced can be determined, using the following equations, which vary as the square of apparent wind speed (V_{A} ):

$$L = \tfrac12\rho {V_A}^2 A C_L$$

$$D = \tfrac12\rho {V_A}^2 A C_D$$

Garrett demonstrates how those diagrams translate into lift and drag, for a given sail, on different points of sail, in diagrams similar to these:

Polar diagrams, showing lift (L), drag (D), total aerodynamic force (F_{T}), forward driving force (F_{R}), and lateral force (F_{LAT}) for upwind points of sail

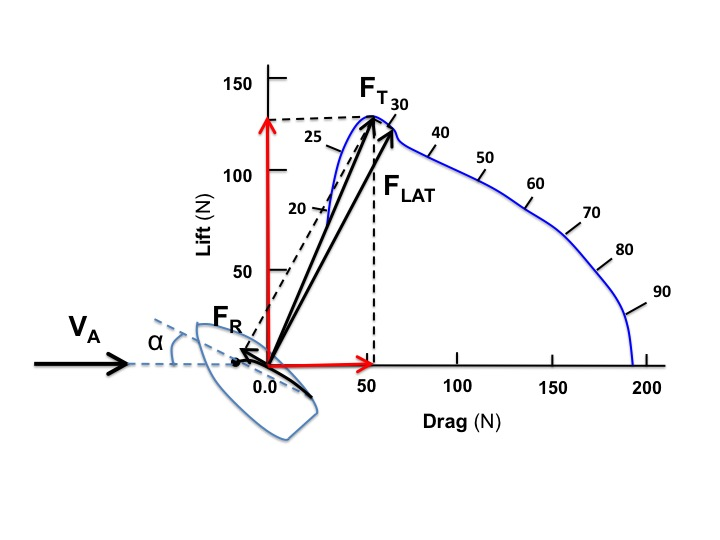
Close-hauled: The lateral force is highest and driving force is lowest close to the wind.

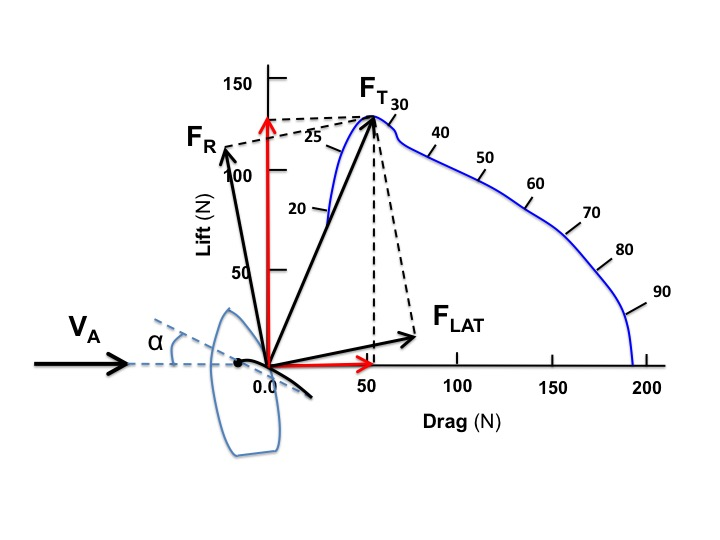
Reach: Lift more aligned with the direction of travel increases driving force and decreases lateral force.

In these diagrams the direction of travel changes with respect to the apparent wind (V_{A}), which is constant for the purpose of illustration. In reality, for a constant true wind, apparent wind would vary with point of sail. Constant V_{A} in these examples means that either V_{T} or V_{B} varies with point of sail; this allows the same polar diagram to be used for comparison with the same conversion of coefficients into units of force (in this case Newtons). In the examples for close-hauled and reach (left and right), the sail's angle of attack (α ) is essentially constant, although the boom angle over the boat changes with point of sail to trim the sail close to the highest lift force on the polar curve. In these cases, lift and drag are the same, but the decomposition of total aerodynamic force (F_{T}) into forward driving force (F_{R}) and lateral force (F_{LAT}) vary with point of sail. Forward driving force (F_{R}) increases, as the direction of travel is more aligned with the wind, and lateral force (F_{LAT}) decreases.

In reference to the above diagrams relating lift and drag, Garrett explains that for a maximum speed made good to windward, the sail must be trimmed to an angle of attack that is greater than the maximum lift/drag ratio (more lift), while the hull is operated in a manner that is lower than its maximum lift/drag ratio (more drag).

=== Drag predominant (separated flow) ===
When sailing craft are on a course where the angle of attack between the sail and the apparent wind (α ) exceeds the point of maximum lift on the C_{L}–C_{D} polar diagram, separation of flow occurs. The separation becomes more pronounced until at α = 90° lift becomes small and drag predominates. In addition to the sails used upwind, spinnakers provide area and curvature appropriate for sailing with separated flow on downwind points of sail.

Polar diagrams, showing lift (L), drag (D), total aerodynamic force (F_{T}), forward driving force (F_{R}), and lateral force (F_{LAT}) for downwind points of sail

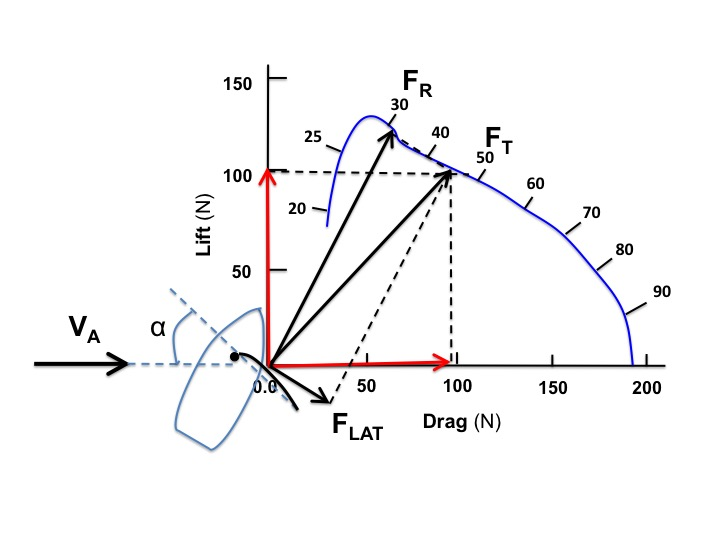
Broad Reach: With apparent wind behind the sail (α = 45°), the sail has stalled and lift has diminished.

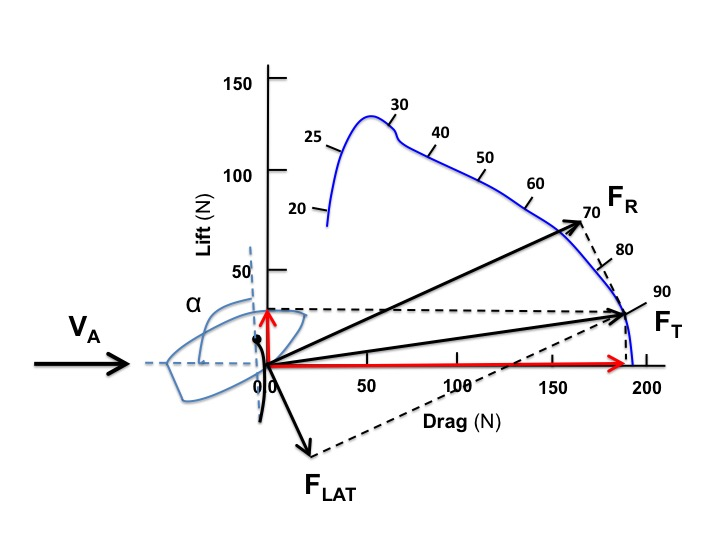
Running before the wind: With apparent wind directly behind the sail (α = 90°), drag forces dominate.

Again, in these diagrams the direction of travel changes with respect to the apparent wind (V_{A}), which is constant for the sake of illustration, but would in reality vary with point of sail for a constant true wind. In the left-hand diagram (broad reach), the boat is on a point of sail, where the sail can no longer be aligned into the apparent wind to create an optimum angle of attack. Instead, the sail is in a stalled condition, creating about 80% of the lift as in the upwind examples and drag has doubled. Total aerodynamic force (F_{T}) has moved away from the maximum lift value. In the right-hand diagram (running before the wind), lift is one-fifth of the upwind cases (for the same strength apparent wind) and drag has almost quadrupled.

Downwind sailing with a spinnaker

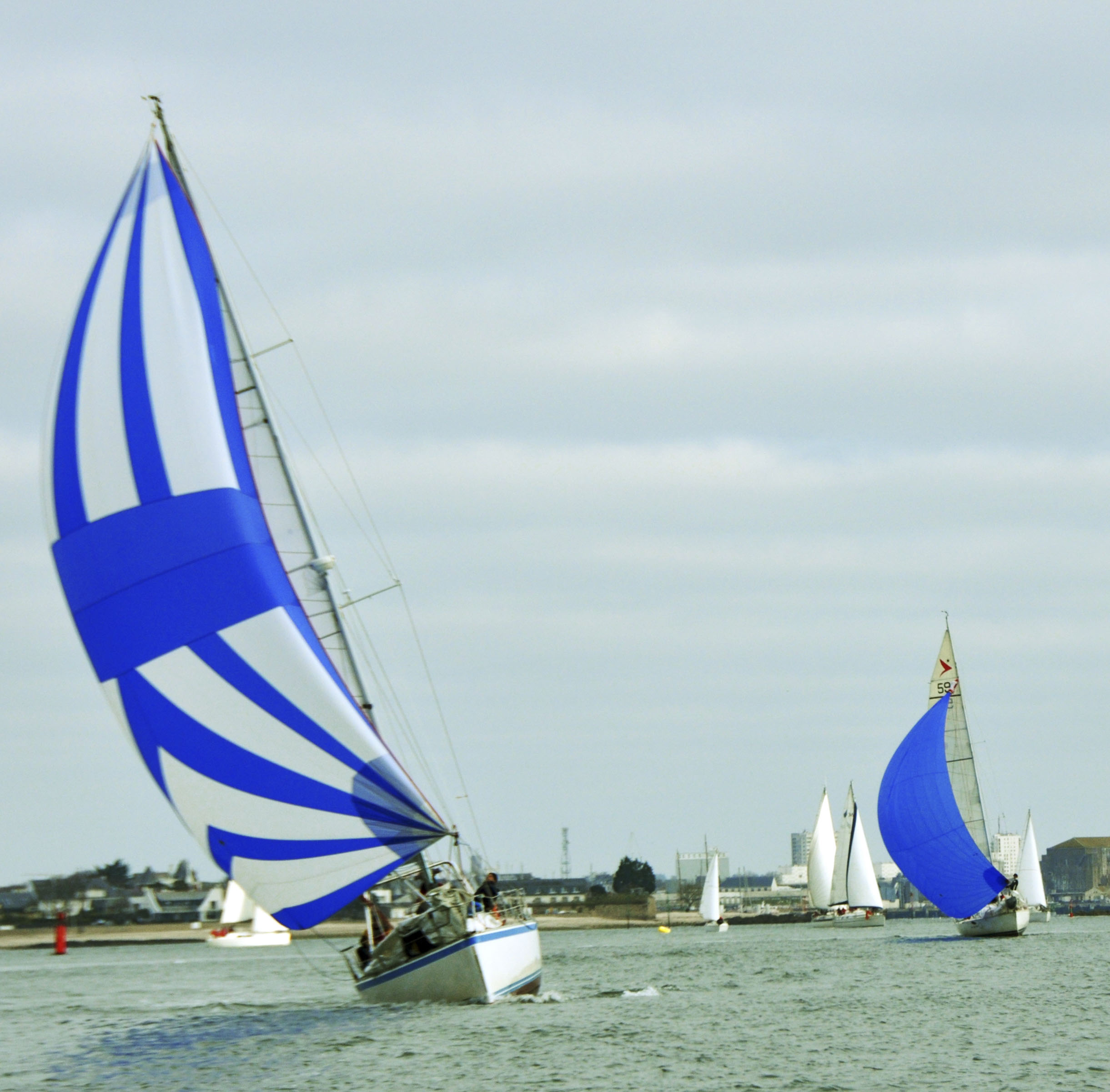
Spinnaker set for a broad reach, generating both lift with separated flow and drag.

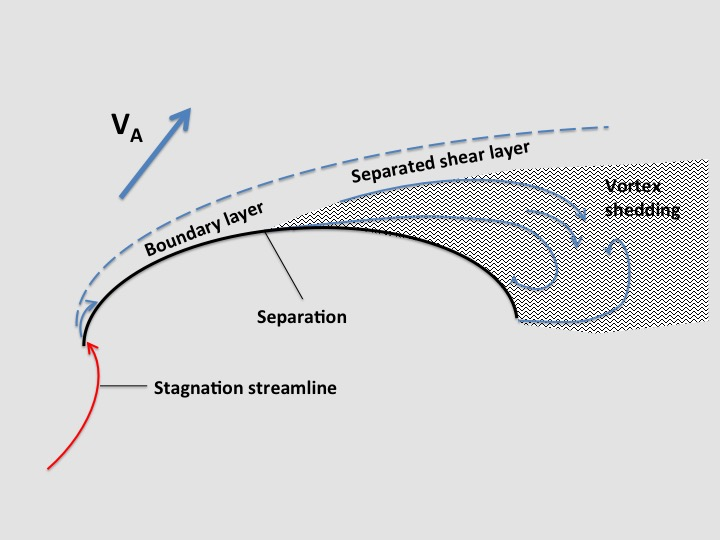
Spinnaker cross-section trimmed for a broad reach showing transition from boundary layer to separated flow where vortex shedding commences.

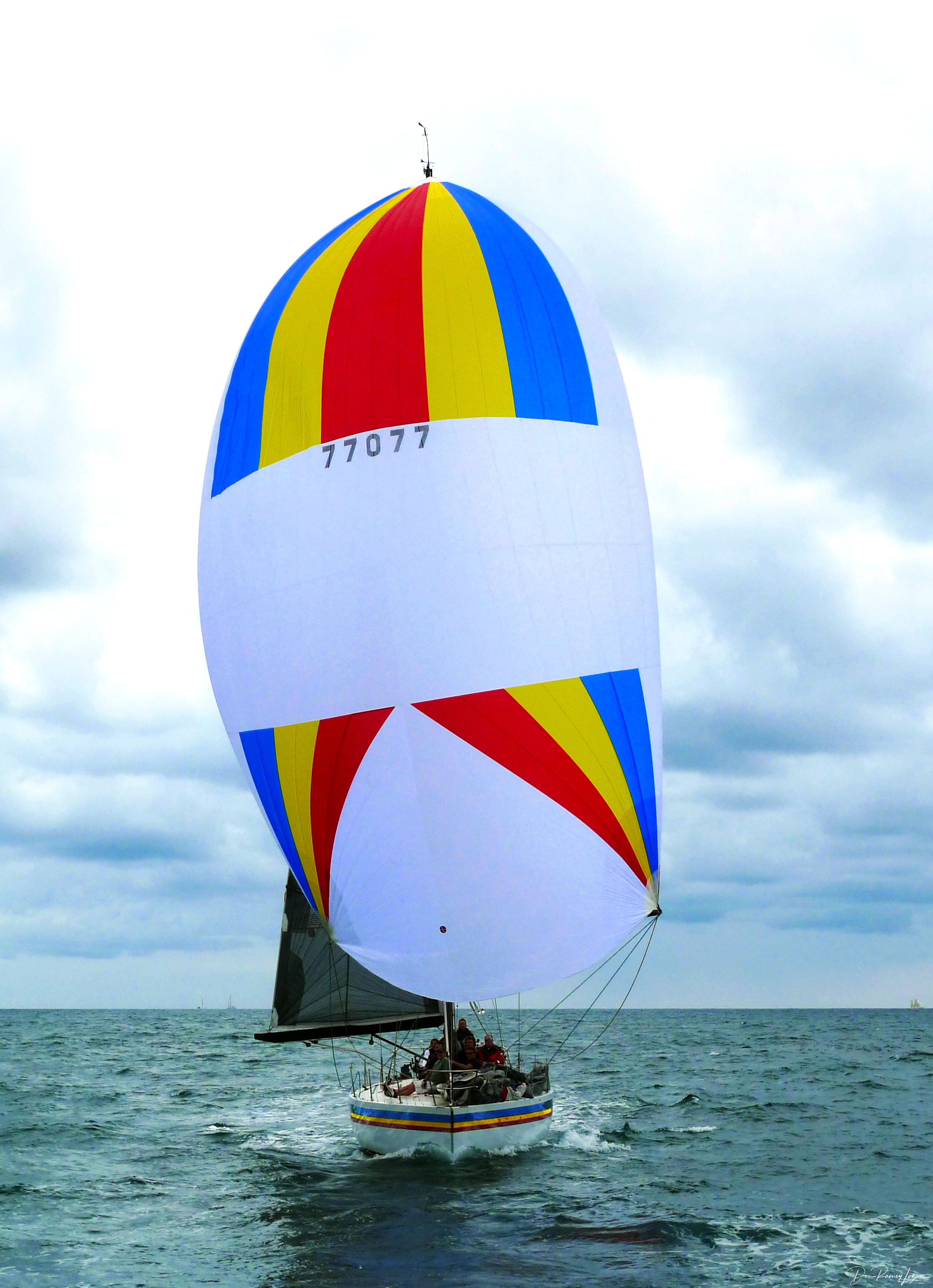
Symmetric spinnaker while running downwind, primarily generating drag.

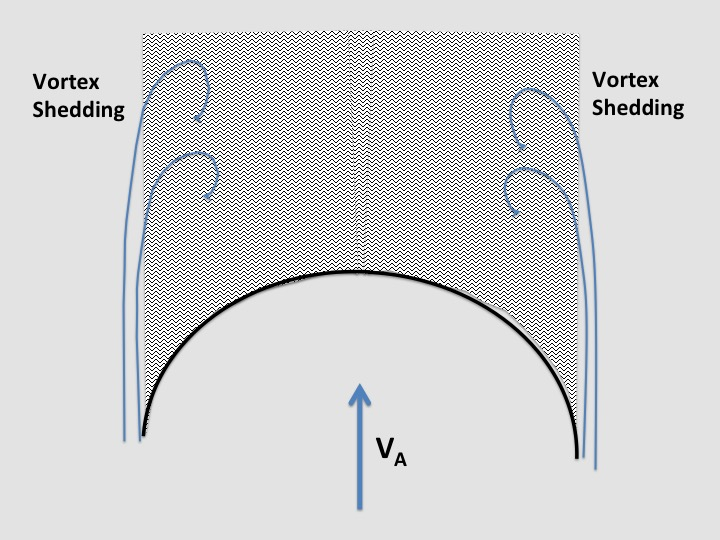
Symmetric spinnaker cross-section with following apparent wind, showing vortex shedding.

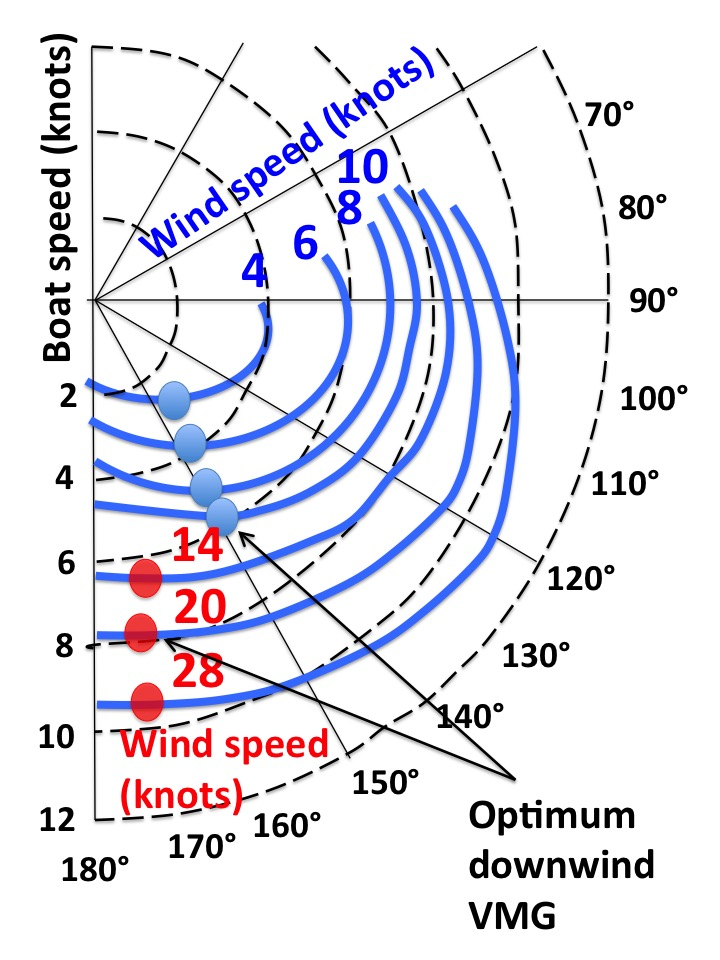
Downwind polar diagram to determine velocity made good at various wind speeds for a hypothetical displacement sailboat and sail plan.

A velocity prediction program can translate sail performance and hull characteristics into a polar diagram, depicting boat speed for various windspeeds at each point of sail. Displacement sailboats exhibit a change in what course has the best velocity made good (VMG), depending on windspeed. For the example given, the sailboat achieves best downwind VMG for windspeed of 10 knots and less at a course about 150° off the wind. For higher windspeed the optimum downwind VMG occurs at more than 170° off the wind. This "downwind cliff" (abrupt change in optimum downwind course) results from the change of balance in drag forces on the hull with speed.

=== Sail interactions ===
Sailboats often have a jib that overlaps the mainsail—called a genoa. Arvel Gentry demonstrated in his series of articles published in "Best of sail trim" published in 1977 (and later reported and republished in summary in 1981) that the genoa and the mainsail interact in a symbiotic manner, owing to the circulation of air between them slowing down in the gap between the two sails (contrary to traditional explanations), which prevents separation of flow along the mainsail. The presence of a jib causes the stagnation line on the mainsail to move forward, which reduces the suction velocities on the main and reduces the potential for boundary layer separation and stalling. This allows higher angles of attack. Likewise, the presence of the mainsail causes the stagnation line on the jib to be shifted aft and allows the boat to point closer to the wind, owing to higher leeward velocities of the air over both sails.

The two sails cause an overall larger displacement of air perpendicular to the direction of flow when compared to one sail. They act to form a larger wing, or airfoil, around which the wind must pass. The total length around the outside has also increased and the difference in air speed between windward and leeward sides of the two sails is greater, resulting in more lift. The jib experiences a greater increase in lift with the two sail combination.

== Sail performance design variables ==
Sails characteristically have a coefficient of lift (C_{L}) and coefficient of drag (C_{D}) for each apparent wind angle. The planform, curvature and area of a given sail are dominant determinants of each coefficient.

=== Sail terminology ===
Sails are classified as "triangular sails", "quadrilateral fore-and-aft sails" (gaff-rigged, etc.), and "square sails". The top of a triangular sail, the head, is raised by a halyard, The forward lower corner of the sail, the tack, is shackled to a fixed point on the boat in a manner to allow pivoting about that point—either on a mast, e.g. for a mainsail, or on the deck, e.g. for a jib or staysail. The trailing lower corner, the clew, is positioned with an outhaul on a boom or directly with a sheet, absent a boom. Symmetrical sails have two clews, which may be adjusted forward or back.

The windward edge of a sail is called the luff, the trailing edge, the leach, and the bottom edge the foot. On symmetrical sails, either vertical edge may be presented to windward and, therefore, there are two leaches. On sails attached to a mast and boom, these edges may be curved, when laid on a flat surface, to promote both horizontal and vertical curvature in the cross-section of the sail, once attached. The use of battens allows a sail have an arc of material on the leech, beyond a line drawn from the head to the clew, called the roach.

=== Lift variables ===
As with aircraft wings, the two dominant factors affecting sail efficiency are its planform—primarily sail width versus sail height, expressed as an aspect ratio—and cross-sectional curvature or draft.

==== Aspect ratio ====
In aerodynamics, the aspect ratio of a sail is the ratio of its length to its breadth (chord). A high aspect ratio indicates a long, narrow sail, whereas a low aspect ratio indicates a short, wide sail. For most sails, the length of the chord is not a constant but varies along the wing, so the aspect ratio AR is defined as the square of the sail height b divided by the area A of the sail planform:

$$AR = {b^2 \over A}$$

Aspect ratio and planform can be used to predict the aerodynamic performance of a sail. For a given sail area, the aspect ratio, which is proportional to the square of the sail height, is of particular significance in determining lift-induced drag, and is used to calculate the induced drag coefficient of a sail $C_{Di}\;$:

$$C_{Di} = \frac{(C_L)^2}{\pi e AR}$$

where $e\;$ is the Oswald efficiency number that accounts for the variable sail shapes. This formula demonstrates that a sail's induced drag coefficient decreases with increased aspect ratio.

==== Sail curvature ====
The horizontal curvature of a sail is termed "draft" and corresponds to the camber of an airfoil. Increasing the draft generally increases the sail's lift force. The Royal Yachting Association categorizes draft by depth and by the placement of the maximum depth as a percentage of the distance from the luff to the leach. Sail draft is adjusted for wind speed to achieve a flatter sail (less draft) in stronger winds and a fuller sails (more draft) in lighter winds. Staysails and sails attached to a mast (e.g. a mainsail) have different, but similar controls to achieve draft depth and position. On a staysail, tightening the luff with the halyard helps flatten the sail and adjusts the position of maximum draft. On a mainsail curving the mast to fit the curvature of the luff helps flatten the sail. Depending on wind strength, Dellenbaugh offers the following advice on setting the draft of a sailboat mainsail:

- For light air (less than 8 knots), the sail is at its fullest with the depth of draft between 13 and 16% of the cord and maximum fullness 50% aft from the luff.
- For medium air (8–15 knots), the mainsail has minimal twist with a depth of draft set between 11 and 13% of the cord and maximum fullness 45% aft from the luff.
- For heavy (greater than15 knots), the sail is flattened and allowed to twist in a manner that dumps lift with a depth of draft set between 9 and 12% of cord and maximum fullness 45% aft of the luff.

Plots by Larsson et al show that draft is a much more significant factor affecting sail propulsive force than the position of maximum draft.

Coefficients of propulsive forces and heeling forces as a function of draft (camber) depth or position.

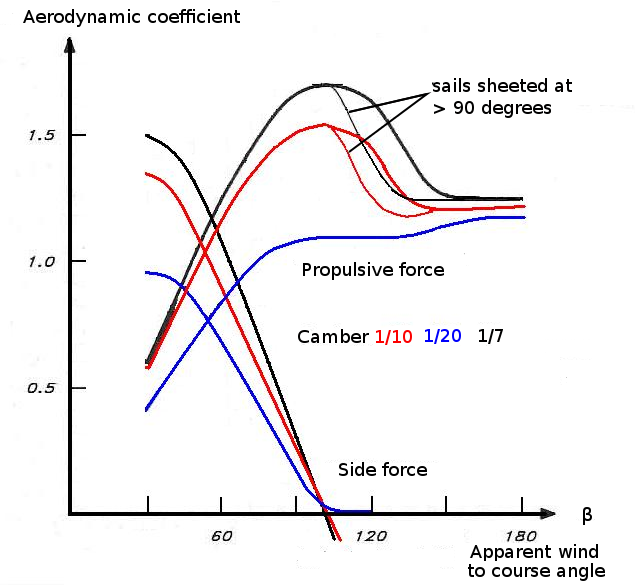
Draft depth.

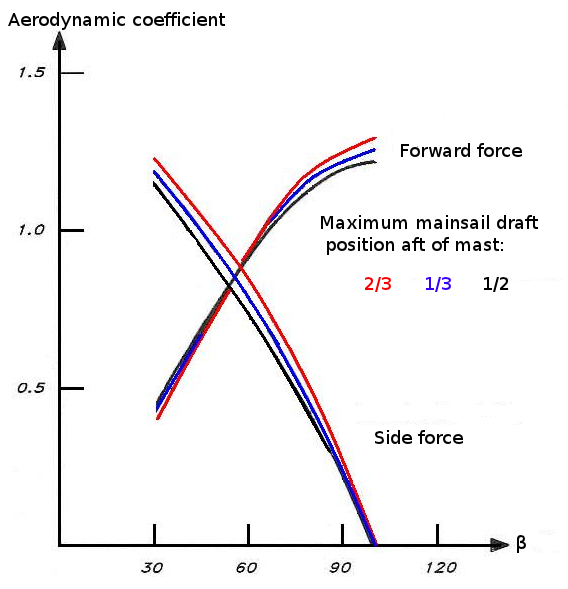
Position of maximum draft from the luff.

The primary tool for adjusting mainsail shape is mast bend; a straight mast increases draft and lift; a curved mast decreases draft and lift—the backstay tensioner is a primary tool for bending the mast. Secondary tools for sail shape adjustment are the mainsheet, traveler, outhaul, and Cunningham.

=== Drag variables ===
Spinnakers have traditionally been optimized to mobilize drag as a more important propulsive component than lift. As sailing craft are able to achieve higher speeds, whether on water, ice or land, the velocity made good (VMG) at a given course off the wind occurs at apparent wind angles that are increasingly further forward with speed. This suggests that the optimum VMG for a given course may be in a regime where a spinnaker may be providing significant lift. Traditional displacement sailboats may at times have optimum VMG courses close to downwind; for these the dominant force on sails is from drag. According to Kimball, C_{D} ≈ 4/3 for most sails with the apparent wind angle astern, so drag force on a downwind sail becomes substantially a function of area and wind speed, approximated as follows:

$D \approx \tfrac23\rho {V_A}^2 A$

== Measurement and computation tools ==
Sail design relies on empirical measurements of pressures and their resulting forces on sails, which validate modern analysis tools, including computational fluid dynamics.

=== Measurement of pressure on the sail ===
Modern sail design and manufacture employs wind tunnel studies, full-scale experiments, and computer models as a basis for efficiently harnessing forces on sails.

Instruments for measuring air pressure effects in wind tunnel studies of sails include pitot tubes, which measure air speed and manometers, which measure static pressures and atmospheric pressure (static pressure in undisturbed flow). Researchers plot pressure across the windward and leeward sides of test sails along the chord and calculate pressure coefficients (static pressure difference over wind-induced dynamic pressure).

Research results describe airflow around the sail and in the boundary layer. Wilkinson, modelling the boundary layer in two dimensions, described nine regions around the sail:

1. Upper mast attached airflow.
2. Upper separation bubble.
3. Upper reattachment region.
4. Upper aerofoil attached flow region.
5. Trailing edge separation region.
6. Lower mast attached flow region.
7. Lower separation bubble.
8. Lower reattachment region.
9. Lower aerofoil attached flow region.

=== Analysis ===
Sail design differs from wing design in several respects, especially since on a sail air flow varies with wind and boat motion and sails are usually deformable airfoils, sometimes with a mast for a leading edge. Often simplifying assumptions are employed when making design calculations, including: a flat travel surface—water, ice or land, constant wind velocity and unchanging sail adjustment.

The analysis of the forces on sails takes into account the aerodynamic surface force, its centre of effort on a sail, its direction, and its variable distribution over the sail. Modern analysis employs fluid mechanics and aerodynamics airflow calculations for sail design and manufacture, using aeroelasticity models, which combine computational fluid dynamics and structural analysis. Secondary effects pertaining to turbulence and separation of the boundary layer are secondary factors. Computational limitations persist. Theoretical results require empirical confirmation with wind tunnel tests on scale models and full-scale testing of sails. Velocity prediction programs combine elements of hydrodynamic forces (mainly drag) and aerodynamic forces (lift and drag) to predict sailboat performance at various windspeed for all points of sail

== See also ==
- Sail
- Sailing
- Sailcloth
- Point of sail
- Polar diagram (sailing)
- Sail-plan
- Rigging
- Wing
- Sail twist
- High-performance sailing
- Stays (nautical)
- Sheet (sailing)
