= Łukasz Zakrzewski =

Polish sailor

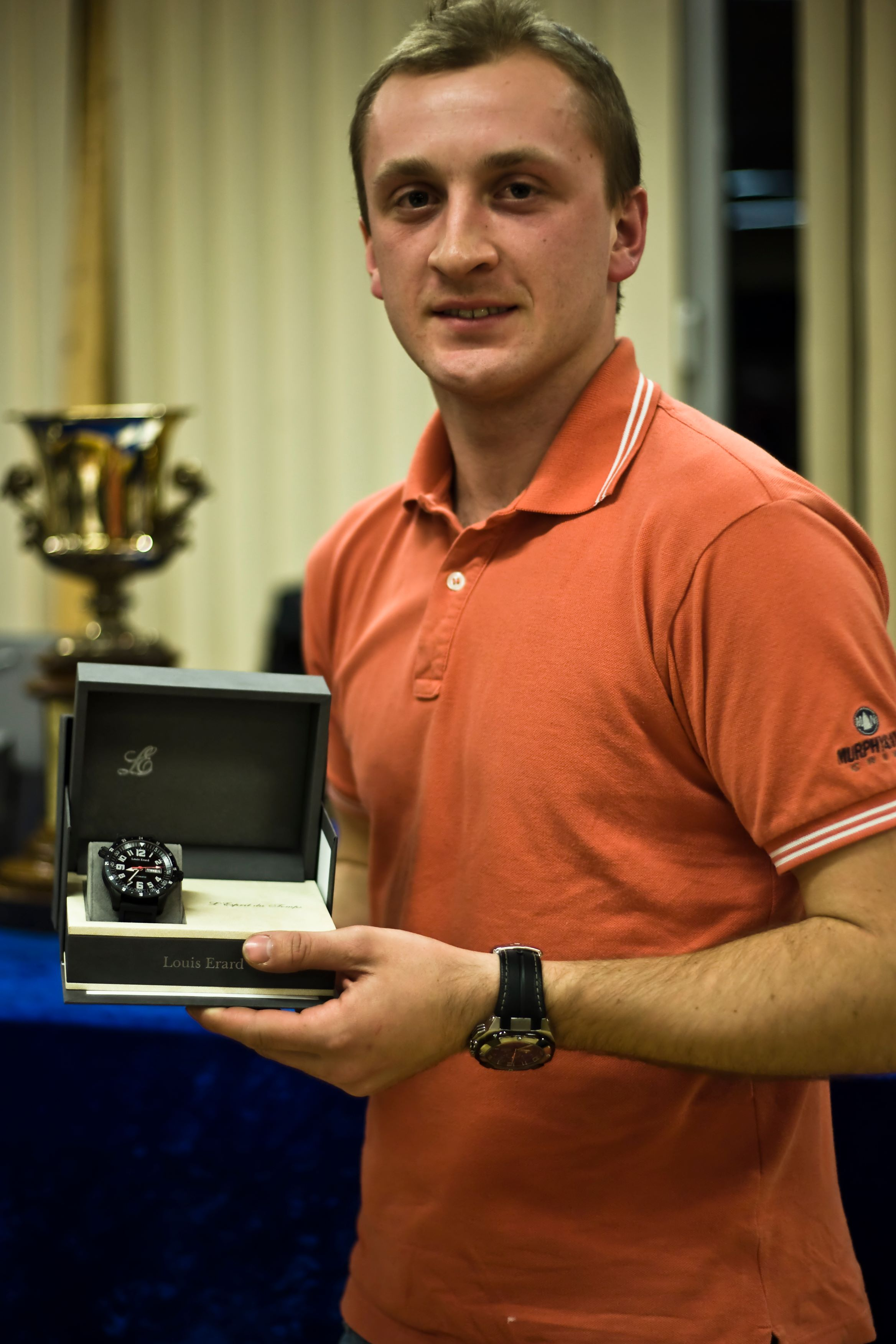
Łukasz Zakrzewski

Łukasz Zakrzewski (born 1984) is a Polish sailor and ice sailor.

Zakrzewski is a member of Mazurski Klub Żeglarski Mikołajki team. He started ice-boating at age 7. He is a senior world vice-champion (2006 World Championships), junior world vice-champion and junior European vice-champion in sailing.

== Achievements ==
Rank	Year	Event	Class
1st	1997	Polish Championships	Ice Optimist
2nd	1998	Polish Championships	Ice Optimist
1st	1999	Younger Junior Polish Championships	International DN
1st	2001	Younger Junior Polish Championships	International DN
5th	2002	Junior World Championships (Estonia)	International DN
2nd	2003	Junior World and European Championships (Estonia)	International DN
2nd	2003	Junior Polish Championships	International DN
3rd	2004	Junior Polish Championships	International DN
3rd	2004	Grand Prix Intercomerce in Mikołajki	Omega
4th	2005	Junior World and European Championships (Poland)	International DN
2nd	2005	Junior Polish Championships	International DN
3rd	2005	Grand Prix Intercomerce in Mikołajki	Omega
2nd	2006	Senior World Championships	International DN
1st	2006	Grand Prix Intercomerce in Mikołajki	Omega
