= Broadseam =

Broadseam is a term particular to the making of a sail. The panels that make up the sections of a sail are cut with curves on the connecting edges or seams. This method adds a three dimensional shape to what would ordinarily be a flat triangular or quadrilateral piece of fabric. Since a sail is a type of airfoil, this method of sail making adds significantly to the amount of draft a sail can have.
