= Polar diagram =

A polar diagram could refer to:

- Polar area diagram, a type of pie chart
- Radiation pattern, in antenna theory
- A diagram based on polar coordinates
  - Radar chart
- Spherical coordinate system, the three-dimensional form of a polar response curve
- In sailing, a Polar diagram is a graph that shows a sailing boats potential wind speed over a range of wind and sail angles.
- Graph which contrasts the sink rate of an aircraft with its horizontal speed (polar curve).
