= Icicle (yacht) =

Ice yacht built in 1869

Icicle is the name of the largest ice yacht ever built. It was built for John Aspinwall Roosevelt for racing on the Hudson River, New York state in 1869. It was 21 metres (68 ft 11 in) long and carried 99 square metres (1,070 sq ft) of canvas. The yacht is still, over 140 years later, recognized by the Guinness Book of Records as a world record.

John A. Roosevelt (Franklin Delano Roosevelt's Uncle) was the first Commodore of the Hudson River Ice Yacht Club (1885) at Poughkeepsie, NY. His ice yacht, "Icicle", required a railway flat car to transport.

In 1871 "Icicle" beat the "Chicago Express" train on a run between Poughkeepsie and Ossining. Early ice yacht clubs spent most of their time racing trains.
