= Erik von Holst =

Estonian sailor

Erik von Holst (30 August 1894, in Vaivara Parish, Estonia – 31 May 1962, in Eutin, West Germany) was an Estonian/German sailor and ice sailor who represented Estonia in the 1936 Summer Olympics in the men's olympic monotype class. He also designed and constructed the International Monotype-XV ice yacht.
