= Draft (sail) =

Degree of curvature of a sail in a horizontal cross-section

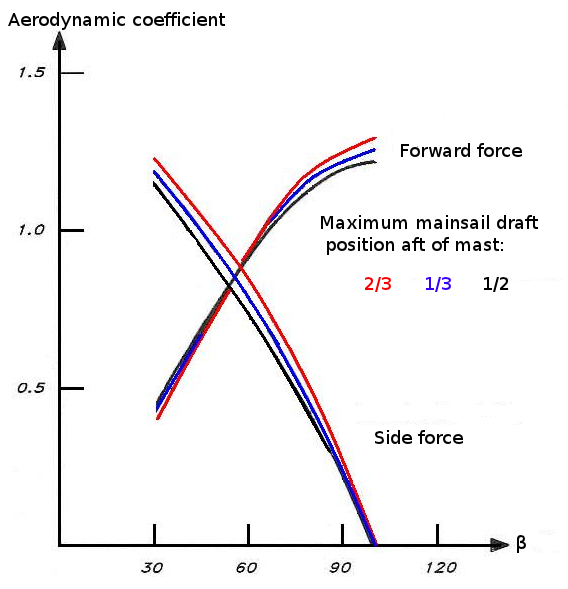
Influence of mainsail draft position on forward and side force

In nautical parlance, the draft or draught of a sail refers to the amount and shape of curvature in a horizontal cross-section. Any sail experiences a force from the prevailing wind just because it impedes the air's passage. A sail with draft also functions as an airfoil when set at an angle slightly greater than the angle of the wind, producing lift which then propels the vessel.

The word "belly" is also used in reference to the draft of a sail (i.e. "More belly in the main sail.").

== See also ==
- Forces on sails
- Sail components
