= Velocity prediction program =

Yacht speed computer program

A velocity prediction program (VPP) is a computer program which solves for the performance of a sailing yacht in various wind conditions by balancing hull and sail forces. VPPs are used by yacht designers, boat builders, model testers, sailors, sailmakers, also America's Cup teams, to predict the performance of a sailboat before it has been built or prior to major modifications.

== Background ==
The first VPP was developed at the Massachusetts Institute of Technology during the early 1970s when Commodore H. Irving Pratt funded research to predict the performance "of a sailing yacht, given knowledge of its hull, rig and sailplan geometry".

== Methodology ==
VPPs are iterative programs which require educated guesses of initial parameters to begin operating. Generally VPPs are composed of two mechanisms, a boat model and a solution algorithm.

Initial guesses of parameters including boat speed (V_{s}), heel angle (Φ), number of reefs and sail flatness are input into the boat model. Using these input parameters the solution algorithm calculates the difference between the propulsive force of the sails and the resistive force of the hull. It also calculates the righting moment created by the hull and the operational heel angle.

Since the propulsive force and the resistive force are not likely to be equal on the first iteration, the solution algorithm has the responsibility of adjusting the input parameters and balancing the forces until it produces the maximum possible speed at each true wind angle.

=== Hydrodynamic force model ===
The resistive forces acting on a hull and its appendages (keel, rudder and other fins) can be broken down into a number of smaller components.

1. Viscous drag – This type of drag is also known as "skin friction" as it is thought to derive entirely from the frictional resistance of water molecules imposing a force as they slide past the wetted surface of the hull and its appendages. This type of drag scales proportionally to wetted surface and is one of the two constitutive components of hull resistance.
2. Residuary resistance – Residuary resistance includes all other remaining types of resistance on an upright, bare hull in calm water. The reason for this grouping is that of all the types of hydrodynamic resistance imposed upon a boat hull in motion, only viscous drag can be cleanly isolated, as it scales proportionally to wetted surface area. Residuary resistance, then, is composed primarily of wave-making resistance, eddy formation and large-scale separation, all of which are too complex to be determined empirically given prior knowledge of hull geometry. These types of resistance can only be determined by model testing.
3. Induced drag – Induced drag is a result of an imperfect, or non-infinite, lifting surface (in this case the keel, rudder and any other appendages.) When lift is generated in three dimensions, a closed circulation loop is formed which creates downwash. This downwash alters the free stream velocity, by rotating it downward, towards the downwash. This new angle results in a small increase in resistance as it has a component in the direction of the free stream.
4. Heel induced drag – When a sailing yacht heels, there are adjustments which need to be made to the base resistance of the hull due to the modified hull geometry, all of which are captured by this term. The first change is the wetted surface area of the hull, which will result in a greater viscous drag if increased. More significantly, however, are the changes in residuary resistance when heeled. The underwater portion of the hull will no longer be symmetric and will usually result in increased residuary resistance. This is particularly true if there are major changes to the beam to draft ratio or the longitudinal center of buoyancy.
5. Added resistance in waves (R_{AW}) – This element represents the computationally or experimentally derived resistance due to the motion of a yacht in a seaway. This resistance can be considered to be a factor either of true wind speed (V_{T}) or of physical characteristics of the yacht.

=== Aerodynamic force model ===
1. Lift from sails
2. Drag on sails
3. Induced drag

=== Solving and optimization ===
VPPs solve for the performance of a yacht by resolving all forces and moments acting on the yacht. Pitching and yawing moments can be assumed to be zero for simplicity.

=== Presentation ===
VPPs produce a great deal a data, so the presentation of this data requires special consideration. While tabular output can be valuable for identifying specific values, the most common way to present VPP output is with a polar plot.

== Uses ==
=== Sailing yacht handicapping ===
VPPs are used by a variety of sailing organizations to assess theoretical boat performance and then assign "handicaps" to allow boats of different styles and sizes to race against one another. The IOR and IMS handicapping rules were some of the earliest adopters of VPPs. In the United States, the most common handicapping rule is the PHRF rule, developed and promoted by the United States Sailing Association. While most other rules do not take past performance into account, PHRF differentiates itself by allowing skippers to request handicap reductions after a series of poor racing results. In Europe, the most common handicapping system used today is the IRC rule.

== Commercial VPPs ==
- WinDesign
- AHVPP
- Sailfish Yacht Analyzer

== See also ==
- International Offshore Rule
- International Rule
- Polar diagram (sailing)
- Universal Rule
