= Polar diagram (sailing) =

Graph showing sailboat's potential speed given wind speed and angle

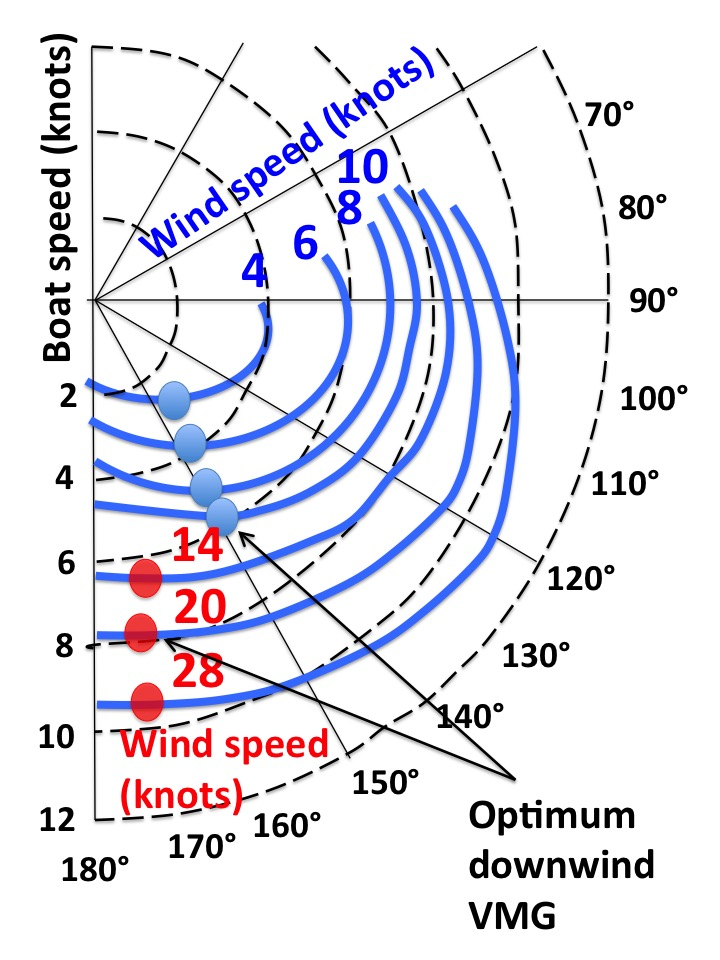
Downwind polar diagram to determine potential yacht speeds at various wind speeds for a sailboat.

A polar diagram, or polar plot, or simply "polar", is a graph that shows a sailboat's potential speed over a range of wind speeds and relative wind angles. It normally consists of the right side of a line chart with the radius representing the yacht speed and the angle representing the apparent wind angle relative to the yacht's direction of travel. (That is, the boat is proceeding in the 0° direction, or "up" in the diagram.) Several lines are normally drawn on the chart representing wind speed. To identify how fast a yacht could potentially go you select a particular wind speed curve and particular wind angle. Refer to the graph to the right for an example.

Polar diagrams are normally specific to a particular sailboat design and are created by the yacht designer. Polar diagrams can also be created using a velocity prediction program or from real-world performance data by a range of computer programs including iPolar and iRegatta.

== See also ==
- Forces on sails
