= Kiteboarding (disambiguation) =

Kiteboarding is a water-based, kite-powered sport Kiteboarding may also refer to:

- Snowkiting, a snow based, kite powered sport
- Kite landboarding, a land based, kite powered sport using a four-wheeled board

== See also ==
- Windsport
