= Iceboat =

Sailing craft for ice

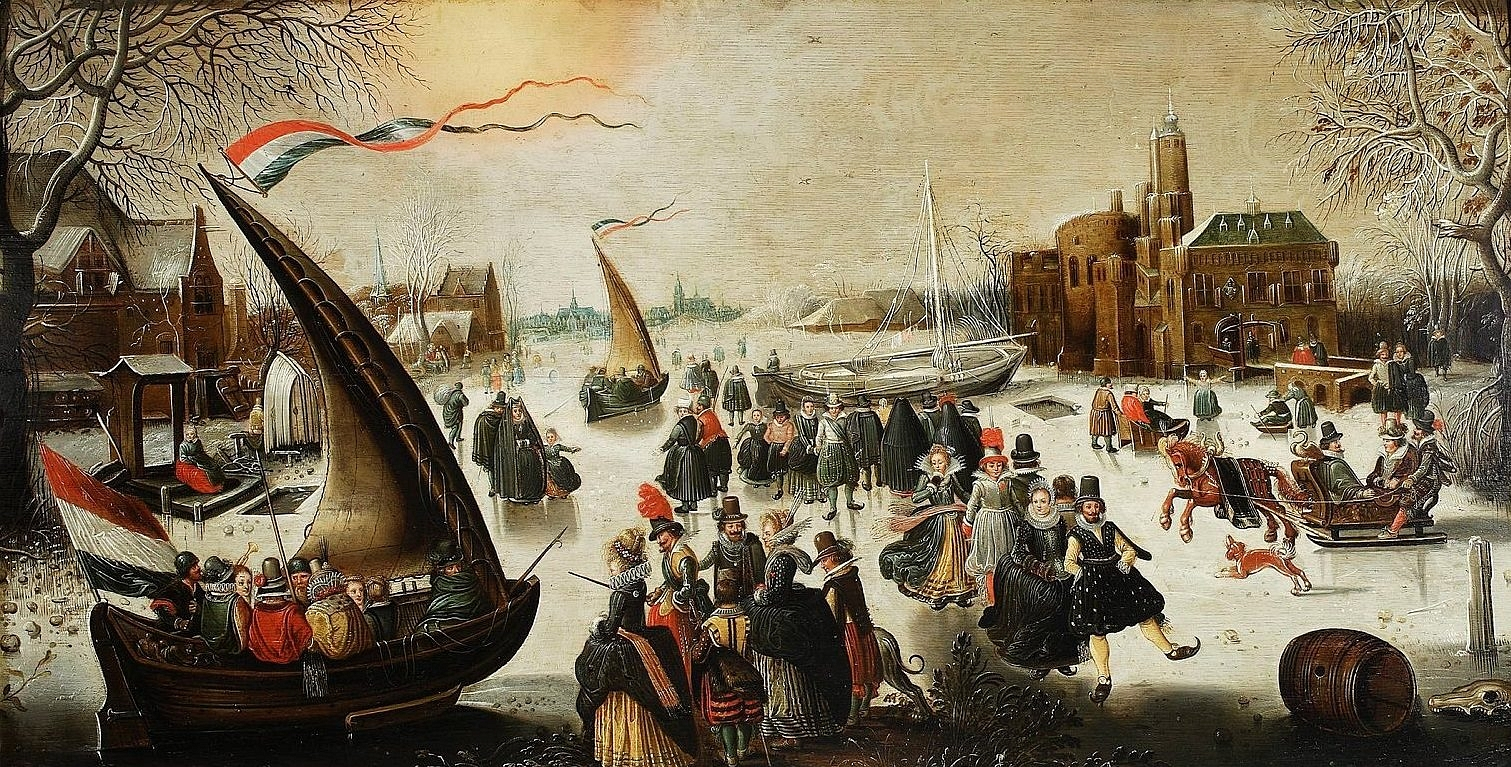
David Vinckboons: Landscape with skaters (cca. 1615), 17th century boer type iceboats

Boer Ice sailing in the Netherlands in 1938.

An iceboat (occasionally spelled ice boat or traditionally called an ice yacht) is a recreational or competition sailing craft supported on metal runners for traveling over ice. One of the runners is steerable. Originally, such craft were boats with a support structure, riding on the runners and steered with a rear blade, as with a conventional rudder. As iceboats evolved, the structure became a frame with a seat or cockpit for the iceboat sailor, resting on runners. Steering was shifted to the front.

Because of their low resistance to forward motion over ice, iceboats are capable of speeds exceeding 60 miles per hour (100 km/h). Because of their speed, iceboats are used both for recreation and for racing. Racing craft typically carry one person.

A related activity, land sailing, employs sailing craft similar to iceboats, but riding on wheels instead of runners.

== History ==
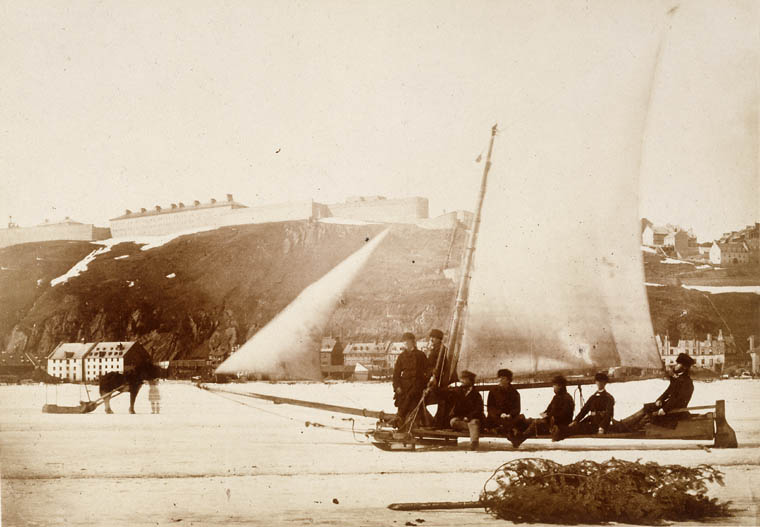
Ice boat on Saint Lawrence River, Quebec City, c. 1858–1860

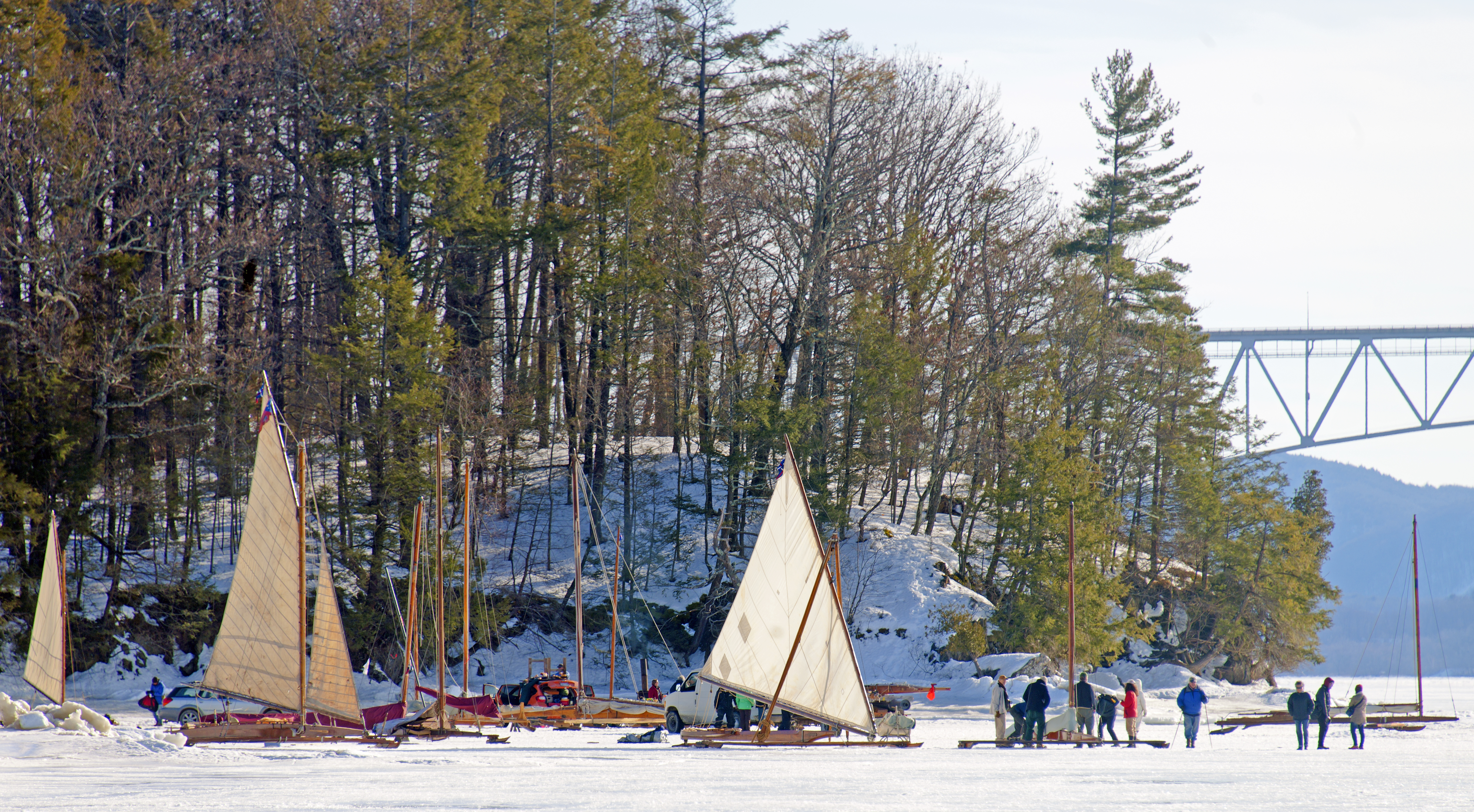
Classic iceboats on the Hudson River at Barrytown, NY

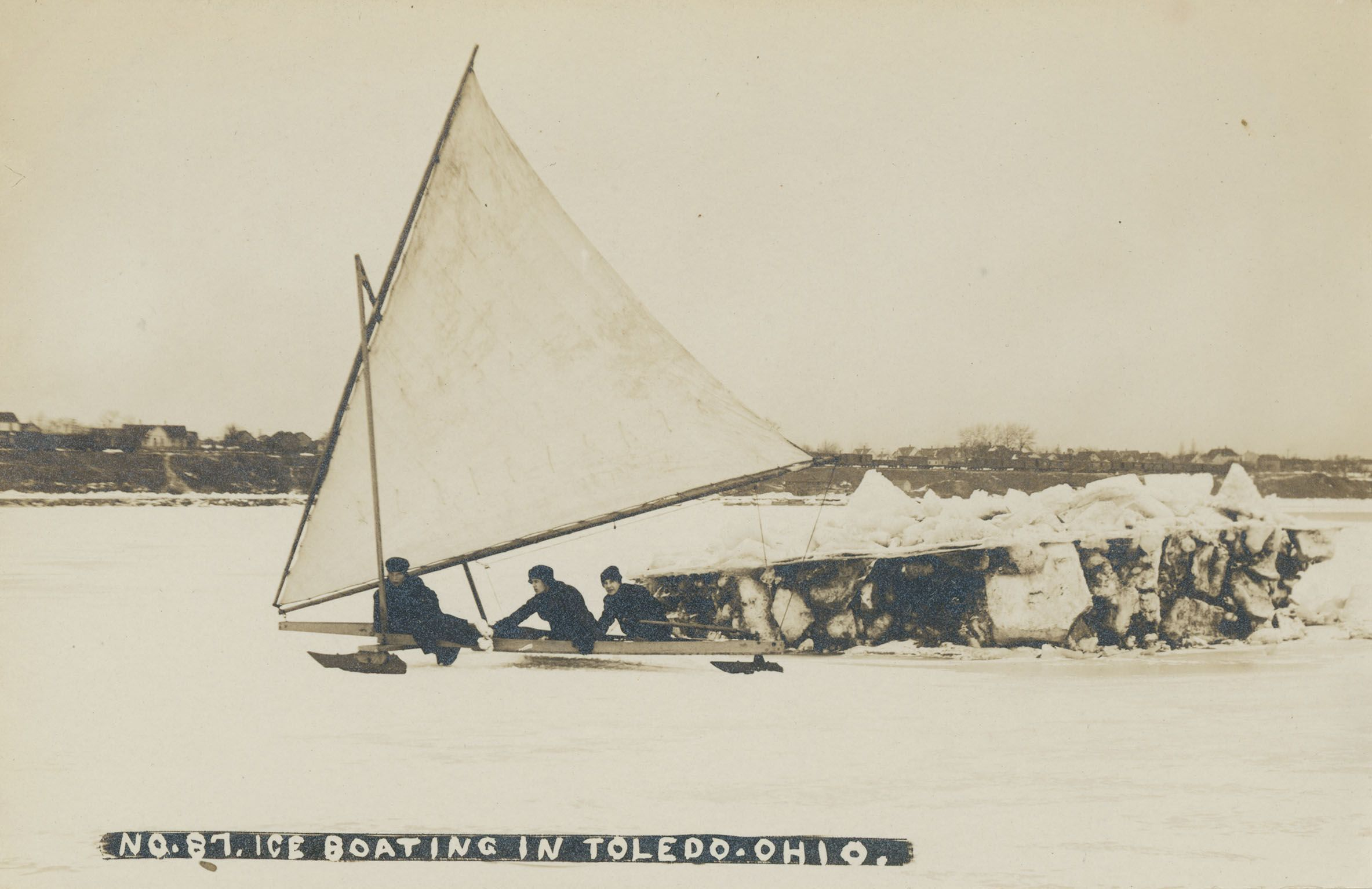
Ice Boating in Toledo, Ohio

The history of iceboating began in Europe in areas where smooth ice was found in the bays of the Baltic Sea and the canals of the Netherlands during the Little Ice Age. Initially boats were used for commerce, but soon evolved into pleasure craft—"ice yachts". Ice sailing came to North America, where the sailing craft evolved into recreational and racing versions.

=== Venues ===
Iceboating began in the 17th century as a documented means of transport on the frozen Gulf of Riga and the canals of the Netherlands into the 18th century. Ice boats carried cargo on Dutch canals during the 17th century.

The first iceboats were introduced on New York State's Hudson River in the United States in 1790, where the practice flourished as a sport. The first recorded boat, built in 1790 by Oliver Booth of Poughkeepsie, was a square box atop three runners, the two forward runners being nailed to the box and the third acted as a rudder operated by a tiller. This type of craft was accessible to sportsmen of modest means.

In the mid-19th century, two "ice yachting" clubs had formed, the Poughkeepsie Ice Yacht Club (1865) and the Hudson River Ice Yacht Club (1870), where wealthy boat owners sailed large iceboats with up to seven crew members. Boats were as long as 69 feet (21 m) and sailed as fast as 107 miles per hour (172 km/h), a record exceeding any other conveyance in 1885, set by the Icicle. The first American Challenge Pennant occurred in 1881 on the Hudson river with five ice-yacht clubs competing. Races were sailed five times around a triangular course with one-mile legs, two of which were to windward. Iceboats were divided into four classes with sail areas ranging from less than 300 square feet to over 600 square feet.

By the beginning of the 20th century, iceboating had spread to Minnesota (Lake Minnetonka and White Bear Lake), Wisconsin (Lake Winnebago and Lake Pepin), Michigan (Lake St. Clair), and venues in Maine and Vermont. In Canada, there were venues on Lake Ontario (Kingston) and the Saint Lawrence River.

A European ice sailing club formed first in Sweden (1901), followed by the European Ice Yachting Union, which formed in 1928 with member states Latvia, Lithuania, Estonia, Sweden, Austria, and Germany.

=== Evolution of design ===
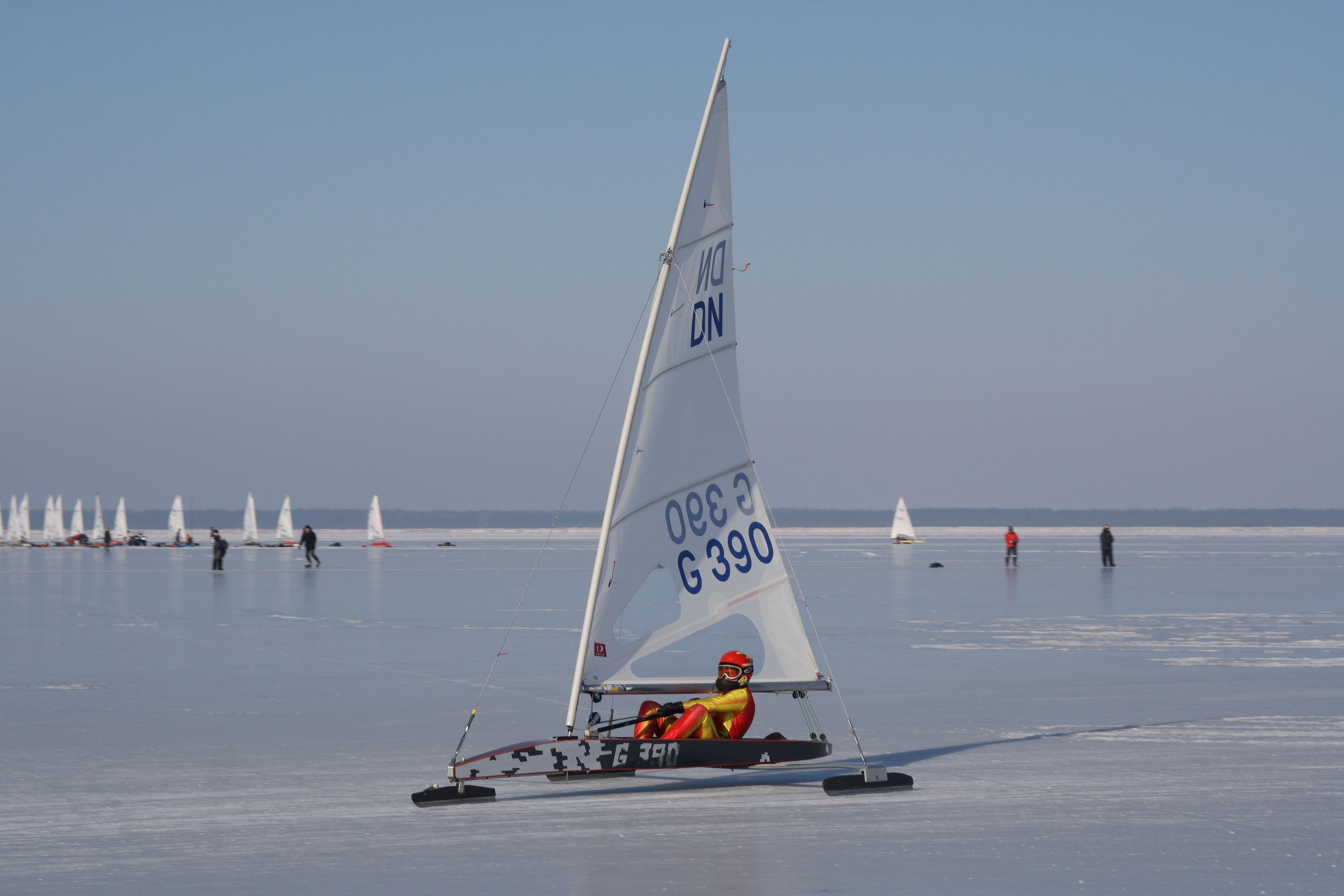
An iceboat at the 2011 DN European Championships in Nasva, Estonia

17th-century Dutch ice yachts consisted of flat-bottomed sailboats atop a cross-wise plank, resting on outboard metal runners, which carried the bulk of the weight of the craft. At the stern was a steering runner, attached to a rudder-like structure. to which are affixed four steel runners, one each at bow, stern and each end of the planking. These boats used conventional gaff mainsails and jibs, attached to the mast by travellers. A tiller or wheel stern controls the steering runner.

Iceboat on Gull Lake, Michigan

In the 19th century iceboats evolved into a box, riding on cross-pieces, supported by runners. These "stern-steerer" iceboats were generally rigged as sloops, with a jib sail forward of the mast, although the catboat style with a single sail was also used. In 1879 the archetypical Hudson River iceboat began to emerge. The Robert Scott, designed and built by H. Relyea, had a single backbone and wire guy-ropes. The mast on subsequent boats were stepped further forward than in the past with shortened jibs were shortened and the center of effort and resistance brought into balance, aligning both with the main runners. The shallow cockpit box became elliptical. A few "Class A'' stern steerers with at least

250 square feet (23 m^{2}) of sail area survived in to the late 20th century.

In the early 1900s some smaller iceboats, called scooters, were designed to traverse both ice and water with a shallow, oval 15×5 feet (4.6×1.5 m) hull on fixed runners. These sailing craft were steered by manipulating the sails, there being no rudder.

The traditional stern-steerer boats were largely replaced by front steering boats in the 1930s, following the development of this style by Walter Beauvois of Williams Bay, Wisconsin in a boat named the Beau Skeeter. This boat led to the "Skeeter" class, and the Skeeter Ice Boat Club formed on Geneva Lake, Wisconsin. The Skeeter class adopted the logo of a mosquito on their sail, and has evolved into an aerodynamically clean machine. The Skeeter class is limited to just 75 square feet (7.0 m^{2}) of sail.

In 1937, The Detroit News sponsored a new home-buildable ice boat design, which became the International DN. In 1968 Dick Slates of Pewaukee, Wisconsin designed and built the Nite with two wooden prototypes. The design was refined and fiberglass production began in 1970.

== Speed ==
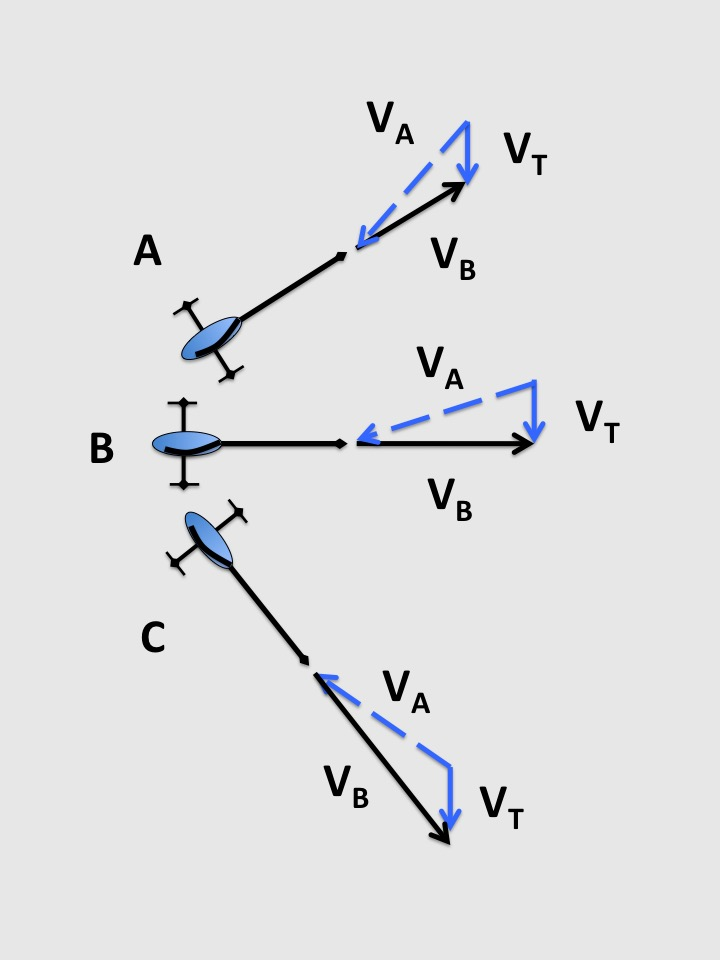
Diagram of apparent wind (V_{A}) on an iceboat on different points of sail

Iceboats designs dating from the mid 20th century onwards typically consist of a triangular or cross-shaped frame, supported by three skate blades called "runners", with the steering runner in front. Runners are made of iron or steel with sharpened edges, which hold onto the ice, preventing slippage sideways from the lateral force of the wind developed by the sails, as they develop propulsive lift. Given their low forward resistance, iceboats can sail up to five times the speed of the true wind. Because the velocity of the iceboat (V_{B}) is so much greater than the true wind velocity (V_{T}), the apparent wind (V_{A}) is only a few degrees from the direction of travel on most points of sail and the sail is close-hauled in each. V_{A} is generated by the combination of iceboat velocity (V_{B}) and true wind velocity (V_{T}).

=== Attainable speeds ===
Different classes of iceboat can achieve speeds, as follow.

- International DN: 55–68 miles per hour (89–109 km/h).
- Skeeter: 84 miles per hour (135 km/h).
- Classic iceboats: While claimed speeds for such craft have been as high as 140 miles per hour (230 km/h) in the early 20th century, other sources cast doubt on both the technology for achieving and for measuring such speeds at those times.

=== Race courses ===
Because of the high boat speeds, iceboat race courses are established around fixed marks which are to be rounded in a one-way route, enhancing boat-to-boat traffic safety. The courses are a straight line upwind and downwind, which necessitates tacking upwind and jibing downwind.

== Classes ==
Among the classes of iceboat are sailing craft that have associations in Europe and North America: IceOptimist, International DN, and Monotype XV. Others are regional in North America: Nite, Renegade, and Skeeter.

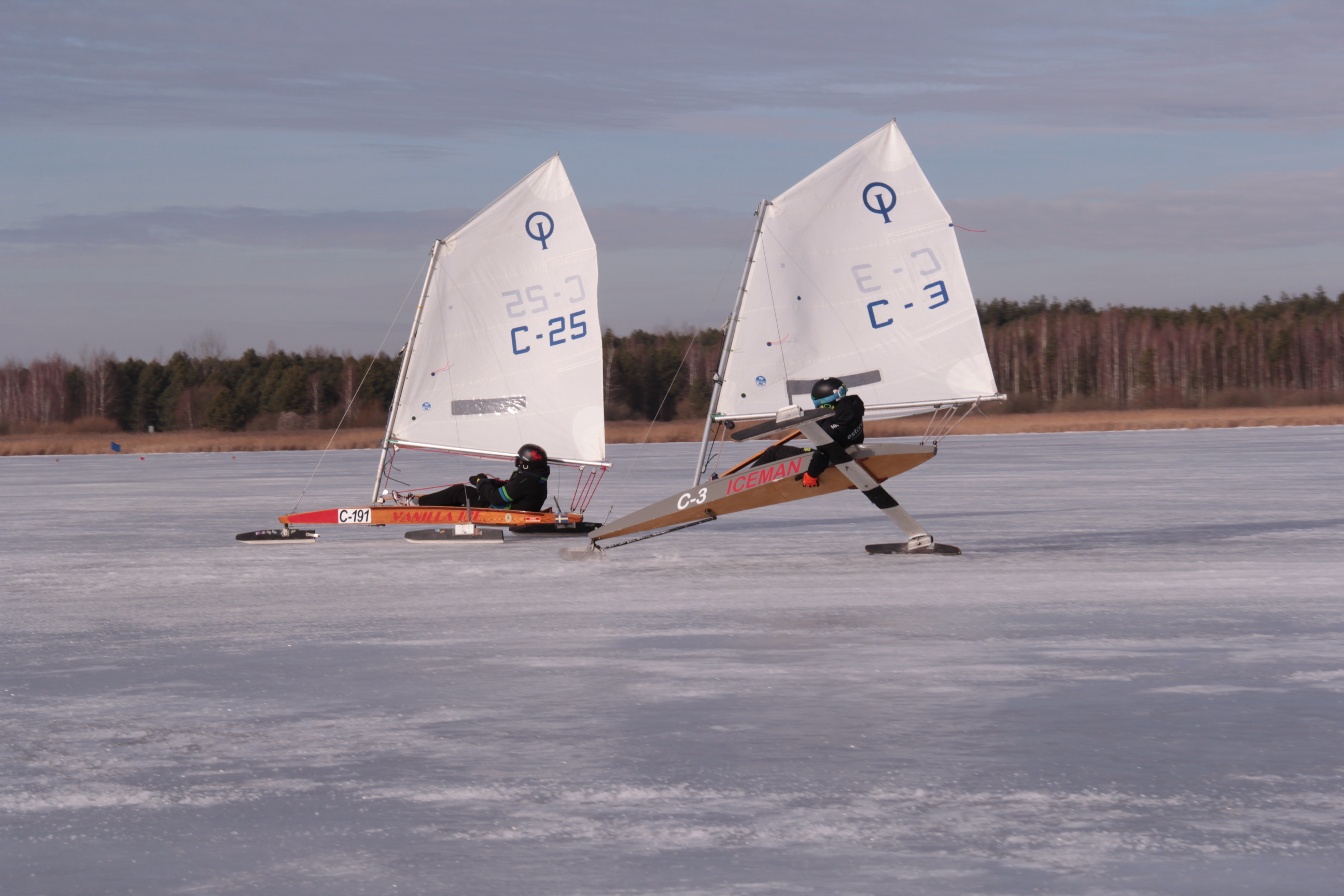
IceOptimists

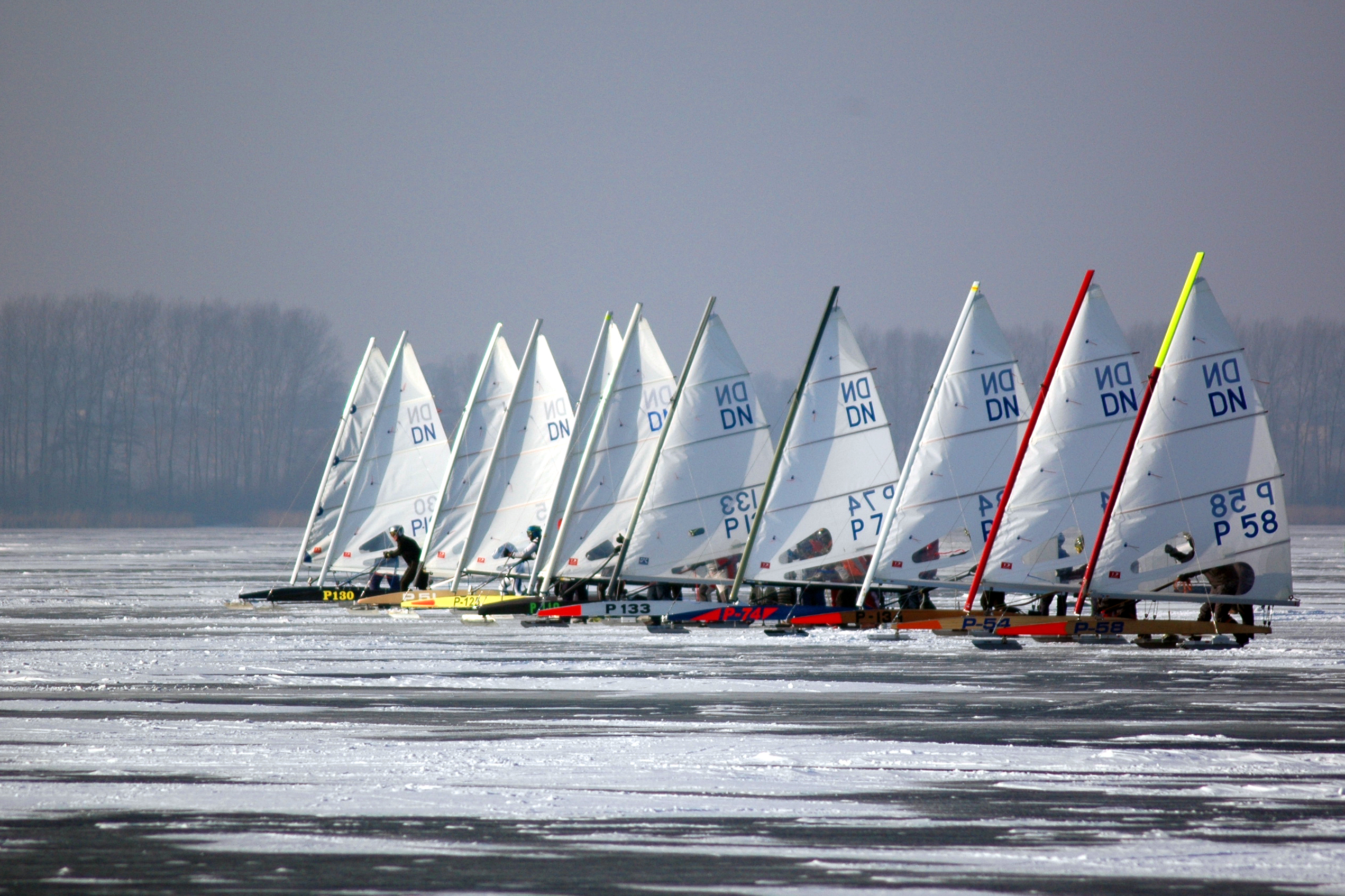
International DN class iceboats at the start of a race in Znin, Poland

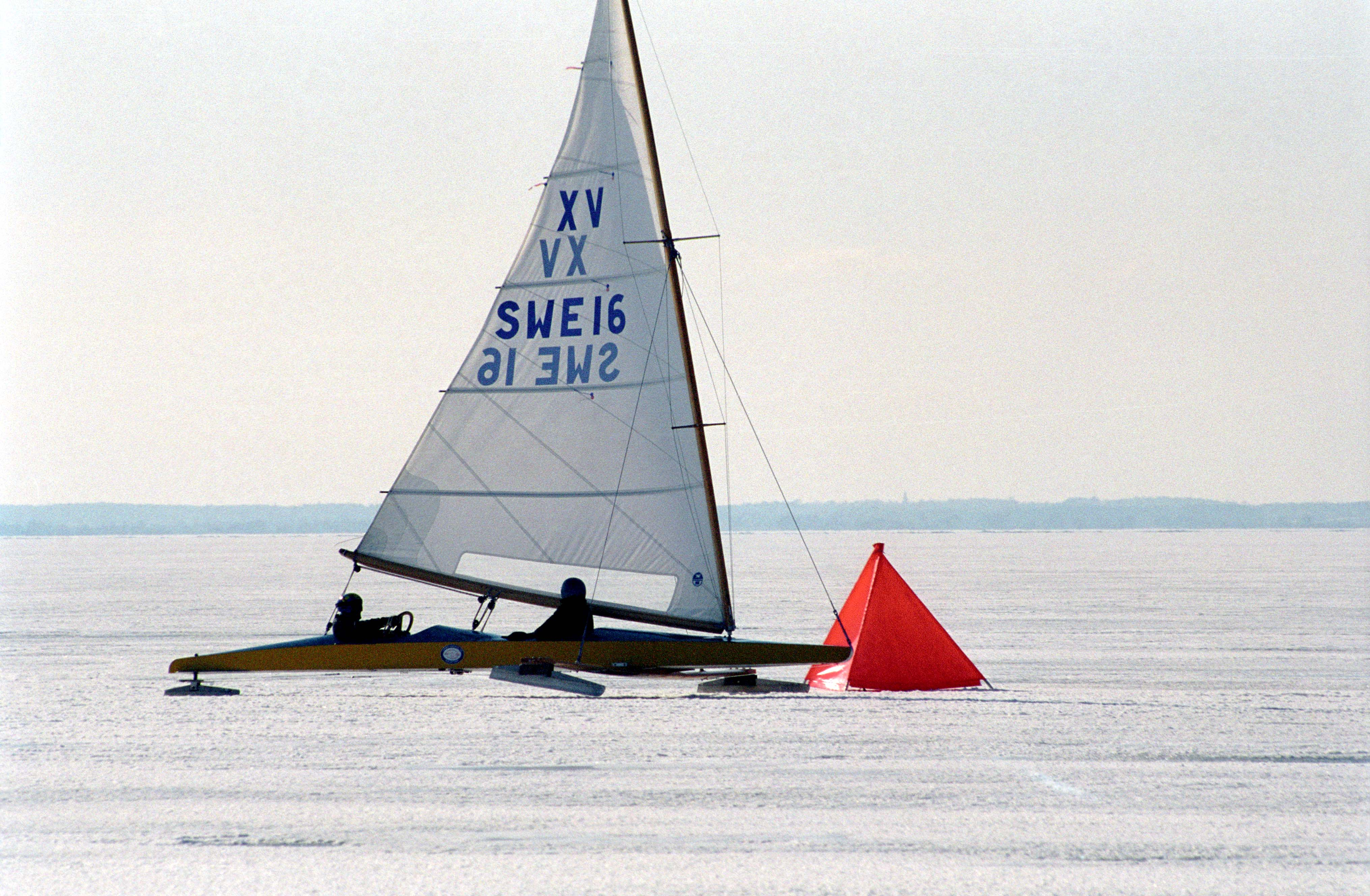
Monotype XV

=== IceOptimist ===
The IceOptimist is a youth iceboat class that uses the sails and the rig of the International Optimist dinghy. The first design was built in Estonia in 1978, with scaled-down elements of a DN. In 2002, the class was registered under the guardianship of IDNIYRA Europe with the permission of IODA. World and European Championships are sailed each winter with a fleet of approximately 40 racers.

=== International DN ===
The International DN class is the most popular class in both North America, Europe and Asia. It is a one-person wood boat twelve feet long with a cross-plank eight feet long that carries a mast 16 feet (4.88 m) high. Modern competitive DNs use flexible masts commonly made of composite materials. The DN 60 derives its name from the 1937 request of The Detroit News for a high-performance, inexpensive, home-built iceboat design. Modern DNs share many one-design features with the original boat, including the basic aerodynamic fuselage design, runner configurations and 60 square feet (5.6 m^{2}) of high-performance sail.

=== Monotype XV ===
The Monotype XV is a class of stern-steering iceboat based on a 1932 design by an Estonian, Erik von Holst. It may be single or double-handed. The One-Design class is built according to close specifications, little changed since the 1930s. It is the largest one-design iceboat class in Europe and the only double-handed iceboat class for which there are international championships. The 205-kilogram (452 lb) is 7.5×4.2 metres (25×14 ft) in length and width with a 7.2-metre (24 ft) high mast.

=== Nite ===
Nite is a class of iceboat that has a two-seat side-by-side fiberglass fuselage and a 67-square-foot (6.2 m^{2}) sail. It is constructed according to tight specifications.

=== Renegade ===
The Renegade is a class of home-built iceboat whose prototype appeared in 1947 in Wisconsin, designed by Elmer Millenbach to be carried atop an automobile. Plans were published in 1950. It has a 67-square-foot (6.2 m^{2}) sail on a flexible aerodynamic spar.

=== Skeeter ===
The Skeeter class is divided into sub-classes (A, B and C) all of which are limited to 75 square feet (7.0 m^{2}) of sail area. A-class boats may be single or two-place tandem with a mast that does not exceed 28.5 feet (8.7 m). They may incorporate carbon fiber construction. B-class boats have seats for two (side by side). C-class skeeters may be single or two-place tandem with a mast that does not exceed 20.25 feet (6.17 m).

== See also ==
- Land sailing
- Northumberland Strait iceboat
- Sail boat
- Sailing
