= International DN =

Iceboat class

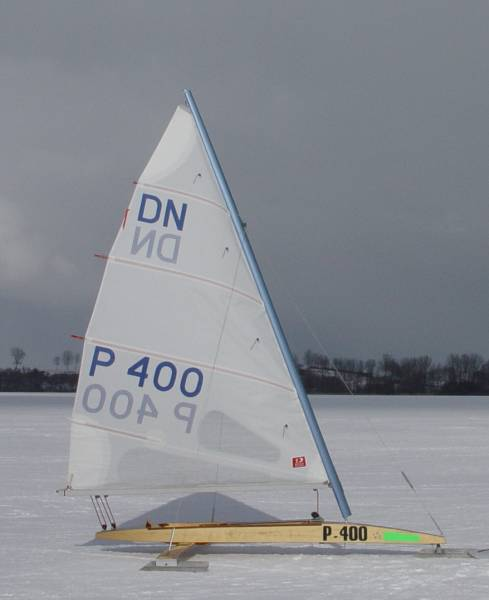
- International DN class in Żnin, Poland

Boat
- Crew: 1

Hull
- Hull weight: 20.4 kg (45 lb)
- LOA: 3.7 m (12 ft)
- Beam: 2.44 m (8 ft 0 in)

Rig
- Mast height: 4.9 m (16 ft)

Sails
- Mainsail area: 5.57 m^{2} (60.0 sq ft)

The International DN is a class of iceboat.

== History ==
The name stands for Detroit News, where the first iceboat of this type was designed and built in the winter of 1936–1937. Archie Arrol was a master craftsman working in the Detroit News hobby shop, and together with iceboaters Joe Lodge and Norman Jarrait designed a racing boat they called the "Blue Streak 60", later to become known as the "DN 60". In 1937 a group of 50 laymen worked with Archie in the hobby shop to produce the first fleet of the new iceboats. These first boats broke during the initial season, and after Jarrait and Lodge modified the design to increase the strength, the group got back together to build a second set of iceboats in 1938.

This design, featuring a narrow, single-person cockpit, three steel blades in tricycle style arrangement and a steeply raked mast, remains to this day the most popular iceboat design in use.

== Configuration ==
The DN is 12 feet (3.7 m) long, with a 21-inch (53 cm) wide cockpit and an 8-foot (2.4 m) wide runner plank. The 16 foot (4.9 m) mast supports 60 square feet (5.6 m^{2}) of sail area. The front runner is typically rigged with a steering rod that connects the runner to a tiller that is mounted just aft of the mast base. The boat weighs around 100 lb (45 kg), and is piloted by a single helmeted sailor.

== Racing ==
The International DN Ice Yacht Racing Association (IDNIYRA) and IDNIYRA-Europe are the governing bodies of the class. They publish standards for boat design and allow enthusiasts to assemble for races and to share good ice locations. The DN is raced extensively in the northern United States, Canada, throughout Europe, and northern Asia with World Championships alternating between North America and Europe each year. In addition to the World Championship, the North American and European Championships count towards a racer's World Ranking.

== Popularity ==
The DN is the world's most popular ice boat for both recreational and racing sailing. It has become so popular over the years as a result of how transportable and fast it is. Unlike in wet water sailing, ice boat regattas are typically announced to take place within a certain region, rather than at a particular lake, so that scouts can find the best ice conditions. The DN is well suited to this arrangement as it is easily carried on a car roof top. A recreational DN with an aluminum mast can sail at three times the wind speed, and a well tuned racing boat, with a carbon fiber mast will go even faster, roughly four times the wind speed.
