= Blokart =

Class of land yacht

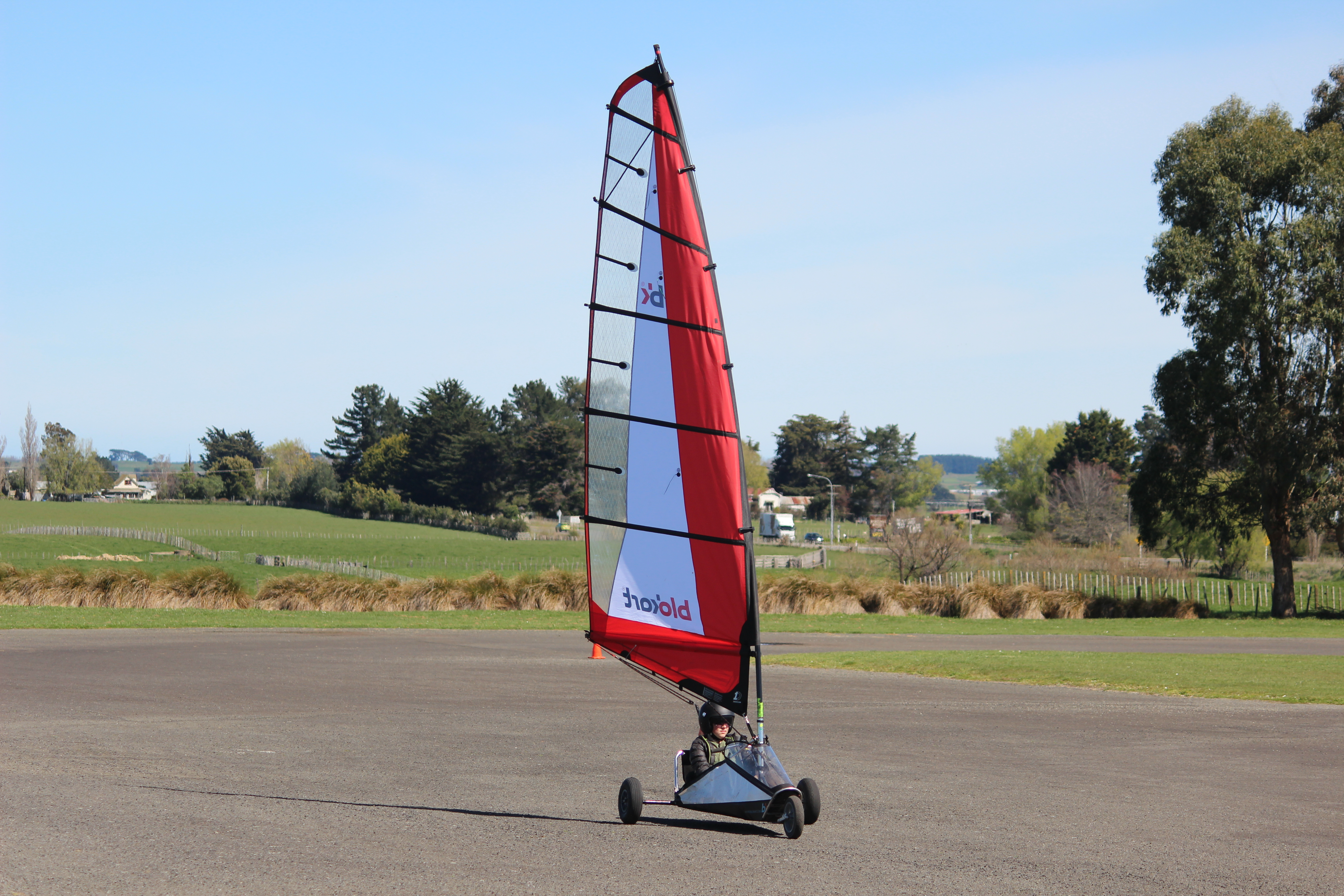
Blokart In motion at Manawatu Blokart Club Sanson.

The Blokart Land Sailor is a popular one-design class of small compact land yacht, manufactured by the New Zealand-based company Blokart International Ltd. (NZ)

They can be quickly disassembled and packed into a carry-bag giving them a high degree of portability and are designed to be particularly easy to learn to sail and safe to use. Leisure sailing is common on beaches, gravel, grass, and other flat surface in many parts of the world – but Blokart racing is also developing as a competitive international sport, with organised racing including national championships in several countries and a biennial world championship. Blokarting programs and academies also train paraplegic and other disabled sailors that have lower body limitations, as Blokarting relies on upper body muscular ability similar to a wheelchair. During downtime of the 2023–24 SailGP championship, international SailGP teams competed in Blokart sailing at Volicity Karts in Christchurch, New Zealand.

== History ==
The Blokart design was developed in 1999 by Paul Beckett, in Tauranga, NZ. Beckett would later say. "It had to be portable, it had to be able to be assembled by a nine-year-old and it had to be usable by a nine-year-old or a grandfather," After finishing the first prototype design Mr Beckett rented out a hangar at Tauranga Airport and build 17 in two months. After that Mr Beckett would launch the Blokart at the New Zealand Boat Show in June 2000. He sold them all and got orders for 750 before the end of the year. Paul Beckett would later give the Blokart company to his son Matt in April 2000. They would later build a dedicated factory in Papamoa, NZ and by 2017, the total number of karts produced exceeded 14,000.

The current Blokart land speed record of 125 km/h (77.7 mph) was set by Scott Young and Dave Lussier at Lake Ivanpah in Eastern California on Wednesday, 11 April 2018. The record was set on the 2nd lap of the final race of the 2018 North Americans when a Haboob (desert wind storm) came across the racing area.

Since 2015, the America's Cup community sailing initiative, Endeavour, has used Blokarts to begin training sailors as young as 8 years old.

== Design ==
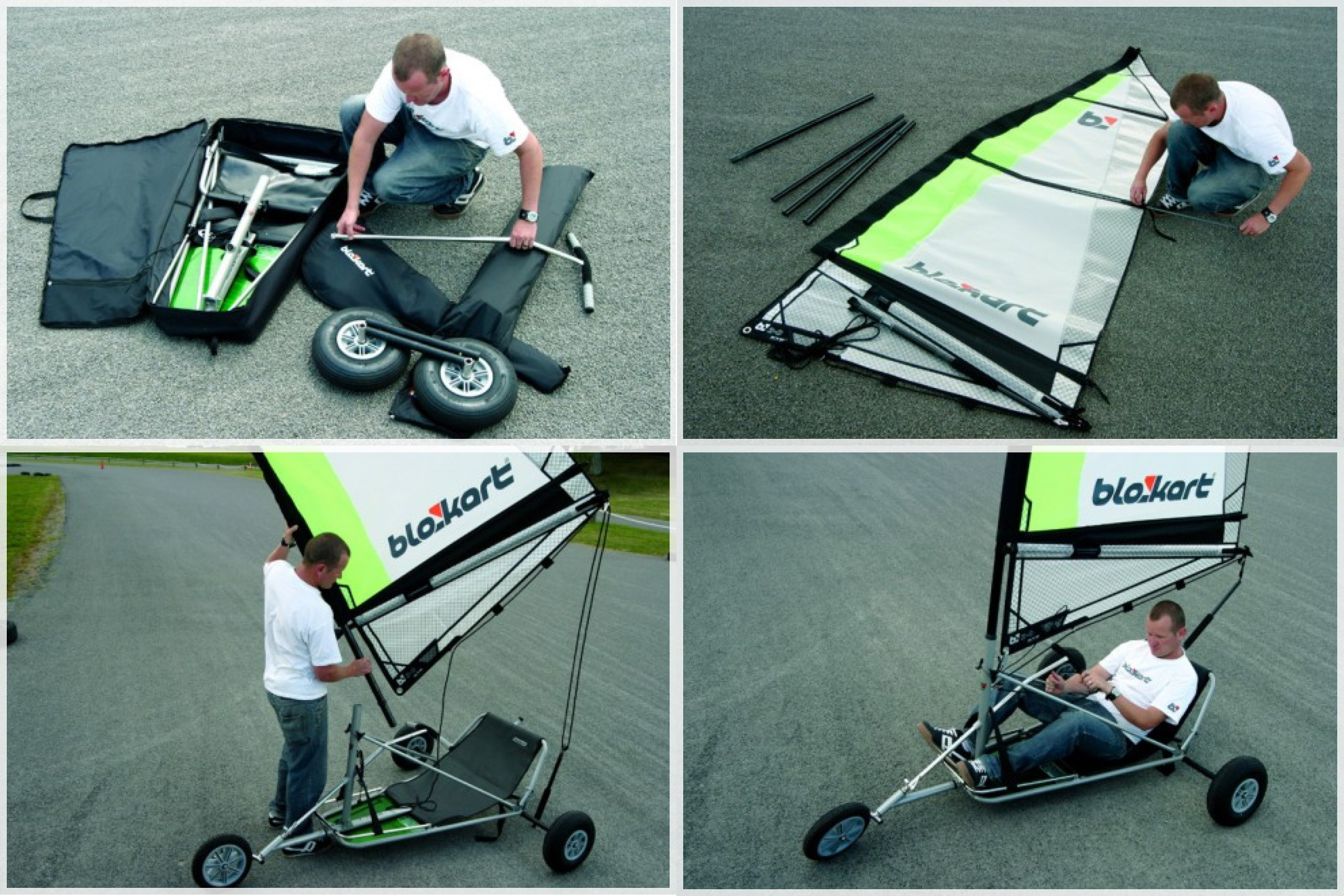
Blokarts can be assembled in minutes without tools

The basic model, including wheels, mast and sail, weighs only 29 kg and can be dismantled in a few minutes without tools, and all parts packed into a carry-case. The high degree of portability allows them to be transported by car, or carried as luggage on a plane. Unlike many other land yachts, the Blokart is steered using the hands via a centrally mounted bar directly coupled to the front wheel. This, along with its compact size, makes it highly maneuverable, and able to be used in small urban areas such as carparks or tennis courts.

Blokarts have four standard sail sizes, 2.0m, 3.0m, 4.0m and 5.5m, with sail size choice being dependent on wind strength and weight of the sailor. Heavier sailors require larger sails, and smaller sails are more efficient in stronger winds. Blokarts can be safely operated in urban settings and by children as young as 8 years old and at speeds similar to a wheelchair. Professionals on closed circuits have reached speeds of more than 100 km/h on land and up to 130 km/h on ice. A side-car accessory or "Shadow" can be added to carry a passenger and a specialized seatbelt enables a tetraplegic passenger to safely ride with an experienced sailor. Blokarts can also be joined head-to-tail together using a "Deuce" bar and multiple can be joined in this way to create long trains.

== Freeride ==
Blokarts can be sailed on any large flat environment. They are best used on beaches subject to tides and wind direction.

In 2007 a group of 11 international adventurers crossed the Gobi Desert on Blokarts in a journey planned by French enthusiast Chrisophe Gombert of France, and Mongol guide and friend Batzorig.

In 2022, 71 year old BB Hredocik sailed a new record of 366.1 miles or 589.18 km within a 24hr period starting in the early morning of May 13 and ending with the morning breeze at around 3AM on May 14 at Loring Air Force Base. During his run, other Blokarts would sail near him and supply water bottles and sandwiches while he sailed.

== Racing ==
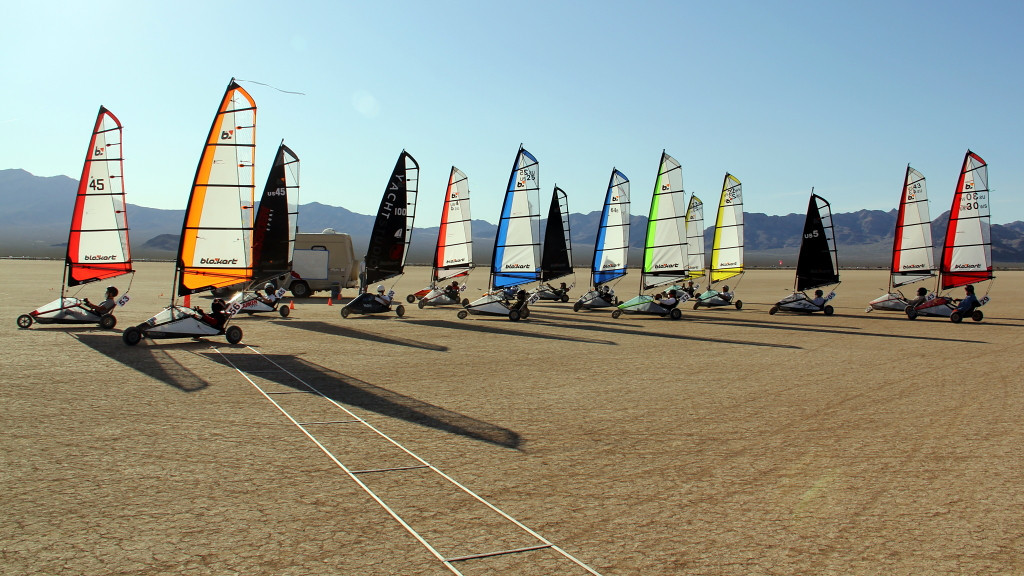
Race Start at Ivanpah Dry Lake Bed, USA

Although Blokarts meet the qualification standard for mini-yachts under the FISLY regulations, they are generally sailed in separate regattas. Racing differs to other land yacht racing – which typically has stationary starts and race across the wind on beaches. It actually has more in common with water-based sailing, with 2-3 minute dial-up starts and windward/leeward courses. Racing is held on purpose-built tracks, airport runways, and parking areas, as well as beaches and dry lake beds. Races are between 5 minutes and 8 minutes in duration.

Blokart Racing is administered by the International Blokart Racing Association (IBRA) who sanction events and set the international racing rules.[1]

Blokart World Championships have been held biennially since 2008 as follows;

Year	Location	Country
2008	Papamoa	New Zealand
2010	Ostend	Belgium
2012	Ivanpah	USA
2014	Perth	Australia
2016	Ivanpah	USA
2018	Majorca	Spain
2022	Manawatu	New Zealand
2024	Ivanpah	USA

Sail selection for racing is dependent on pilot weight and the sailing course. Heavier pilots require larger sails; tighter courses generally require a larger sail – and for straighter and more open courses, a smaller sail provides less drag and therefore greater maximum speed.

=== Classifications ===
Blokarts are raced in two classes; production and performance. The production class is based on the basic design; while in the performance class additional parts from the manufacturer are allowed such as carbon fibre mast sections and an aerodynamic shell, adjustable downhaul and modification of the sail battens to alter the shape of the sail. New components must sanctioned by IBRA before they can be used in racing.

Depending on number of entries at events, Blokart classes are further broken down into weight divisions determined by the body-weight of the racer. For the Blokart world championships the 4 following divisions have been defined:

- Lightweight Division: Less than 70 kg
- Middleweight: From 70 kg to less than 82.5 kg
- Heavyweight: From 82.5 kg to less than 95 kg
- Super Heavyweight: 95 kg and greater

There is usually no differentiation of racers on the basis of gender. There is at some events a youth category.

=== Ice racing ===
Wheels can be replaced with ice blades to allow the Blokart to sail on ice – with the first Blokart Ice World Championships staged in Lithuania in 2010.

== Locations ==
Blokarting can be done on virtually any open area larger than the size of a tennis court. Beaches provide an ideal venue subject to tides, wind direction and density of people. Windy days naturally have fewer people at these locations.

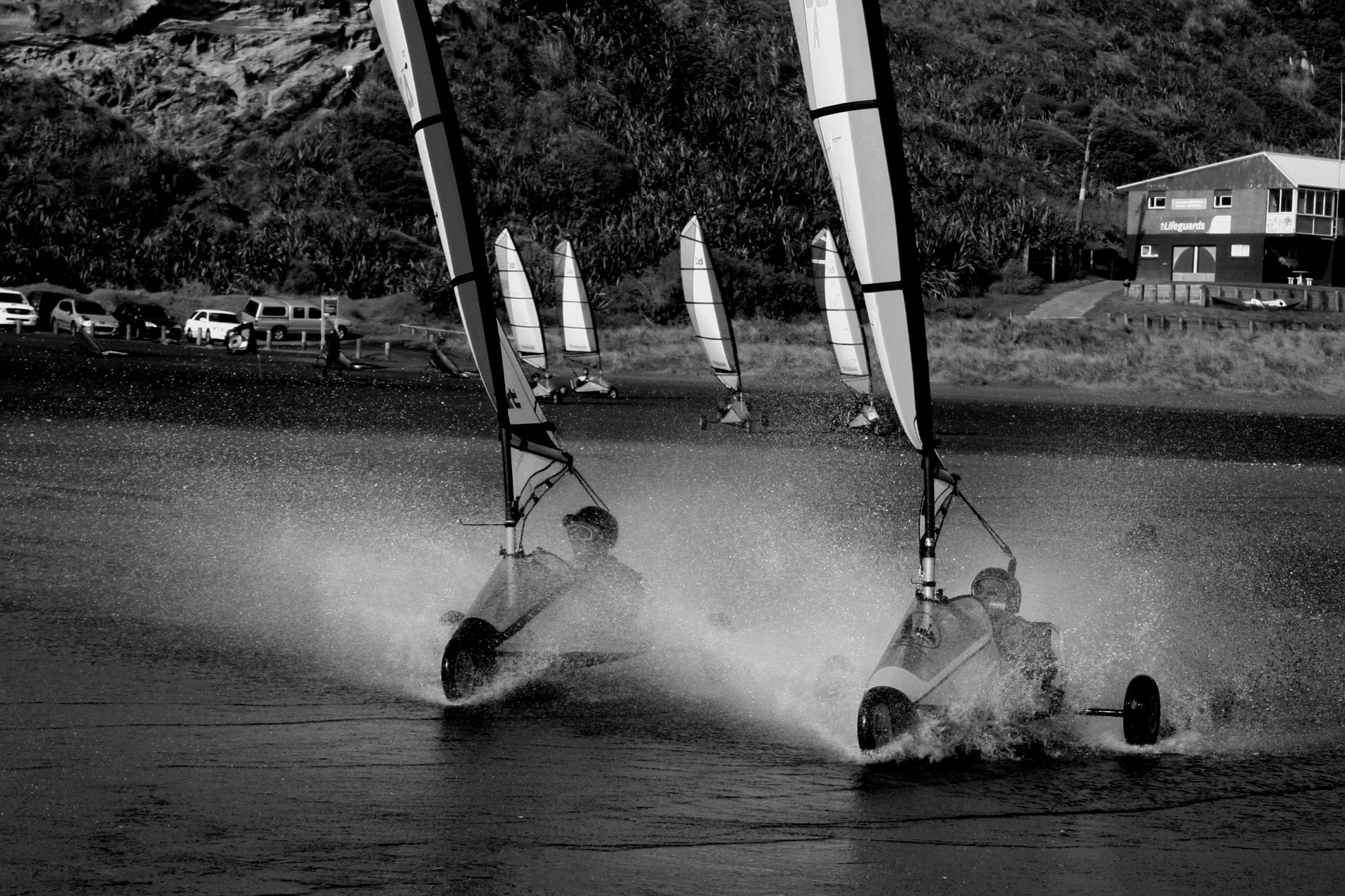
Sailing through the stream at Kariotahi Beach, NZ

On March 26, 2015, following a public process that included public meetings in Ilwaco and Ocean Shores, the Washington State Parks and Recreation Commission approved the use of wind-powered vehicles on portions of Parks-managed ocean beaches.

Some of the most well used areas for Blokart Sailing are listed below.

=== New Zealand ===
- Ninety Mile Beach and Tokerau Beaches, in the far north
- Glinks Gully and Baylys Beach.
- Ruakaka and Forestry Beach
- Muriwai, Karioitahi, Orewa and other beaches in Auckland
- Ardmore Airport – home of the Auckland Blokart Club.
- Sanson Manawatū Blokart Club Track in the Manawatū. On special occasions at the Ohakea Airforce Base
- Waitere & Waikanae Beaches near Wellington
- Higgins Blokart Park, Napier
- Rabbit Island, Tasman
- Pegasus Bay, Canterbury – 19 km of beach sailing from the "Spit" to the Waimakariri River & Pines Beach to the Ashley River
- Velocity Karts – a purpose-built track in Christchurch
- Wigram Airfield – home of the Canterbury Blokart Club
- Oreti Beach near Invercargill

=== Canada ===
- Tidekite ReWIND Adventures – Nova Scotia

=== Australia ===
- Lake Lefroy, Lake Walyungup and Caron Dam Bitumen (Perenjori) in Western Australia
- Lake Gillies and Kingston SE in South Australia
- Mulambin Beach and Farnborough Beach in Yeppoon. Bucasia Beach and Cape Hillsborough at Mackay in Queensland.
- Wangaratta – HQ for the North East Windsport Club @ -36.179696, 146.461640
- Casey Fields Cranbourne, VIC 3977: GPS Coordinates -38.121525, 145.307615 160 Berwick Cranbourne Road Cranbourne East 3977 – home of Victorian Blokart Club
- Olivers Lake and Beaches in Gippsland, Victoria.

=== United States ===
- Ivanpah Lake near Las Vegas
- Red Lake (Kingman, Arizona)
- New Jersey Beaches – Brigantine, Wildwood (off season)
- Musselman Honda Circuit, Arizona

=== Europe ===
- Rømø, Denmark
- IJmuiden beach near Amsterdam, Netherlands
- Ostend and Zeedijk Beaches in Belgium
- La Franqui beach, Berck sur mer (Eole club) France

==== United Kingdom ====
- Cefn Sidan Beach in Wales
- Weston Super Mare in Somerset
- Finmere Aerodrome, just outside Buckingham

== Clubs ==
=== Australia ===
Queensland:

- South East Queensland Blokart Club
- Central Queensland Blokart Club
- Capricornia Blokart Club

Victoria:

- Victorian Blokart Club
- Melbourne Blokart Club
- Wangaratta, Victoria – North East Windsport Club

Western Australia:

- Perth Blokart Club

South Australia:

- South Australian Blokart Club

=== New Zealand ===
- Auckland Blokart Club
- Bay Blokart Club
- Hawkes Bay Blokart Club
- Canterbury Blokart Club
- Manawatū Blokart Club

=== Spain ===
- Asociación Española de Carrovelismo – Spanish Landsailing Association

=== United Kingdom ===
- The British Land Speedsail Association (BLSA)

=== United States ===
- North American Blokart Sailing Association

== See also ==
- Ice yachting
- Kite buggying
- Kite landboarding
- Land windsurfing
- Whike sailing cycle
- Wind-powered land vehicle
