= Noel Hilliam =

New Zealand dairy farmer and shipwreck hunter

- Photographed in 2010
- Born: 1936 or 1937
- Died: 10 September 2017 (aged 80); Dargaville, New Zealand
- Occupation: Dairy farmer

Noel Edward Hilliam (1936 or 1937 – 10 September 2017) was a New Zealand dairy farmer, shipwreck hunter, and amateur historian.

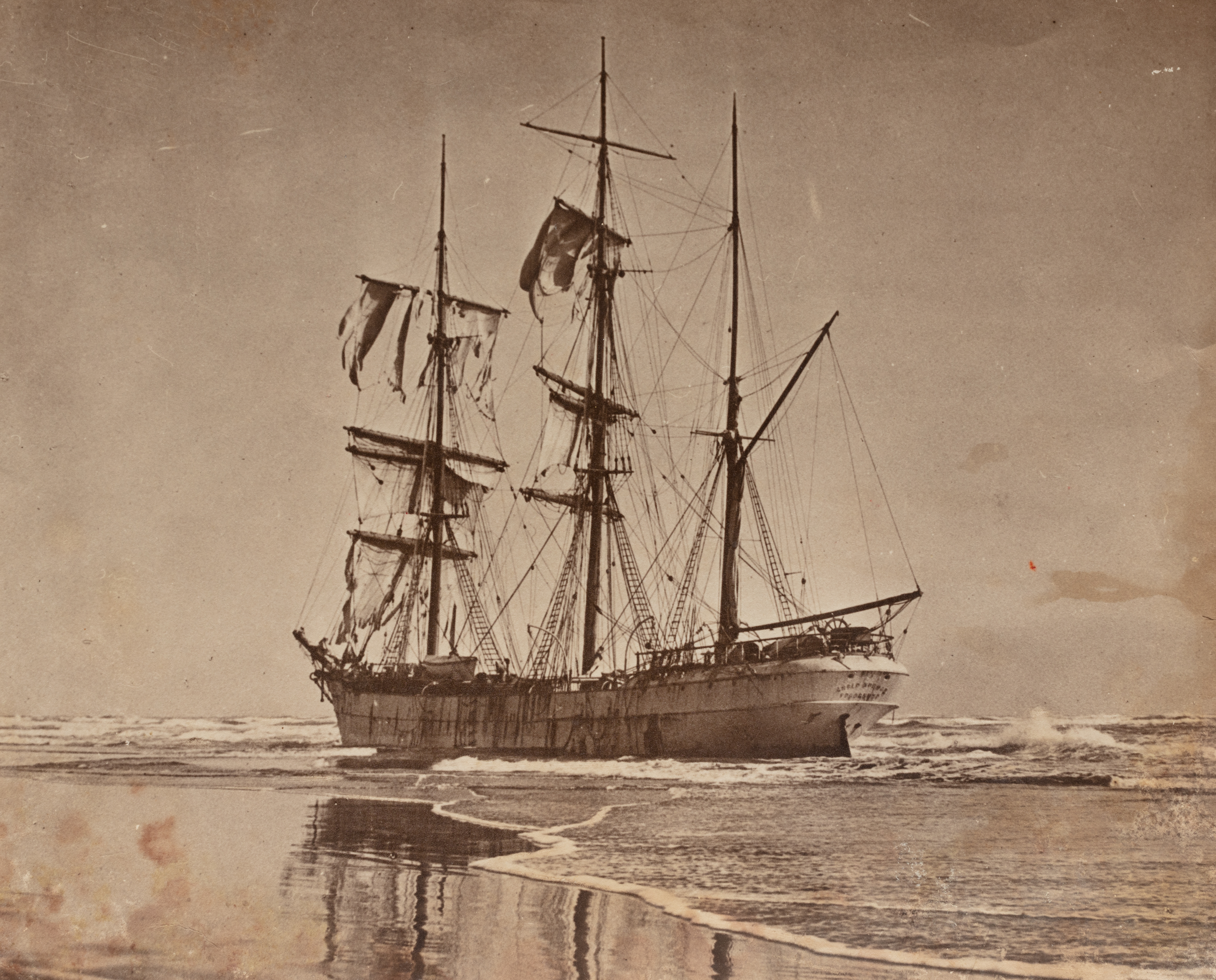
Three-masted barque Anglo-Norman aground on Kaipara Bar, New Zealand, one of the many shipwrecks Hilliam researched

Hilliam researched and documented a large number of shipwrecks in the Northland Region, including the numerous wrecks at the Kaipara Harbour. Hilliam claimed to have material he had salvaged from wrecks, including a "rubber pintle" alleged to date from 1590, planks of wood from 1560 and more. There are 110 recorded shipwrecks on the Kaipara and Ripiro Beach coast, but Hilliam claimed to know of 153 (17 of which are unidentified).

== Notable dates and claims ==
=== Ancient Spanish and Dutch ships ===
In 1982, Hilliam reported seeing the wreck of a Spanish ship while flying over Baylys Beach, but the "swirling sands quickly covered the find over again".

In the same year Hilliam identified a wooden ship exposed in the shallow waters of Midge Bay, north of the Kaipara Harbour entrance. After researching this, Hilliam suggests that the wreck could be from between the voyages of Tasman & Cook – pointing towards further Dutch exploration of the South Pacific. This wreck is suggested to be New Zealand's oldest shipwreck.

=== Pre-Māori village ===
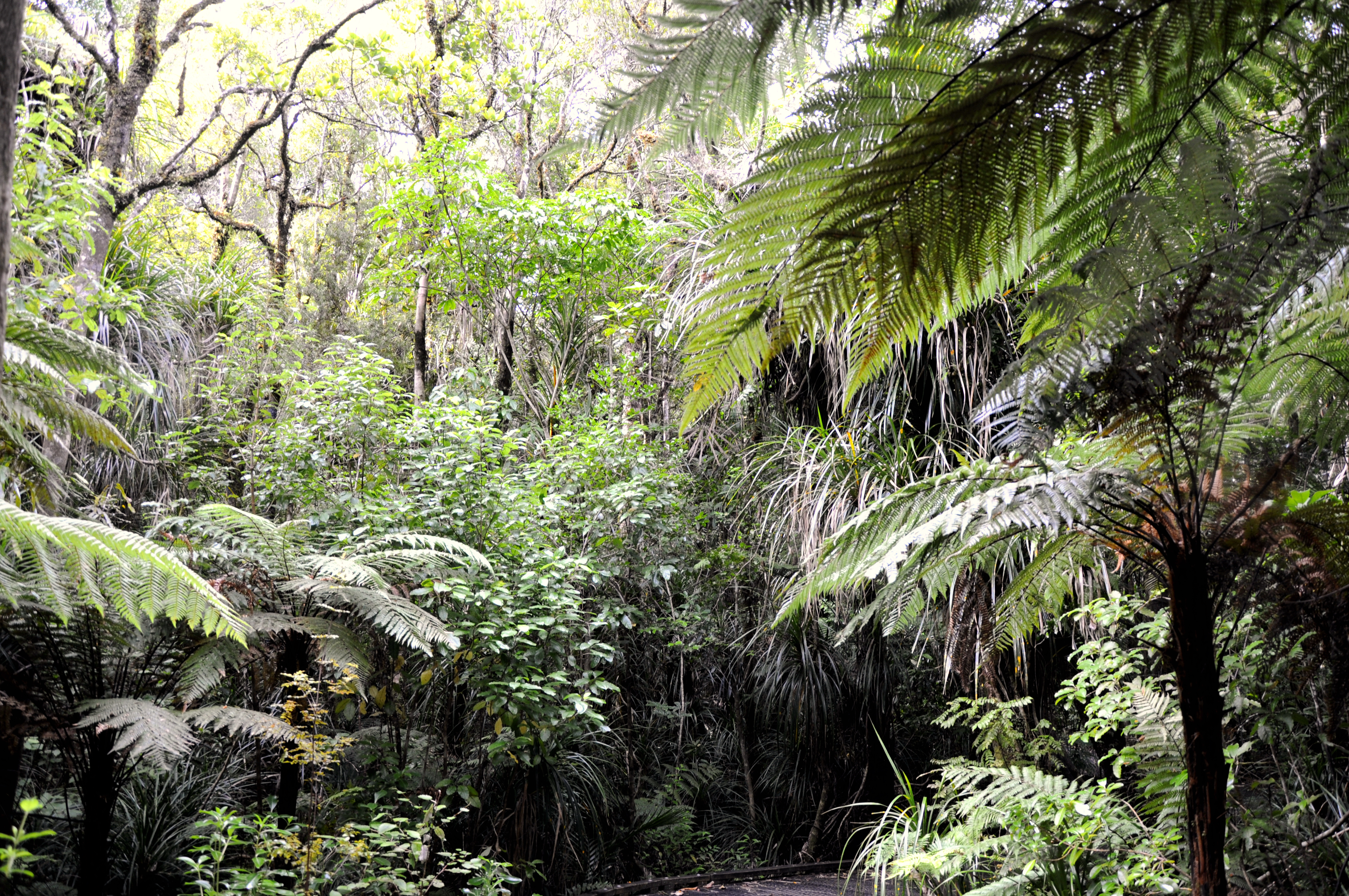
An image showing how thick and dense the foliage is inside the Waipoua Forest

In 1998, elders of Te Uri o Hau restricted access to sacred Māori sites in Kaipara after Hilliam arrived without being given permission and said that he found a prehistoric village, allegedly occupied by a people displaced by Māori around 600 years ago. Although he did not disclose the location, it is locally suggested to be the man-made, stone structures in the Waipoua Forest. Hilliam has since argued that these structures were evidence of pre-Māori settlement.

In 1988, New Zealand archaeologist Michael Taylor submitted 14 pages of notes about the structures to the National Archives with the condition that access to the records be restricted for 75 years. This led to a popular conspiracy theory that Taylor was covering up something about the site. In reality, the request was made out of respect to the privacy of the local iwi due to the inclusion of "personal and family information" pertaining to their cultural group. The embargo was lifted early in 1996, two years before Hilliam's visit.

=== Historic shipwreck uncovered ===
In 2004, after pursuing it for 30 years, Hilliam participated in excavating a shipwreck west of Dargaville. This shipwreck had previously surfaced in both 1973 and 1909. Items recovered including an anchor chain and a 1.5-metre (4 ft 11 in) cannon known as a carronade.

=== Claim of U-boat discovery ===
In 2008, The Underwater Heritage Group (of which Hilliam was vice-president) announced that they had discovered a German U-boat off the Kaipara Coast. Hilliam claimed the submarine had been "observed seven times" and three divers had been to it – however, no one else has verified the find and Hilliam refused to share the location.

=== Spanish caravel – San Lesmes ===
In 2009, it was suggested that Spanish sailors might have reached New Zealand over a century before Abel Tasman. An unnamed, "Oxford-educated" researcher examined these claims, based on Hilliam's belief that a Spanish ship visited in the 16th century and sank near Aranga on Northland's west coast. It was suggested by Winston Cowie (a contemporary of Hilliam) that this ship was the caravel San Lesmes. Hilliam claimed that 22 of the 53 crew members were from Aranga, Spain—a name also found in a Northland area where the wreck was seen (e.g. the Northland town of Aranga). He also claimed that the main street in that Spanish town was 'Rua Tui', which resembles a Māori name. There are at least four streets in Spain called Rúa Tui and while the name does sound like Māori, Rúa is a Spanish word meaning street. The town of Aranga does not have a street called Rúa Tui, although the nearby towns of Lugo and A Coruña (each about 40 mins away) both do. It is of note that there are multiple theories as to where the caravel San Lesmes ended up, or if it simply sunk somewhere in the Pacific. Robert Langdon's book The Lost Caravel suggests it sunk at the Tuamotu Archipelago due to speculation about Polynesians with European features and the use of Spanish words there.

The remains of the ship vanished before he could show it to anyone. It has not been seen since.

=== Co-authored To the Ends of the Earth ===
In 2012, Hilliam co-authored To the Ends of the Earth, which controversially argued that the Māori demigod Maui was not Polynesian but an ancient Egyptian navigator. It also claims that New Zealand was discovered by ancient Egyptians and Greeks.

=== Claims of P-51 in Northern Wairoa ===
In 2016, Hilliam claimed to find remains of a P-51 Mustang in the Wairoa River. Although attempts were made, they were not able to successfully find and raise the plane before Hilliam's death. No evidence exists to show the P-51 Mustang exists in the Wairoa River.

=== Welsh skulls ===
In 2017 Hilliam claimed he found human remains of Welsh origin that pre-dated Māori. The "Welsh" skulls were examined by a "forensic expert" from Edinburgh University. Hilliam then said the person had since died. A spokesperson for the University of Edinburgh said none of their academics contributed to the project. Hilliam said he presented a forensic pathologist ("one of the top 10 in the world") with teeth for DNA testing. However, he would "not name them or the institutions where they work". Hilliam used an unnamed "expert in computer-imaged facial reconstruction" to create images purporting to show what the pre-Māori settlers looked like. These were published by a Northern Advocate journalist. The article was soon removed, and an apology issued by the newspaper.

== Roles ==
- First president of the New Zealand Underwater Heritage Group (NZUHG)
- Committee member of the Northland Historic Places Trust
- Curator of the Dargaville Maritime Museum

== Awards ==
2017 – The Kelly Tarlton Award for Services to Underwater Heritage
