= Hilliam =

Hilliam is a surname. Notable people with the surname include:

- Bentley Collingwood Hilliam (1890–1968), British singer-songwriter and musician
- Noel Hilliam shipwreck hunter and amateur historian from Northland Region, New Zealand
- Rachel Hilliam, British statistician
- Sue Hilliam (born 1941), English cricketer

== See also ==
- William
