= Land sailing =

Wind-powered ground transportation

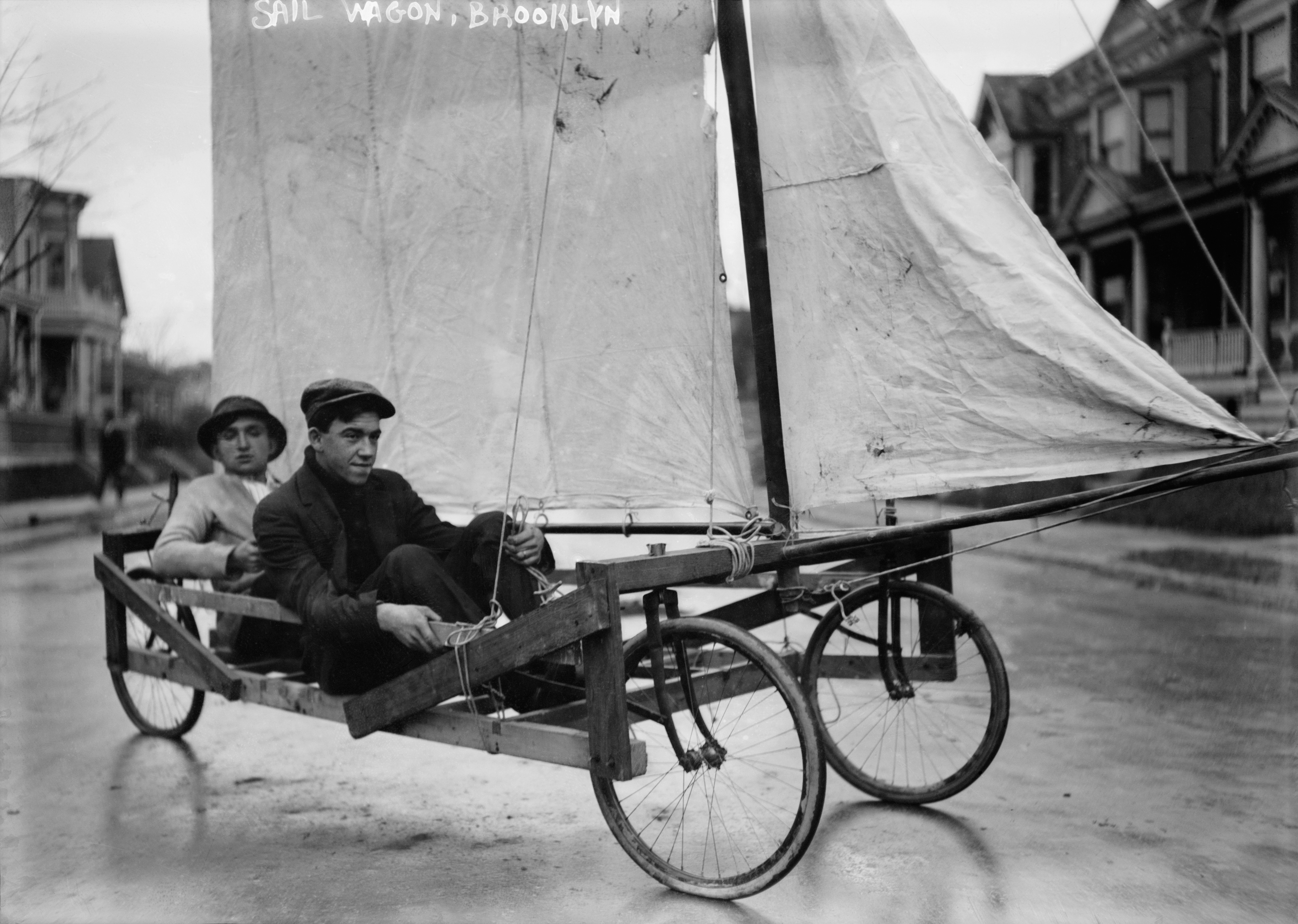
An early 20th-century sail wagon in Brooklyn, New York

Land sailing, also known as sand yachting, land yachting or dirtboating, entails overland travel with a sail-powered vehicle, similar to sailing on water. Originally, a form of transportation or recreation, it has evolved primarily into a racing sport since the 1950s.

Vehicles used in sailing are known as sail wagons, sand yachts, or land yachts. They typically have three (sometimes four) wheels and function much like a sailboat, except that they are operated from a sitting or lying position and steered by pedals or hand levers. Land sailing works best in windy flat areas, and races often happen on beaches, airfields, and dry lake beds in desert regions. Modern land sailors, generally known as "pilots", can go three to four times faster than the wind speed. A gust of wind is considered more beneficial in a land sailing race than a favorable windshift. A similar sport, known as ice yachting, is practiced on frozen lakes and rivers. Another variation is the Whike, which combines land sailing with bicycling and can therefore also be used in everyday traffic because it does not fully depend on wind.

== History ==
=== Sailing carriage ===
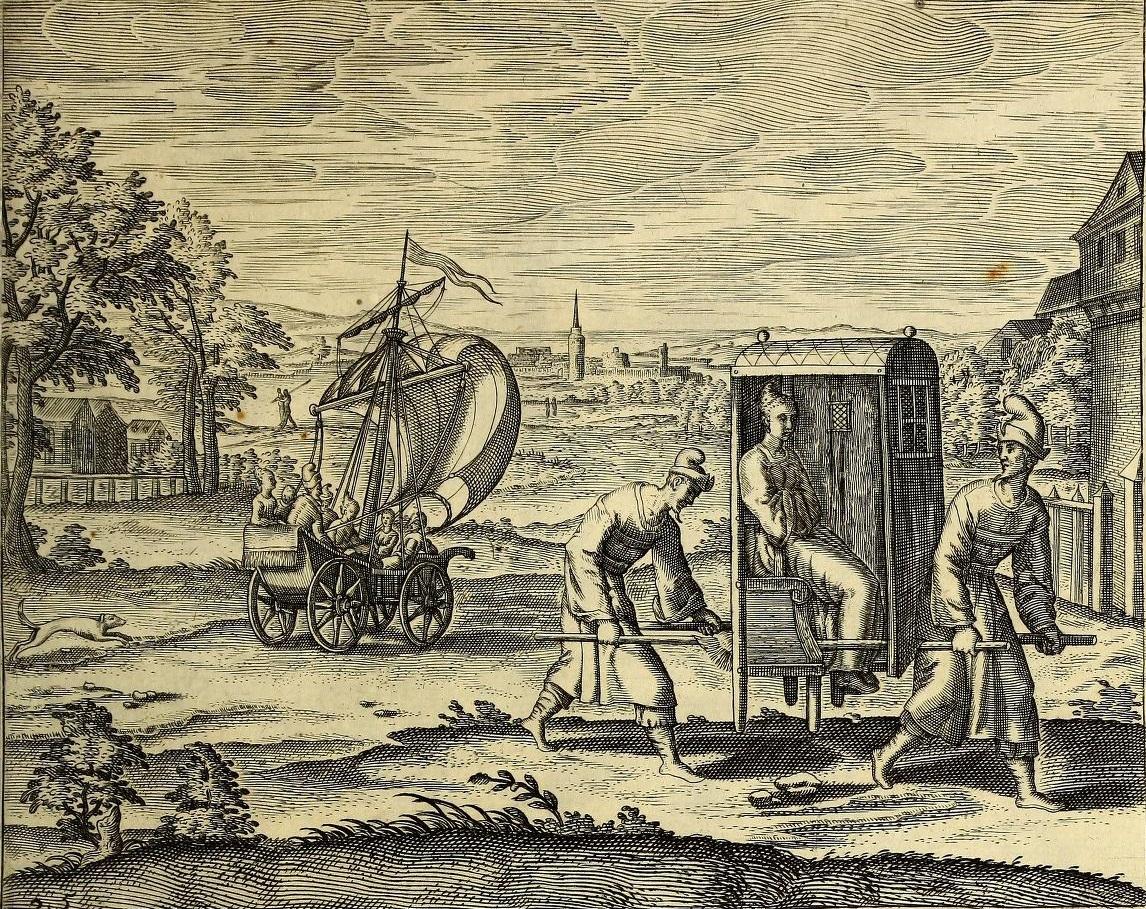
Carriage with sail in China, 1599.

The earliest text describing the Chinese use of mounting masts and sails on large vehicles is the Book of the Golden Hall Master written by the Daoist scholar and crown prince Xiao Yi, who later became Emperor Yuan of Liang (r. 552–554 AD). He wrote that Gaocang Wushu invented a "wind-driven carriage" which was able to carry thirty people at once. There was another built in about 610 for the Emperor Yang of Sui (r. 604–617), as described in the Continuation of the New Discourses on the Talk of the Times.

European travelers from the 16th century onwards mentioned sailing carriages with surprise. In 1585, during the Chinese Ming Dynasty, Gonzales de Mendoza wrote that the Chinese had many coaches and wagons mounted with sails, and even depicted them in artwork of silk hanfu robes and on earthenware vessels. In the 1584 atlas Theatrum Orbis Terrarum written by the cartographer Abraham Ortelius (1527–1598), there are large Chinese carriages depicted with sails and masts. Likewise, there are the same Chinese vehicles with sails depicted in the Atlas of Gerardus Mercator (1512–1594), as well as the 1626 book Kingdome of China by John Speed. The English poet John Milton (1608–1674) exemplified western interest in the Chinese sailing carriage when he mentioned it in a metaphor in his epic Paradise Lost, published in 1667.

In the 19th century, "windwagons" were occasionally used for transport across the American great plains. Rail-running sail cars were also used in South America. One such sailcar existed on the Dona Teresa Cristina Railroad in Santa Catarina, Brazil in the 1870s.

=== Early yachts ===
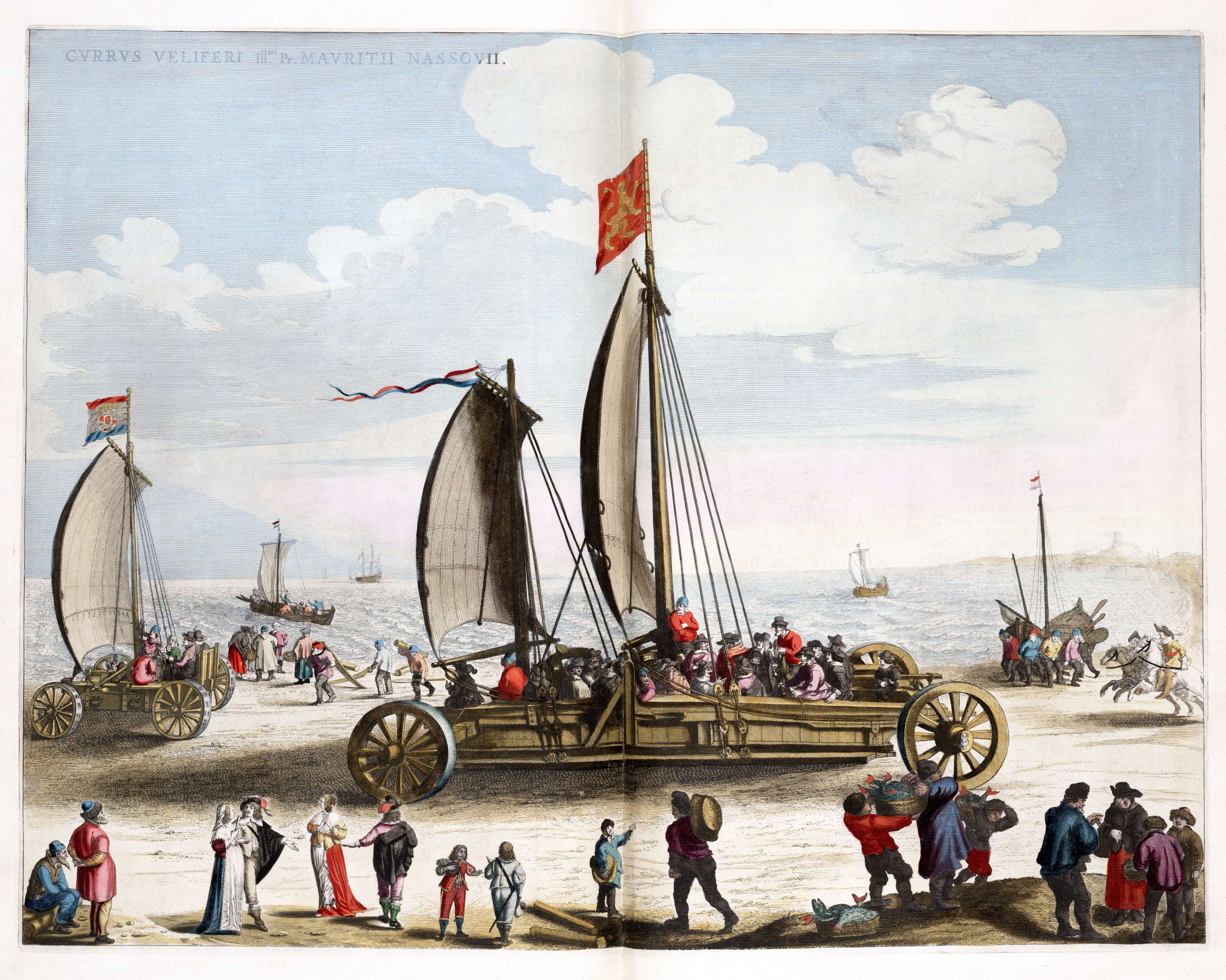
Land yachts designed by Simon Stevin in 1600

The precursor to the modern land yacht was invented in the summer of the year 1600 by the Flemish scientist Simon Stevin in Flanders as a commission for Prince Maurice of Orange. It was used by Prince Maurice for entertaining his guests. In 1898, the Dumont brothers of De Panne, Belgium, developed a land yacht whose sails were based on contemporary Egyptian sailboats used on the Nile River. Louis Bleriot, the French aviation pioneer was instrumental in developing landsailing as a sport. It was viewed as an alternative sport when strong winds would have made flying in early aircraft too dangerous. Bleriot's landsailers were first tried on the Buc airstrip (SW of Paris). Bleriot machines gave their best on Channel and North Sea wide and windy beaches at low tide (Calais, Hardelot, La Panne, Quend, Audresselles etc.). The Blériot firm coined the name "aéroplage" (plage is the French for beach) and even registered it as a trademark. The first races were held on the beaches of Belgium and France in 1909. Land yachts were also used in the late 19th century and early 20th century to transport goods on dry lakes in America.

=== Modern yachts ===
The modern land yacht, a three-wheeled polyester/fibreglass and metal cart, often with a wing-mast and relatively rigid (full-batten) sails, has been used since 1960.

In 1967, a French Foreign Legion officer organized a land yacht race across the Sahara Desert. Teams from 7 countries assembled at Colomb-Béchar in Algeria and using French-designed and built machines for the most part, sailed 1,700 miles (2,700 km) through Algeria, Spanish Morocco and into the capital of Mauritania. Due to the harsh conditions, the idea of racing was abandoned, though at the time three young American boatbuilders, Larry Pardey, Richard Arthur and Warren Zeibarth (Captain, Pardey), were leading the race, with scores double those of any other team. The story made the cover of National Geographic in November 1967. A reenactment of this event took place three years later and was filmed by National Geographic.

=== Landsailing on Venus ===
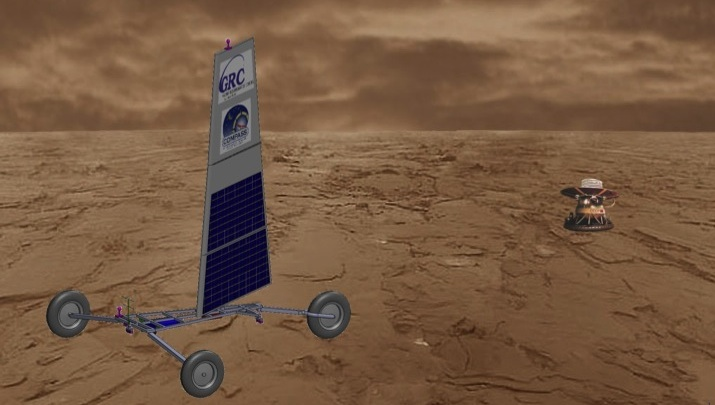
The "Zephyr" landsailing rover, a concept for a wind-propelled rover on the surface of Venus. Image from NASA John Glenn Research Center, for the NASA Innovative Advanced Concepts ("NIAC") project.

In 2013, NASA scientist Geoffrey A. Landis proposed that a sail could be used for propulsion of a rover on Venus or other planets. According to Popular Mechanics, it is "an ambitious proposal […] to develop a rover that works with Venus's topography and winds.

In 2017, Landis's work was the subject of the book Land-Sailing Venus Rover With NASA Inventor Geoffrey Landis, published by World Book publishing.

== Speed record ==
The world land speed record for a wind-powered vehicle was broken on 11 December 2022 by Emirates Team New Zealand with Australian Pilot Glenn Ashby with a speed of 222.43 km/h (138.21 mph).

It was previously held by Briton Richard Jenkins in his yacht Greenbird with a speed of 126.1 mph (202.9 km/h). Wind speeds were fluctuating between 30–50 mph (48–80 km/h) at that time.

The previous record of 116 mph (187 km/h) was set by American Bob Schumacher on March 20, 1999 piloting Iron Duck vehicle designed and engineered by American Bob Dill in Burlington, Vermont. Both records were set on Ivanpah Dry Lake near Primm, Nevada, United States.

A previous attempt at the record by Britons Dale Vince and Richard Jenkins at Lake Lefroy in Western Australia in their carbon-neutral vehicle, Greenbird, failed on 12 September 2008.

== Classes ==
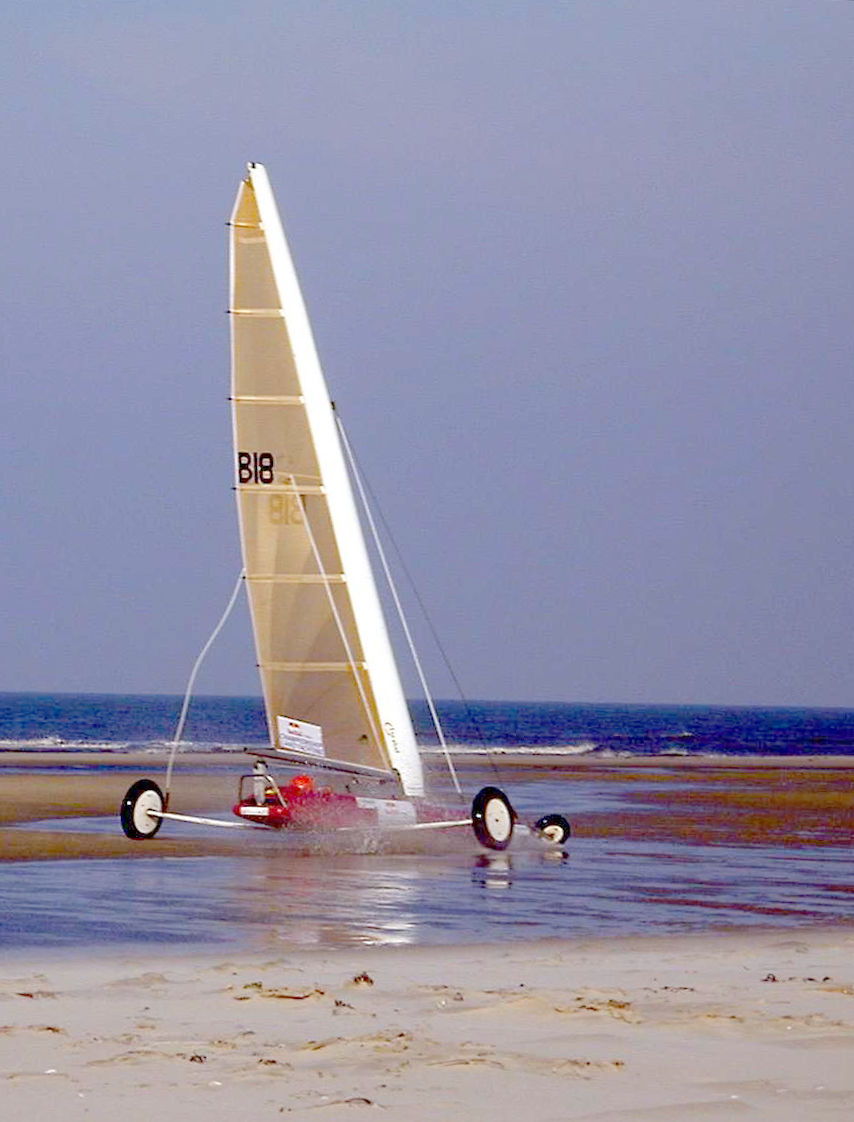
A Belgian Class 3 competition land yacht

The international governing body for the sport of land and sandyachting was formed in 1962. The Federation International de Sand et Land Yachting (FISLY) has member countries from around the world and has divided the sporting side of the activity into various classes. There are a number of basic types, or "classes", of land yachts. Because of the very different nature of each class, they compete separately in races. The largest class of yachts are known as Class 2, which may have masts as large as 8 metres (26 ft). The massive sail area provides significant power, although the speed of Class 2 yachts can sometimes be limited by their large size. These are sailed mainly in continental Europe and not sailed at all in some countries such as the United Kingdom.

The Class 3 is probably the most popular of the large yacht designs, almost identical to the Class 2 in appearance, but significantly smaller. Class 3 yachts are generally made from fiberglass, sometimes in combination with other high-tech lightweight materials, such as carbon fibre, Kevlar, or various composites, with a wooden rear axle. They are capable of reaching speeds up to 70 miles per hour (113 km/h).

The Class 5 is much smaller than the 2 and 3, and has a very different shape. The pilot still sails the yacht lying down, but unlike the 2 and 3, he lies in a seat that is suspended from or cantilevered off the chassis, rather than inside the body. The chassis is usually made of steel and aluminium, with a fibreglass or carbon–Kevlar seat. Class 5 yachts are capable of reaching speeds up to 60 miles per hour (97 km/h), and some have been faster, closer to 70 miles per hour (113 km/h).

While Class 2, 3, and 5 yachts must meet certain strict guidelines, the specifications are flexible to an extent That allows individualism and development.

The "Standart" Class is unique in that it is the only recognised international monotype sand yacht with all yachts being identical. Similar to Class 5 in shape and function, they must follow a special design supplied by the French manufacturer Seagull. This class is widely popular because it means the outcome of a competition rests entirely with the pilot, as the yacht itself cannot provide an advantage or disadvantage.

Class 7 yachts are built like skateboards with a sail, much like a land-borne windsurfing board. These are also called Speed Sail (A registered trademark by Norbert Blanc, a French inventor who made successful adaptation of a windsurfer sail on an enlarged skateboard, with special wheels and improved axles, in the wake of the 1980' windsurfing craze) and are fully recognised by FISLY as part of sand yacht clubs, they are also sailed for fun and hobby.

Class 8 land yachts: kite buggying or parakarting, differ from other classes in that the sail is replaced with a large traction kite, usually flown on 20–40 m quad lines. The buggies are also considerably smaller and more maneuverable. This relatively new class of the sport is still undergoing rapid development but has become popular in recent years due to its portability, relative low cost and flexibility. Kite buggying also uniquely offers the pilot the possibility of getting real air time as buggies are sometimes launched into the air by the traction kite. Class 8 activities are generally grouped under:

- racing, using large kites and very large and heavy buggies: the current speed record is 135.34 km/h (84.10 mph) by Brian Holgate on the 6th March 2012 at dry Ivanpah Lake, Nevada.
- freestyle where smaller, lighter machines perform freestyle tricks such as airs, spins, wheelies, reverse flying, etc.
- endurance or cruising: the 24-hour distance record is 623 km by New Zealander Peter Foulkes, where long distances are covered in trips lasting several days : Transat des Sables and Gobi Kite Buggy Challenge, or the Mad way south Sahara challenge, a 2200 km attempt to cross the desert.

"Miniyachts" are small land yachts which are aimed at the leisure market, however, any type of land yacht can be raced and the identical nature of these yachts make them ideal fun racers due to their similar size and sail area. This style of yacht uses a traditional style land yacht rig with a smaller chassis and body where the pilot is able to sit in a conventional way and control the sail with a simple main sheet. These are the smallest, cheapest and lightest yachts available and are tremendously safe and easy to sail with basic instruction. Miniyachts' popularity is increasing rapidly and they are now being built by enthusiasts around the world.

The basic definition of a miniyacht is "Any assembled land or sand yacht that fits inside a continuous loop of rope 5.6 m long is a miniyacht". Some designs of mini yachts can be dismantled and carried in the trunk of a car. They can be sailed equally well by small children and large adults and have the added advantage of going on grass as well as sand or concrete. These yachts are popular in Europe, America, Australia, New Zealand, UK and Ireland.

There are also a range of small miniyachts able to be packed into a case and carried in a car or as luggage on a plane. The New Zealand Blokart, UK X-sails, Potty, windbob and Spanish designs like Rinox and WinDreamer together with French and German miniyachts like those from the manufacturers Libre, Airtrack, Plume and Seagull all fall into this category and are small, fast and manoeuvrable and therefore able to be sailed in small urban areas. The hand steering versions allow disabled people to use them and compete with able-bodied competitors.

== Competition ==
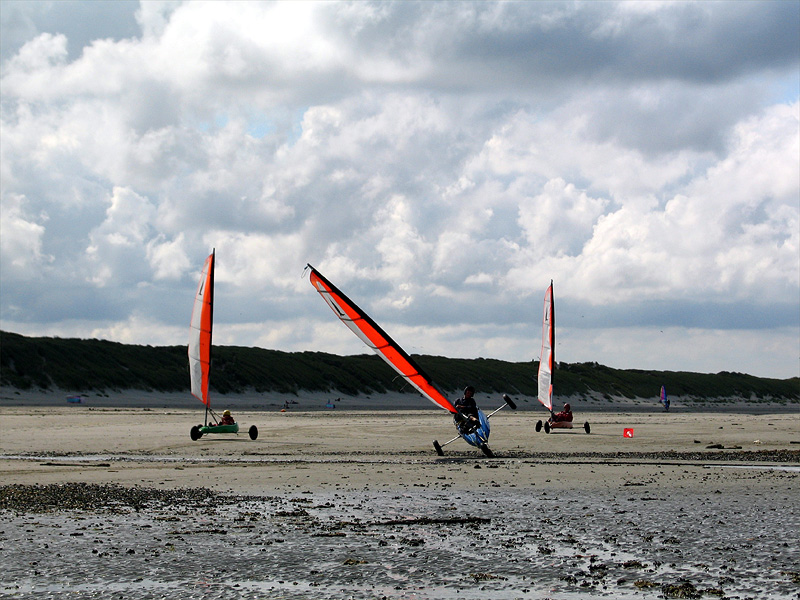
In recent decades, land sailing has evolved into a sport, shown here on the beaches of Quend, Bay of Somme, France.

- Land yacht competitors are spread over all continents: from the vast beaches of Western Europe, Ireland and the UK, New Zealand and Brazil, dry-lake surfaces in the US, Argentina, Australia and Africa to frozen lakes in Canada and Scandinavia (using skates instead of wheels).
- National landyacht associations are united in the international landyacht federation called FISLY. This organisation sets up the racing rules. Every few years, world championships are organised. There are also many local races and competitions every week and annual European and Pacific Rim championships.
- Racing yachts are divided in four classes by FISLY: Class 5 and Class Standart have a tubular steel or aluminium frame and mast with a glassfiber seats. The bigger Class 3 and Class 2 yachts have a lightweight glassfiber hull and wing-shaped mast and (mostly) a wooden rear axle.

=== European and world championships ===
One of the largest international events in the sport are the European championships, in which competitors of all classes from all over Europe travel to a sand yachting venue for a week-long competition. The Wirral Sand Yacht Club, on Hoylake beach, hosted the event in September 2007. Rada Tilly hosted the World Championship XI in February 2008, an event that was first developed in Argentina and in South America.

St Peter Ording was the venue for the 2009 European Championships. De Panne in Belgium hosted the 2010 World Championships. The 2011 European Championships were held in Hoylake on the Wirral peninsula near Liverpool. Attendees included local politicians Esther McVey and Stephen Hesford, alongside the Mayor of Wirral, the Head of the International Governing body for Sandyachting, and some of the 150 competitors from Argentina, France, Germany, Belgium, Switzerland, Sweden Italy, Ireland, Chile, Denmark, US, Australia and the UK. 2012 saw the World Championships being held in Cherreuix, Brittany, France, near the world heritage site Mont Saint Michel. The event catered for all FISLY classes, and 350 competitors participated over the eight days. 2013 Europeans were held in St Peter Ording Germany.

In July 2014, the FISLY Landyachting World Championships were organised by the North American Land Sailing Associations (NALSA) and its President Dennis Bassano on the remote dry lake of Smith Creek in Central Nevada. Over 400 people from 16 countries spent a week based on the remote lake bed at 6300 ft, where many of the "legends" of the sport including the current world speed record holder Richard Jenkins had gathered. Double Olympic gold medal sailor Shirley Robertson participated in the championship, accompanied by a film crew from the CNN Mainsail programme who produced a TV record of the event.

=== North America ===
In the US, annual competitions are held by local clubs and by NALSA, the North American Landsailing Association. The largest regatta is regularly held the last week of March on the playa at the California-Nevada border near Primm, Nevada. The classes sailed in the US include several one-design classes, international class 5 (5 m² class in the US), and open classes solely based on the sail/wing area. The European yachts sail with the appropriate US open class according to their sail area.

Promoting international competition, there are periodic regattas including FISLY and other landsailing nations, mostly on the Pacific Rim. The host and venue of this regatta rotates, and the 2009 event was to be hosted by NALSA at the March regatta.

A history of sailing in the US can be found at Nalsa.org.

Blokart sailing is coordinated by the North American Blokart Sailing Association.

=== Blokart racing ===
Blokart racing is a sport administered by the International Blokart Racing Association (IBRA), who sanction events and set the international racing rules.

Blokart World Championships have been held biennially since the inaugural event at the home of Blokart in Papamoa, New Zealand in 2008. The Blokart Worlds event has been since held in Ostend, Belgium; Ivanpah, California, US; and Perth, Australia. In 2018 the Worlds event was held in Binissalem, Mallorca, Spain.

Blokart racing is held on purpose built tracks, airport runways, parking areas as well as beaches and dry lake beds. Blokart race events are held around the world, with major events such as New Zealand Open, European Open, British Open, Australian Open, and the North American Open held annually.

Blokarts are raced in two classes – production and performance, and in various weight divisions. The production class is based on the basic blokart design. In the performance class additional parts from the manufacturer are allowed such as carbon fibre mast sections and an aerodynamic shell, adjustable downhaul and modification of the sail battens to alter the shape of the sail. Blokarts have four standard sail sizes, 2.0m, 3.0m, 4.0m and 5.5m, with sail size choice being dependent on wind strength and weight of the sailor, with heavier sailors requiring larger sails, and smaller sails being more efficient in stronger winds.

== In popular culture ==
- Part of the journey in Around the World in Eighty Days of Jules Verne is done by sailsleigh.
- In the 1909 Land of Oz book The Road to Oz, Dorothy Gale, Shaggy Man, and Button-Bright cross the Deadly Desert into Oz by use of a sand ship.
- Land sailing is featured in Clive Cussler's Dirk Pitt novel, Sahara, and also in its film adaptation. Cussler later had his character, Juan Cabrillo, jury-rig a para-skiing apparatus for land-sailing in his Oregon Files novel, Skeleton Coast.
- Blokarting featured in The Amazing Race 13, in episode 4.
- Sand sailing is featured as a means of desert transportation in Avatar: The Last Airbender, in episodes 30 and 31.
- A landsailing rover on the planet Venus was selected by the NASA Institute for Advanced Concepts program as a technology study
- Land sailing is featured in book three, Odalisque, of Neal Stephenson's novel Quicksilver, the first part of Stephenson's Baroque Cycle.
- In The Dreamstone, The Urpneys used a land yacht twice, in 'Trouble with the Miners' and 'The Jolly Bird.'
- The British reality-television competition series Scrapheap Challenge featured land yachts in season 2, episode 4. One team created a dual-sail yacht, but failed to win.
- The American reality-television competition series Junkyard Wars featured land yachts in season 7, episode 3 "Sand Yacht". Two teams, each led by an expert land yachtsman, constructed small yachts from parts available in a junkyard. The team that won used an aluminium sail, supposedly the first time a metal sail was used for a land yacht.
- The American tall tale "Windwagon Smith" is about a sea captain who traveled across Kansas in a wind-propelled covered wagon fitted with a sail. This tale was adapted into the Disney animated short The Saga of Windwagon Smith.
- The novel Hyperion by Dan Simmons features a so-called 'wind-wagon' which carries the protagonists across the sea of grass, a large plain filled with razor sharp head-height grass.
- The novel The Green Odyssey by Philip José Farmer is placed on an Earth-like planet covered by a sea of grass. The plot involves wheeled sailing ships and dangerously mobile islands.
- In Robert Sheckley's short story "A Wind is Rising" (1957), the natives of the extremely windy planet Carella use land ships as a common travel method.
- In the episodes 8 and 9 Secret of Cerulean Sand, Jane Buxton, her guide Sabri and her butler Chambellan travel across the Oriental desert in a land yacht
- In Pete's Dragon the villainous quack doctor Terminus arrives in Passamaquoddy driving a sail-powered wagon because his horses were stolen by the inhabitants of the previous town he visited.

== See also ==
- Ice yachting
- Kite buggying
- Kiteboarding
- Land windsurfing
- Whike sailing cycle
- Wind-powered land vehicle
