= Manjeet Singh Riyat =

British A&E consultant (died 2020)

- Born: 4 December 1967
- Died: 20 April 2020 (aged 52)

Manjeet Singh Riyat (4 December 1967 – 20 April 2020) was a British emergency care consultant, and the first person of Sikh heritage to hold such a role in the United Kingdom.

Riyat's death from COVID-19 in the early months of 2020 during the COVID-19 pandemic in England received widespread media coverage in the UK. It was a call to investigate COVID-19 related deaths in some ethnic minorities.

== Biography ==
Manjeet Singh Riyat was born on 4 December 1967. He completed his medical degree at the University of Leicester in 1992. He underwent training at Leicester Royal Infirmary and Lincoln County Hospital and in 2003 he joined Royal Derby Hospital as a consultant in emergency medicine, the first person of Sikh heritage to hold such a role in the United Kingdom. He was appointed head of the emergency department there in 2006, and was chair of the hospital's medical advisory committee and its medical staffing committee.

Riyat taught emergency medicine and served as an examiner for the Royal College of Emergency Medicine from 2007, becoming lead examiner for their fellowship examinations in 2016. He was also a PLAB part 2 examiner with the General Medical Council.

He was one of the first clinical research fellows in academic emergency medicine.

He was married and had two sons.

== Death ==
Riyat died, aged 52, at the hospital where he worked, on 20 April 2020, after contracting COVID-19 during the COVID-19 pandemic in England. In context of the disproportionate rate of COVID-19 related deaths in some ethnic minorities during the early months of 2020, Riyat's death received widespread media coverage in the UK and was a call to investigate further.

== Selected publications ==
- MacNamara, A. F.; Riyat, M. S.; Quinton, D. N. (November 1996). "The Changing Profile of Poisoning and its Management". Journal of the Royal Society of Medicine. 89 (11): 608–610. doi:10.1177/014107689608901104. ISSN 0141-0768. PMC 1295994. PMID 9135587. (co-author)
- Lennon, R. I.; Riyat, M. S.; Hilliam, R.; Anathkrishnan, G.; Alderson, G. (1 February 2007). "Can a normal range of elbow movement predict a normal elbow x ray?". Emergency Medicine Journal. 24 (2): 86–88. doi:10.1136/emj.2006.039792. ISSN 1472-0205. PMC 2658213. PMID 17251609. (co-author)
- Boden, D. G.; Agarwal, A.; Hussain, T.; Martin, S. J.; Radford, N.; Riyat, M. S.; So, K.; Su, Y.; Turvey, A.; Whale, C. I. (February 2016). "Lowering levels of bed occupancy is associated with decreased inhospital mortality and improved performance on the 4-hour target in a UK District General Hospital". Emergency Medicine Journal. 33 (2): 85–90. doi:10.1136/emermed-2014-204479. ISSN 1472-0213. PMID 26380995. S2CID 34866960. (co-author)
