= Glinks Gully =

Settlement in Northland, New Zealand

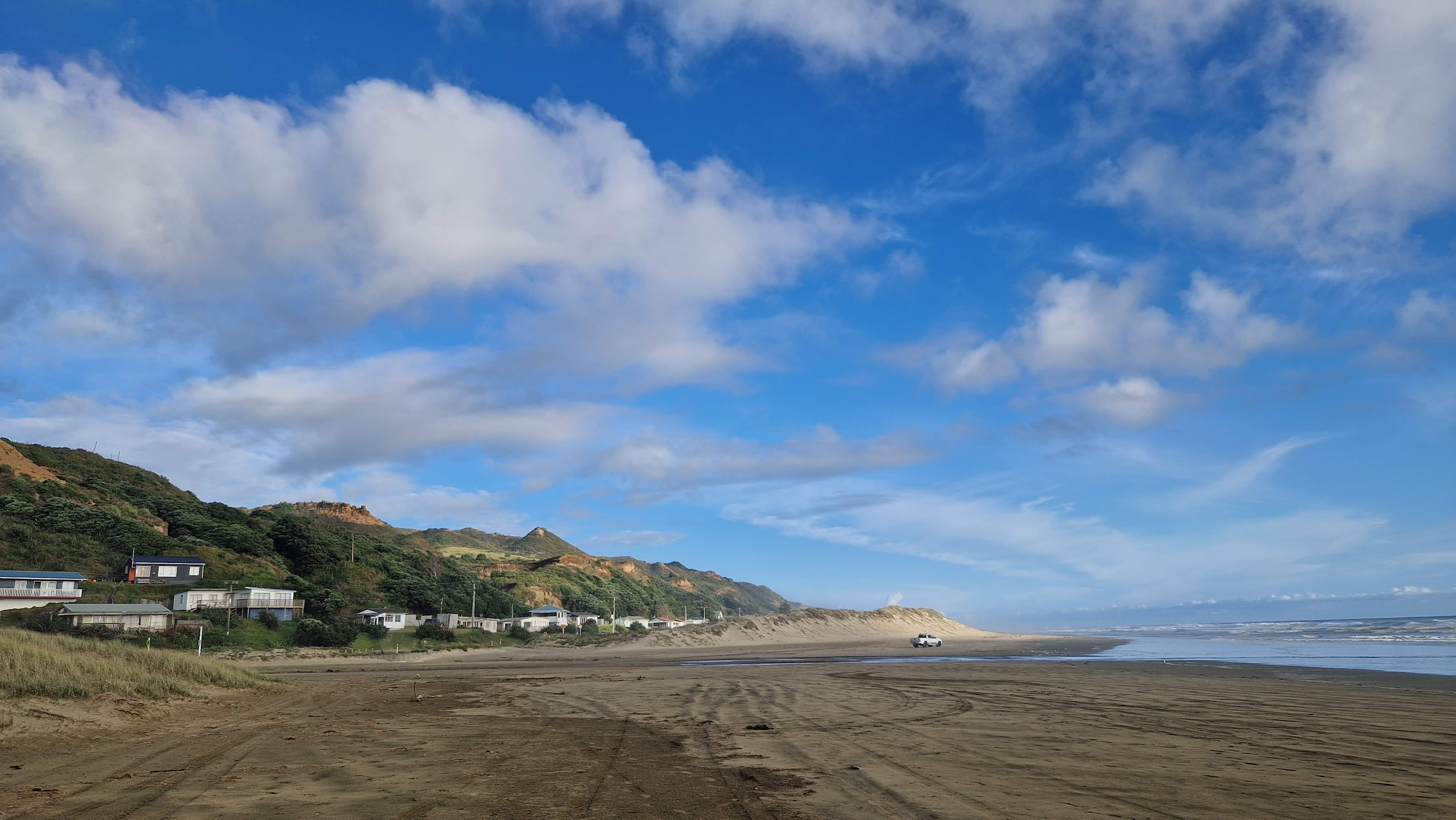
- Glinks Gully, 2023
- Interactive map of Glinks Gully
- Location within Northland Region
- Country: New Zealand
- Region: Northland Region
- District: Kaipara District

Glinks Gully is a small settlement on the west coast of Northland, New Zealand, approximately 16 kilometres (9.9 mi) south of Dargaville. It consists of around 70 houses.

Glinks Gully borders the Tasman Sea with a direct stretch of beach known as Ripirō Beach, the longest driveable beach in New Zealand at 107 kilometres (66 mi).

During the 19th century, the coast near Glinks Gully experienced several shipwrecks. One of the earliest recorded was the Aurora, which was wrecked in 1840 while departing Kaipara Harbour. Another incident occurred in 1851 when the French corvette L'Alcmène was wrecked, resulting in the loss of 12 lives. Survivors of L'Alcmène reported walking three hours south from the wreck site, where they encountered "a broad valley running at right angles to the beach" and, further inland, discovered a small lake. Glinks Gully, located 18 kilometres (11 mi) south of Baylys Beach (the approximate location of the wreck), matches this description, with a small lake situated up a valley from the beach.
