= Richard Jenkins (engineer) =

British engineer

- Born: November 1976 (age 49–50)
- Education: Imperial College
- Engineering career
- Institutions: Saildrone
- Projects: Greenbird

Richard Jenkins is a British engineer from Lymington. He is known for engineering and sailing wind-driven vessels on land, ice and water. In 1999, he founded the Windjet Project while studying mechanical engineering at Imperial College. Since then, he has designed, built and tested four separate speed record craft. Jenkins is the founder and CEO of Saildrone, a company that designs, manufacturers and manages unmanned surface vehicles that sail the world's oceans collecting science data.

== Early years ==
Jenkins was born in England to Australian parents. He was raised in Lymington, a small village near Southampton and on his grandfather's farm in Western Australia. He became interested in sailing and engineering at a young age: he was dinghy sailing at age 10, working on the last airworthy Short Sunderland flying boat at age 12, building an International Moth dinghy in his early teens and doing design work for super maxi yachts while attending college. He first crossed the Atlantic when he was 16. He also helped to sail the Matthew, a replica of John Cabot’s 15th century caravel in which the explorer discovered the island of Newfoundland.

== World land speed record ==
On 26 March 2009, Jenkins broke the world land-speed record for a wind-powered vehicle. He reached 126.1 mph (202.9 km/h) in his land yacht Greenbird on Ivanpah Lake, a dry lake in California's Mojave Desert. The previous record of 116 mph (187 km/h) was set by Americans Bob Dill (engineer/designer) and Bob Schumacher (pilot/builder) on 20 March 1999, driving their wind-powered vehicle the Iron Duck in the same location. "Top speed is actually quite scary. The structure and tyre grip is all at the limit, so keeping it in a straight line under full control takes full concentration," Jenkins told The Guardian.

Greenbird is the fifth iteration of the land yacht that was first known as Windjet. Greenbird is powered by a carbon composite wing that produces thrust similarly to how an airplane wing produces lift.

Jenkins attempted to break the world record for sailing on ice on the frozen Canyon Ferry Reservoir in Montana with a vehicle adapted for ice.

== Saildrone ==
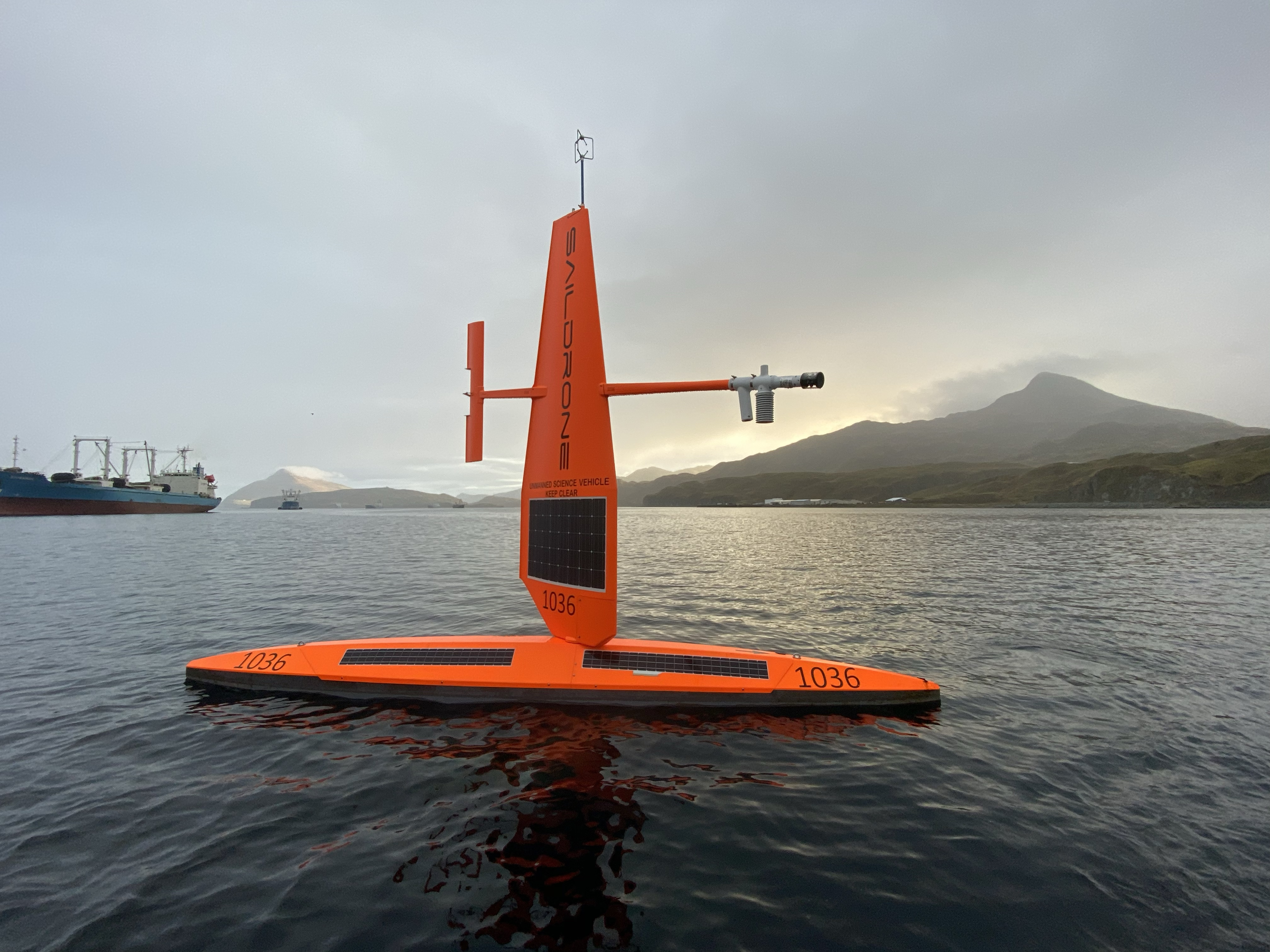
A saildrone is recovered in Dutch Harbor, AK, after the 2019 NOAA Arctic missions.

The innovation that allowed Greenbird to break the land speed record was a unique wing/tail/tab system that produced aerodynamic wing control. A tail mounted midway up the wing allowed for very precise control of the "angle of attack" of the wing to produce maximum power while consuming very little energy. Jenkins adapted that system to an autonomous surface vehicle known as a saildrone and founded a company by the same name. Saildrones are wind powered for propulsion and use solar to power onboard sensors and computers used to gather ocean data

In 2013, Saildrone 1 (SD 1) became the first unmanned surface vehicle to cross an ocean using only wind power. The saildrone was deployed from San Francisco on October 1 and sailed 2100 nautical miles arriving in Kaneohe, Hawaii, 34 days later.

In 2019, SD 1020 became the first unmanned vehicle to complete a circumnavigation of Antarctica, crossing every longitude line in the Southern Ocean.

=== 2019 Antarctic circumnavigation ===
The First Saildrone Antarctic Circumnavigation mission, funded by the Li Ka-shing Foundation, was launched from Point Bluff, New Zealand, on January 19, 2019. The 196-day mission covered 13,670 miles (22,000 km) in the Southern Ocean and returned to the same port on August 3, 2019. During the mission, SD 1020 had to survive freezing temperatures, 50-foot waves, 80 mph winds and even collisions with giant icebergs. SD 1020 had a special "square" wing designed especially for the Southern Ocean. “While the square rig has less performance range than the regular saildrone wing and struggles to sail upwind, it does a great job of sailing downwind and can still get you where you need to go in the Southern Ocean. You inevitably sacrifice maneuverability for survivability, but we have created something that gets the job done and that the Southern Ocean just can’t destroy!" said Jenkins in a company blog post. The voyage is "a technological feat that was unfathomable just a decade ago."

=== Surveyor ===
Having established Saildrone vehicles as the most capable and proven USVs available, Jenkins expanded the technology to address new market needs including lifecycle solutions for offshore wind farms and ocean mapping. The 72-foot (22 m) Saildrone Surveyor, launched in January 2021, is the only autonomous platform capable of performing IHO-compliant bathymetry surveys to depths of 23,000 feet (7,000 m).

=== 2021 Atlantic Hurricane Mission ===
In September 2021, in another world first, Richard successfully sent a Saildrone into the eye of a Category 4 hurricane in the Atlantic Ocean. Saildrone Explorer SD 1045 captured HD video and images from the eye of the storm while collecting data about air-sea interactions that is expected to transform our understanding of hurricane forecasting. “Saildrone is going where no research vessel has ever ventured, sailing right into the eye of the hurricane, gathering data that will transform our understanding of these powerful storms. After conquering the Arctic and Southern Ocean, hurricanes were the last frontier for Saildrone survivability. We are proud to have engineered a vehicle capable of operating in the most extreme weather conditions on earth," Jenkins said in a NOAA press release.

== 2022 Albert A. Michelson Award ==
In April 2022, Jenkins was recognized with the annual Albert A. Michelson Award, presented by the Navy League of the United States. The award honors "a civilian scientist, technical innovator or technical organization for scientific or technical achievement." Jenkins was selected for the award in part for Saildrone's 2021 Atlantic hurricane mission; the award citation stated that the measurements and video collected "could transform our understanding of hurricane forecasting."
