= World Landsailing Organisation =

Sports governing body

- Sport: Landsailing
- Membership: 24 national associations (as of 2018)
- Abbreviation: FISLY
- Founded: 2014
- Headquarters: La Panne, Belgium
- President: (Germany) Hans-Werner Eickstaedt
- Secretary: Antoine de la Fourchadiere

Official website
- www.fisly.org

The World Landsailing Organisation or Fédération Internationale de Sand et Landyachting (FISLY), is an international organisation which governs national associations of land sailing worldwide.

The federation was founded in April 1962 by representatives from Belgium, Germany, the Netherlands, France, and Great Britain.

In October 2018, FISLY became an observer member of the Global Association of International Sports Federations.

As well as promotion and setting the rules of the sport, FISLY has also organised the World Championships since 1975 and the European Championships since 1963.

== Member Associations ==
Article 6 of the Constitution of FISLY gives three different types of members:

- Full members: Full members are national landsailing federations, composed of a minimum of two clubs or federations, who are the only organisation representing landsailing in their nation.
- Associate members: Associate members could also be the national federations for landsailing. Associate members have less voice at the FISLY council and General Assembly than full members. The right to organise international championships is reserved for full members.
- Affiliate members: Associations which may assist meetings of the council of FISLY or the General Assembly, but do not have the right to vote

In 2018, the federation consisted of 16 nations:

Full members	Associate members	Affiliate members
Belgium : Belgische Federatie der Land Yacht Clubs; Germany : Strand Segler Club St. Peter-Ording; Denmark : Romo Strandsejler Club; France : Fédération française de char à voile; United States : North American Land Sailing Association	Argentina : Federacion Argentina carrovelismo; Switzerland; Chile : Carrovelismo en Chile; Spain :Asociación Española de Carrovelismo; Great Britain : British Federation of Sand & Land Yacht Clubs; Ireland : Irish Power Kite and Sandyacht Association; Netherlands : Nederlandse Strandzeilfederatie; Class 2 Association; Internationala Class 3 Association; Class 8 Kite Buggy Association; International Miniyacht (5.60) Class Association; Class Standart Association; Para Kart Association	Brazil : Federação Brasileira de Carro ay Vela; China : China Landsailing Organisation; Djibouti : Djibouti Land Yachting Club, Centre du Char à Voile de Djibouti; Greece : Fisly Representatives; Italy : Carroavela Italy; Lithuania : Lithuanian Ice and Land sailing association; Portugal : Carro à Vela Portugal; Historic Sand Yachts International
