= Windwagon Smith =

American tall tale about a sea captain who traveled across the Kansas prairie

Windwagon Smith is an American tall tale about a sea captain who traveled in a Conestoga wagon, fitted with a sail, across the Kansas prairie. The tale was the subject of a 1961 animated Walt Disney Pictures film, The Saga of Windwagon Smith.

== The legend ==
The tale is based on a story, with some plausible elements, of an incident in Westport, Missouri, in 1853, during America's westward migration. In some versions Windwagon Smith comes sweeping into town with his wind-powered Conestoga wagon complete and working. Other tellings have him inventing the wagon in town, building the craft, and gathering eager passengers, only to have his craft crash or his passengers abandon ship from sea sickness.

By 1850 Westport and nearby Kansas City had displaced Independence, Missouri, as the main outfitting and starting point for traders, trappers, and emigrants heading west on the Santa Fe and Oregon Trails.

=== Historical accounts ===
Contemporary news accounts have at least three real-life inventors of land-sailing, wind-powered wagons in that era. According to the December 1846 issue of the Independence Expositor newspaper, the first was a man named William Thomas. In 1853 Thomas showed a prototype with oversized wheels to the U.S. Army at Fort Leavenworth and formed an Overland Navigation Company. A second account involves Andy Dawson of Oskaloosa. According to Frank Leslie's Illustrated Newspaper, a third account involves Oskaloosa sawmill owner Samuel Peppard, who is said to have invented a sailing wagon in 1860 with at least partial success, according to the magazine's description of its arrival in Fort Kearny, Nebraska—250 miles from his starting point.

== Retellings ==
Wilbur Lang Schramm's short story "Windwagon Smith" won the 1942 O. Henry Award for fiction. It was later included in Windwagon Smith and Other Yarns, which was published in 1947.

Directed by Charles Nichols and with narration by Rex Allen and the Sons of the Pioneers, the Walt Disney cartoon The Saga of Windwagon Smith was released on March 16, 1961.

Since 1972 the annual River Festival in Wichita, Kansas, has chosen an "Admiral Windwagon Smith" from its volunteers to serve as a "costumed, sword-carrying mascot" of the event.
