= Saildrone (company) =

American ocean drone company

Saildrone, Inc.
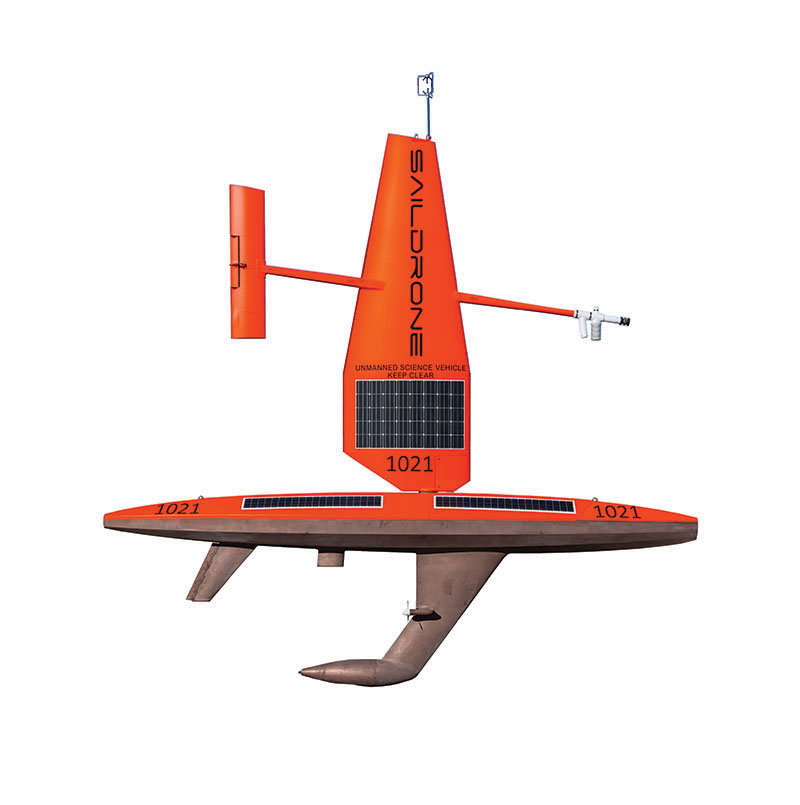
- The 23-foot Saildrone Explorer unmanned surface vehicle
- Type: Private
- Industry: Maritime defense; Ocean Survey
- Founded: 2012
- Founder: Richard Jenkins
- Headquarters: Alameda, California, U.S.
- Key people: Richard Jenkins (CEO) John Mustin (President) Jen Betz (CFO) Robert Kleist (European Managing Director)
- Website: saildrone.com

Saildrone, Inc. is an American company based in Alameda, California, that designs, manufactures, and operates a fleet of unmanned/uncrewed surface vehicles (USVs), or ocean drones, known as "saildrones". The company was founded by engineer Richard Jenkins in 2012.

Saildrone customers and research partners include the various departments of the National Oceanographic and Atmospheric Administration NASA, the US Navy, US Coast Guard, the University of New Hampshire, the University of Rhode Island, the Commonwealth Scientific and Industrial Research Organisation (Australia), the European Center for Medium-range Weather Forecasts, GEOMAR Helmholtz Centre for Ocean Research Kiel (Germany), the Monterey Bay Aquarium Research Institute, and others.

== History ==
=== Founding (2012-2018) ===
Saildrone was founded by Richard Jenkins in 2012.

In 2014, Saildrone began a partnership with the National Oceanic and Atmospheric Administration's Pacific Marine Environmental Laboratory under a Cooperative Research and Development Agreement to develop and refine vehicle capabilities and payload of sensors. Objectives included acoustic fisheries surveys for management and conservation while also collecting metocean data.

Also in 2014, Saildrone and NOAA’s Pacific Marine Environmental Laboratory established a public-private partnership to develop and refine the meteorological and oceanographic sensor suite for the Saildrone USV.

In 2016, Saildrone closed a $14 million Series A funding round. The round was led by Social Capital and included Capricorn Investment Group and Lux Capital. Saildrone had previously received mission-related investment from The Schmidt Family Foundation, a private foundation created by Eric and Wendy Schmidt.

=== Projects and funding (2017-2025) ===
In 2017, two saildrones deployed from San Francisco took part in the NASA-funded Salinity Processes in the Upper-ocean Regional Study 2 (SPURS-2) field campaign as part of their more than six-month Tropical Pacific Observing System (TPOS)-2020 pilot study in the eastern tropical Pacific. The mission compared saildrone measurements with those of the research vessel Revelle and the Woods Hole Oceanographic Institution (WHOI) SPURS-2 buoy. The data collected by the saildrones was found to be in agreement with the ship and buoy, and demonstrated the saildrone to be “an effective platform for observing a wide range of oceanographic variables important to air-sea interaction studies,” according to a paper published in Oceanography.

In 2018, the website DroneBelow reported the company raised a $60 million Series B funding round to scale operations with participation from Horizons Ventures as well as existing investors Social Capital, Capricorn Investment Group, and Lux Capital.

In October 2020, the U.S. Coast Guard Research and Development Center in Hawaii began a 30-day test to "assess low-cost, commercially available autonomous solutions to improve maritime domain awareness in remote regions of the Pacific Ocean." Saildrone was one of two platforms tested.

In 2021, TechCrunch reported the company had raised a $100 million Series C funding round led by Mary Meeker's investment fund Bond Capital with participation from new investors XN, Standard Investments, Emerson Collective, Crowley Maritime Corporation, as well as previous investors Capricorn's Technology Impact Fund, Lux Capital, Social Capital, and Tribe Capital.

In 2022, the Saildrone Surveyor was recognized with the Innovation Award from the Blue Marine Foundation and BOAT International's annual Ocean Awards for revolutionizing ocean mapping. The company says that with 20 Saildrone Surveyors, it should be possible to achieve Seabed 2030's goal of mapping the world's oceans in high resolution by the end of the decade.

Saildrone published its first carbon impact report in 2022.

At the Navy League of the United States's annual Sea Air Space conference, Saildrone announced it has appointed Vice Admiral (ret.) John Mustin, as its first president. Mustin served most recently as the 15th Chief of Navy Reserve, and was formerly the Vice Commander of the United States Fleet Forces Command.

== Vehicles ==
A saildrone is a sailboat-like vehicle equipped with science-grade sensors and machine-learning technology to deliver critical data and intelligence from the ocean.

There are three Saildrone platforms: Explorer, Voyager, and Surveyor. All three Saildrone uncrewed surface vehicles (USVs) combine wind-powered propulsion technology with solar-powered meteorological and oceanographic acoustic, and ISR sensors.

=== Saildrone Explorer ===
The Saildrone Explorer is a 23-foot-long (7.0 m) USV that can sail at an average speed of 3 knots (5.6 km/h; 3.5 mph) (depending on the wind) and stay at sea for up to 365 days. The Explorer is designed for fisheries missions, metocean data collection, ecosystem monitoring, and satellite calibration and validation missions.

=== Saildrone Voyager ===
In August 2021, Seapower Magazine reported the company is adding a new mid-size USV to the fleet: The Voyager is a 33-foot-long (10 m) USV with primary wind power and auxiliary propulsion of a 4kW electric motor for a wide variety of missions including bathymetry (ocean mapping) missions, border patrol and maritime domain awareness. The average speed is 5 knots.

=== Saildrone Surveyor ===
At 65 feet (20m) long and weighs 15 tons, the Surveyor is the largest vehicle in the Saildrone fleet. According to Wired, the Surveyor was first launched in January 2021 and is designed to carry multibeam echo sounders for IHO-compliant bathymetry surveys. Equipped with Kongsberg’s EM304 MKII multibeam echo sounder, the Surveyor can map the ocean seafloor to depths of 33,000 feet (11,000 m). The Surveyor's multibeam echo sounders can map the ocean seafloor to depths of 23,000 feet (7,000 m). It also carries an acoustic Doppler current profiler to measure the speed and direction of ocean currents.

In July 2021, the Surveyor completed its first trans-Pacific mapping mission sailing from San Francisco to Honolulu, Hawaii, and mapping 6,400 square nautical miles (22,000 km^{2}; 8,500 sq mi) of seafloor along the way. Hawaii News Now reported that 20 Surveyors could map the entire ocean in less than 10 years.

In September 2022, it was announced that Austal USA signed an agreement with Saildrone, to build Saildrone Surveyor drones by year end for the US Navy, and other customers.

In April 2024, Saildrone and Thales Australia announced a partnership to integrate the Thales BlueSentry thin-line towed array with the Surveyor for conducting autonomous long-endurance anti-submarine warfare (ASW) missions. During trials, the Surveyor operated continuously for 26 days. While using wind propulsion, it generated near-zero noise, significantly improving the effectiveness of the BlueSentry sonar to detect and classify underwater and surface threats.

=== Saildrone Spectre ===
Spectre is a 170-foot anti-submarine warfare drone boat developed by Saildrone in partnership with Lockheed Martin and Fincantieri, introduced in April 2026. This drone boat can be outfitted for various missions, with space for two Lockheed Mk 70 vertical launching systems. According to Saildrone, other potential payloads include sonar arrays and the Lockheed Joint Air-to-Ground Missile launcher, which is being integrated into Saildrone's smaller Surveyor platform.

Spectre is available in two variants: the Silent Endurance variant, which features the characteristic sail or “wing,” and the Stealth Strike variant, which relies solely on its more robust internal propulsion system. The sail-equipped variant is primarily aimed at anti-submarine warfare and surveillance but can also be fitted with modular VLS cells or other “concealed payloads.” The Stealth Strike variant offers “higher-speed” capabilities and is designed for “low observable missions,” as stated by the company. The Stealth Strike variant has a 5,000-horsepower Caterpillar diesel engine. The unit cruises at 25 knots with a maximum speed of 30 knots for brief sprints.

== Missions ==
=== 2019 Antarctic circumnavigation ===
In January 2019, a consortium of organizations led by the Li Ka Shing Foundation launched an autonomous circumnavigation of Antarctica using a group of saildrones. Researchers from agencies around the world participated including from NOAA, NASA, CSIRO, Palmer Long-Term Ecological Research, the Scripps Institution of Oceanography, the Southern Ocean Observing System, the Japan Agency for Marine-Earth Science and Technology, the Korea Polar Research Institute, the Norwegian Polar Institute, the University of Exeter, the University of Gothenburg, the University of Otago, and the New Zealand National Institute of Water and Atmospheric Research. Bloomberg Businessweek reported that, on August 3, 2019, SD 1020 became the first autonomous vehicle to circumnavigate Antarctica, having spent 196 days in the Southern Ocean sailing 13,670 miles. During the mission, SD 1020 had to survive freezing temperatures, 50-foot (15 m) waves, 80 mph (130 km/h) winds, and collisions with giant icebergs. In order to survive the extreme conditions of the Southern Ocean, the saildrone was equipped with a special "square" wing.

According to a paper published in Geophysical Research Letters by oceanographers Adrienne Sutton, Nancy Williams, and Bronte Tilbrook, one aspect of the mission focused on using Saildrone in situ data collection to better understand the role of the Southern Ocean in regulating the global carbon budget. Assumptions that the Southern Ocean is a significant carbon sink had previously been made using ship-based measurements, which are limited due to challenging ocean conditions in the Southern Ocean. The data collected by the saildrone was used to reduce uncertainty about Southern Ocean CO_{2} uptake: "By directly measuring air and surface seawater carbon dioxide (CO_{2}) and wind speed on the USV, we were able to observe CO_{2} exchange between the ocean and atmosphere every hour during the mission. Using this data set, we estimated potential errors in these measurements as well as other approaches to estimating CO_{2} exchange."

=== 2019 Atlantic crossing ===
In October 2019, SD 1021 became the first autonomous vehicle to sail across the Atlantic Ocean in both directions. SD 1021 arrived in the Solent after sailing from Bermuda and then sailed back to Newport, Rhode Island, completing the 3,402 nautical mile trip in 68 days.

=== 2021 Atlantic hurricane mission ===
In partnership with NOAA, Saildrone deployed five vehicles equipped with "hurricane" wings to the tropical Atlantic Ocean to study air-sea heat exchange to better understand hurricane rapid intensification during the 2021 Atlantic hurricane season. On September 30, 2021, SD 1045 became the first Saildrone Explorer to sail into a category 4 hurricane. It collected ocean data and video from inside Hurricane Sam where the sea state included 50-foot (15 m) waves and wind speeds reached over 120 mph (190 km/h).

The mission was continued in 2022-2024. During the 2024 hurricane season, the Saildrone fleet sailed 42,000 miles and spent 100 hours in sustained tropical storm winds, intercepting seven different tropical storms 16 times.

=== 2021 US Navy 5th Fleet, Task Force 59 ===
In 2021, the U.S. Navy announced that United States Naval Forces Central Command (NAVCENT) had begun operationally testing Saildrone USVs in the Gulf of Aqaba as part of an initiative to integrate unmanned systems and artificial intelligence into U.S. 5th Fleet operations.

=== 2023-2025 US Navy 4th Fleet ===
In 2023, the US 4th Fleet began using Saildrone Voyagers as part of Operation Windward Stack in the Caribbean to expand maritime domain awareness in the region. Seven Saildrone USVs were in operation off the northern coast of Haiti to monitor human smuggling by sea.
