= Aranga, New Zealand =

Aranga
- Coordinates: 35°44′23″S 173°36′49″E
- Country: New Zealand
- Region: Northland Region
- District: Kaipara District

Aranga is a locality in Northland, New Zealand. State Highway 12 passes through it. Ōmāpere is 47 km northwest, and Dargaville is 42 km southeast. The Waipoua Forest is to the north. Maunganui Bluff and the Tasman Sea are to the west, with the small settlement of Aranga Beach lying at the northern end of Ripiro Beach.

Trounson Kauri Park is a 586 ha forest reserve a few kilometres south of Aranga.

Aranga was a centre of the kauri gum industry from 1887 until the late 1940s, one of the last gum extraction areas in New Zealand. A flax mill operated at Aranga from 1890 to 1900.

The local Waikarā Marae is a traditional meeting ground for the Te Roroa. It features the meeting house, Te Uaua.

== Education ==
Aranga School is a coeducational full primary (years 1-8) school with a decile rating of 4 and a roll of 18 (November 2024). The school celebrated its centennial in 2005.
