= Greenbird =

Wind-powered vehicle

Greenbird is a wind-powered vehicle that broke the land speed record for sail-powered vehicles at the dry Ivanpah Lake on March 26, 2009. It was built by the British engineer Richard Jenkins. Greenbird reached a peak speed of 126.1 mph (202.9 km/h).

== Construction ==
Greenbird, sponsored by Ecotricity, was described as being "a very high performance sailboat". It uses a rigid vertical wing, instead of the conventional sail, to generate thrust, in the same manner that the wing of an aeroplane generates lift. The only metal in the vehicle is in the wheels and the wing bearings; the remainder is made of carbon composite materials. The vehicle weighs about six hundred kilograms. According to Jenkins, the light weight and aerodynamic shape of the vehicle allows it to attain speeds three to five times faster than the speed of the wind. Greenbird is the fifth in a series of wind-powered land vehicles that Jenkins had constructed in his efforts to break the speed record. Jenkins said he had been trying to break the record for the past ten years in different locations, such as Australia, Britain, and the United States, but weather conditions were not suitable for him to reach maximum speeds.
