= Ivanpah Lake =

Lake in the state of California, United States

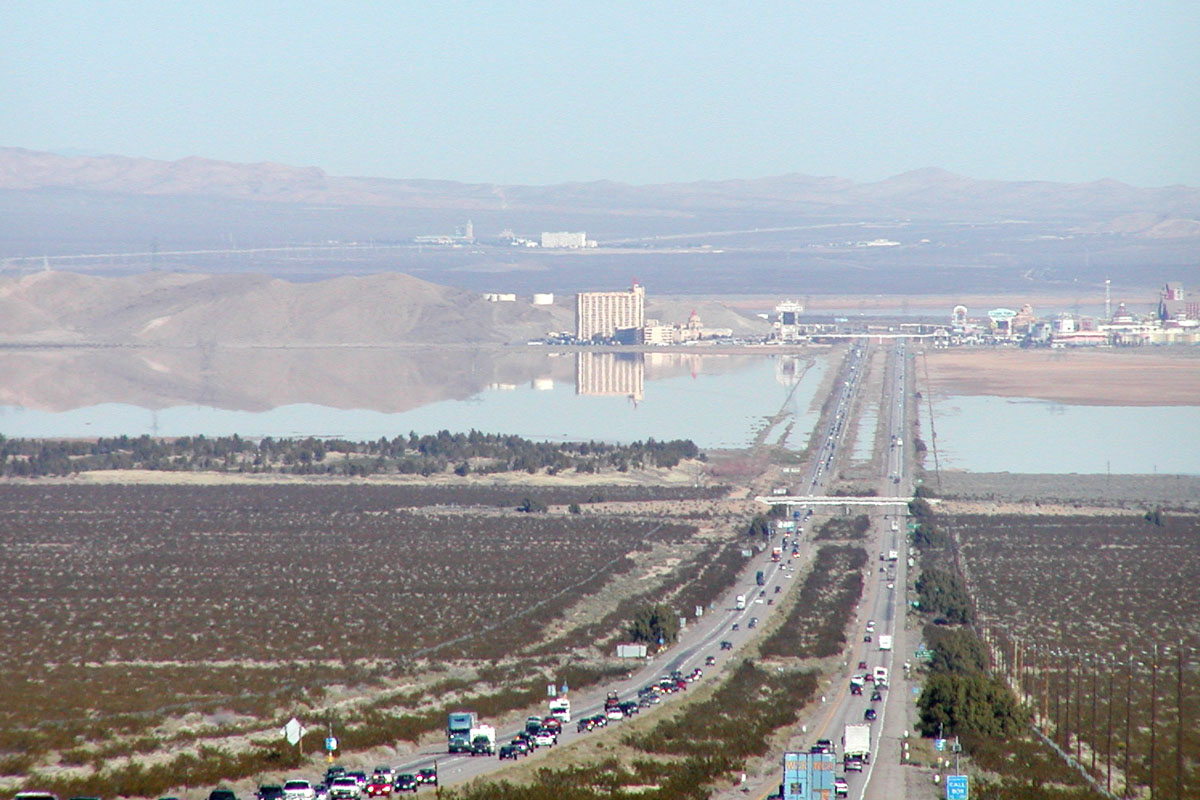
- The lake filled with water after the heavy rains of 2004–2005

- Location within California Location within the United States
- Location: Mojave Desert; San Bernardino County, California
- Coordinates: 35.5506°N 115.3959°W
- Lake type: Endorheic basin
- Basin countries: United States
- Max. length: 20 km (12 mi)
- Max. width: 5 km (3.1 mi)
- Surface area: 34 km^{2} (13 sq mi)
- Shore length^{1}: 45 km (28 mi)
- Surface elevation: 795 m (2,608 ft)
- References: U.S. Geological Survey Geographic Names Information System: Ivanpah Lake
- ^{1} Shore length is not a well-defined measure.

Ivanpah Lake is a dry lake bed in the Mojave Desert of San Bernardino County, California on the border of California and Nevada. Nestled in the Ivanpah Valley near Primm on Interstate 15, the 13-square-mile (34 km^{2}) lake is almost entirely within California. At the north edge of the lake lie the Nevada Welcome Center (closed) and a California Lottery retailer. It is a popular place for land sailing and kite buggying.

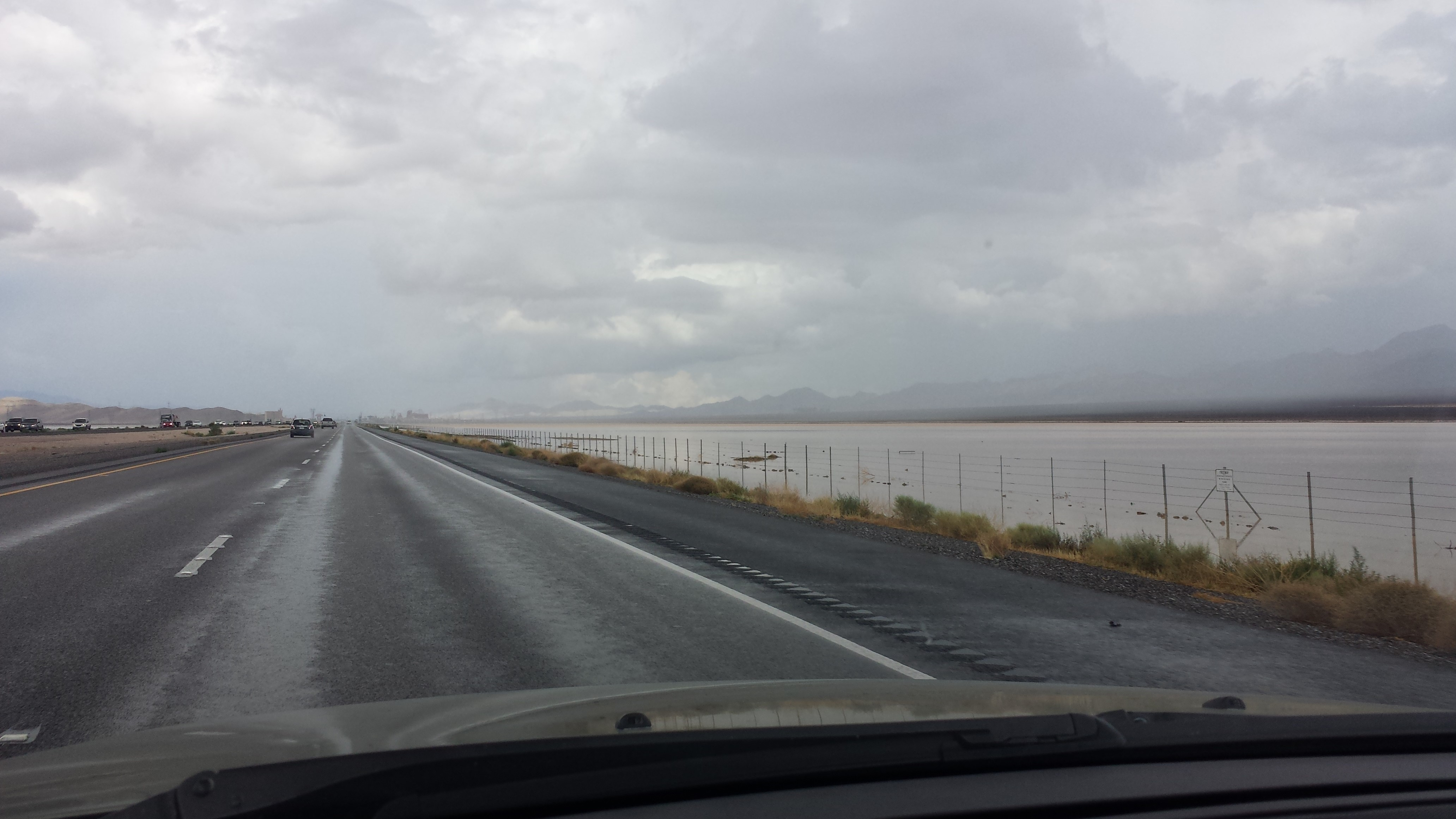
View of Ivanpah Dry Lake from northbound I-15 after an early August rain (with Primm in the distance)

On March 26, 2009, the world land speed record for a wind-powered vehicle was set here by the Greenbird, clocked at 126.1 mph (202.9 km/h).

== Environmental contamination ==
Hundreds of thousands of gallons of water carrying radioactive waste from rare earth element mining spilled into and around Ivanpah Lake.

In the 1980s, the Mountain Pass rare earth mine began piping wastewater as far as 14 miles to evaporation ponds on or near Ivanpah Dry Lake, east of Interstate 15 near Nevada. This pipeline repeatedly ruptured during cleaning operations to remove mineral deposits called scale. The scale is radioactive because of the presence of thorium and radium, which occur naturally in the rare earth ore. A federal investigation later found that some 60 spills—some unreported—occurred between 1984 and 1998, when the pipeline was shut down. In all, about 600,000 US gallons (2,300,000 L; 500,000 imp gal) of radiological and other hazardous waste flowed onto the desert floor, according to federal authorities. By the end of the 1990s, Unocal had been hit with a cleanup order and a San Bernardino County district attorney's lawsuit. The company paid more than $1.4 million in fines and settlements. After preparing a cleanup plan and completing an extensive environmental study, Unocal in 2004 won approval of a county permit that allowed the mine to operate for another 30 years. In 2008, Unocal/Chevron sold the mine to privately held Molycorp Minerals LLC, a company formed to revive the Mountain Pass Mine.

== In popular culture ==
Ivanpah Lake appears in the 2010 videogame Fallout: New Vegas.

== See also ==
- List of lakes in California
