= Rachel Hilliam =

British statistician

Rachel M. Hilliam is a British statistician, a scholar of statistics education, and a former medical statistician. She is a professor of statistics at the Open University, where she heads the School of Mathematics and Statistics.

== Education and career ==
Hilliam received a 2000 Ph.D. from De Montfort University for her dissertation Statistical discrimination with disease categories subject to misclassification.

She joined the Open University in 2011, after previously serving as the medical statistician for Derby Hospitals Trust. She became the founding chair of the Alliance for Data Science Professionals, an accreditation organisation for data science founded jointly in 2022 by the Royal Statistical Society, British Computer Society, and Institute of Mathematics and its Applications.

== Recognition ==
Hilliam received the 2024 Chambers Medal of the Royal Statistical Society, jointly with John MacInnes, for her outstanding service to the society. She was the Teaching Statistics Trust Lecturer for 2025–2026. She was named as an officer of the Order of the British Empire (OBE) in the 2026 Birthday Honours.
