= Ripirō Beach =

Beach on the coast of New Zealand

- Beach
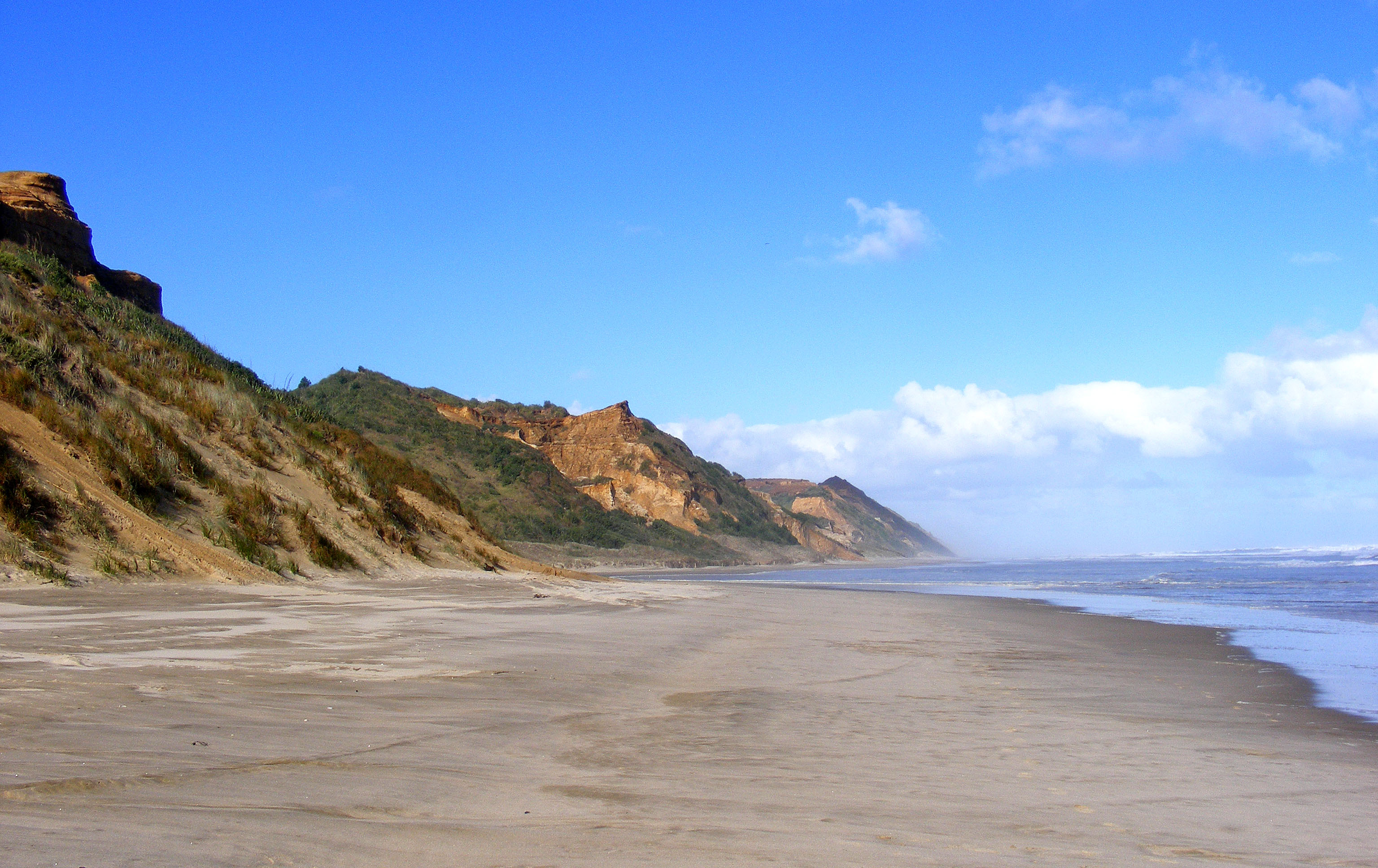
- Ripirō Beach, looking south from near the hamlet of Baylys Beach

- Location within New Zealand
- Coordinates: 36°03′S 173°50′E
- Location: Northland region
- Water bodies: Tasman Sea

Dimensions
  - Length: 107 kilometres (66 mi)

Ripirō Beach is a sandy stretch on the west coast of Northland, New Zealand, extending from the Maunganui Bluff in the north down the Pouto Peninsula to the Kaipara Harbour mouth in the south.

At 66 miles (107 km) long it is the longest driveable beach in New Zealand, longer than the more famous but erroneously named Ninety Mile Beach further north. It is straight, and backed by high sand dunes for most of this length. The beach incorporates the coastal settlements of Baylys Beach, Glinks Gully and Omamari.

The swamp at Omamari was drained in 1898, in order for the area to be dug for kauri gum.

This beach is home of the famous local shellfish delicacy the toheroa. Overexploitation in the 1950s and 1960s caused the population of the shellfish to decline so much that public gathering of the shellfish is now prohibited.

It is the site of numerous shipwrecks, with 110 confirmed shipwrecks on Ripirō Beach and neighbouring Kaipara Harbour recorded between 1834 and 1994. Notable ships wrecked on Ripirō Beach include the French corvette L'Alcmene (1851) and the yacht Askoy (1994).

== History ==
Before European settlement, Ripirō formed an important north–south travel route for Māori. With much of inland Northland covered in dense kauri forest, the open west coast provided one of the easiest ways to travel between the Kaipara Harbour and areas farther north. The beach and surrounding country were also important for settlement and food gathering, including fishing and the collection of shellfish such as toheroa. Ripirō is highly significant in Māori tradition: Maunganui Bluff was an important coastal landmark remembered in northern oriori and waiata, while traditions record the landings of the ancestral waka Māmari at Ōmāmari and Māhuhu-ki-te-rangi along this coast.

During James Cook's first voyage to New Zealand, the sandy west coast north of the Kaipara Harbour was charted as "The Desart Coast". On 4 January 1770 Cook described the land south of about latitude 35°45′S as wearing "a most desolate and inhospitable aspect", with "long sand Hills, with hardly any Green thing upon them". His chart places "The Desart Coast" immediately north of "False Bay", his name for the entrance to Kaipara Harbour. An Encyclopaedia of New Zealand later identified the coastal sand belt west of the Northern Wairoa as the area Cook called "The Desert Coast".

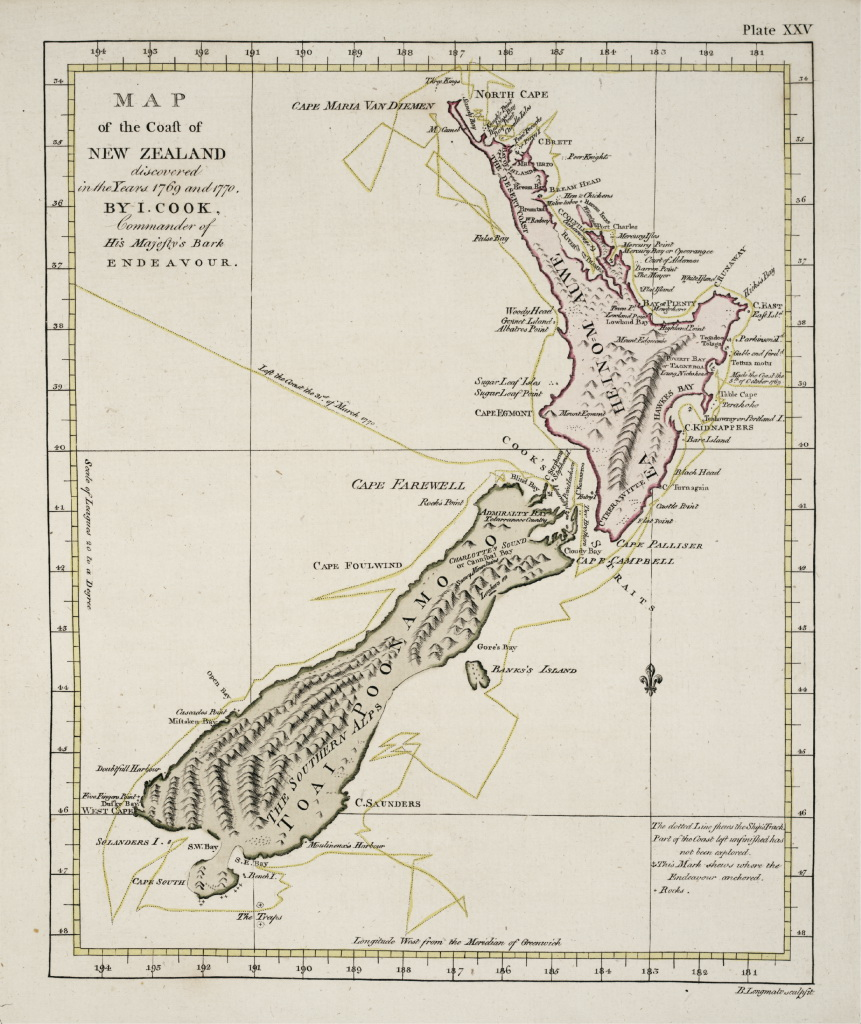
Chart of New Zealand, explored in 1769 and 1770 by Lieut. James Cook, commander of the barque Endeavour. Shows the Ripiro Beach are labeled as "The Desert Coast".

In either 1807 or 1808 at Moremonui Gully where it enters Ripirō Beach, 19 kilometres (12 miles) south of Maunganui Bluff, Ngāti Whātua ambushed Ngāpuhi in the Battle of Moremonui, the first Māori battle to involve muskets, initiating a larger conflict which became known as the Musket Wars.
