= Baylys Beach =

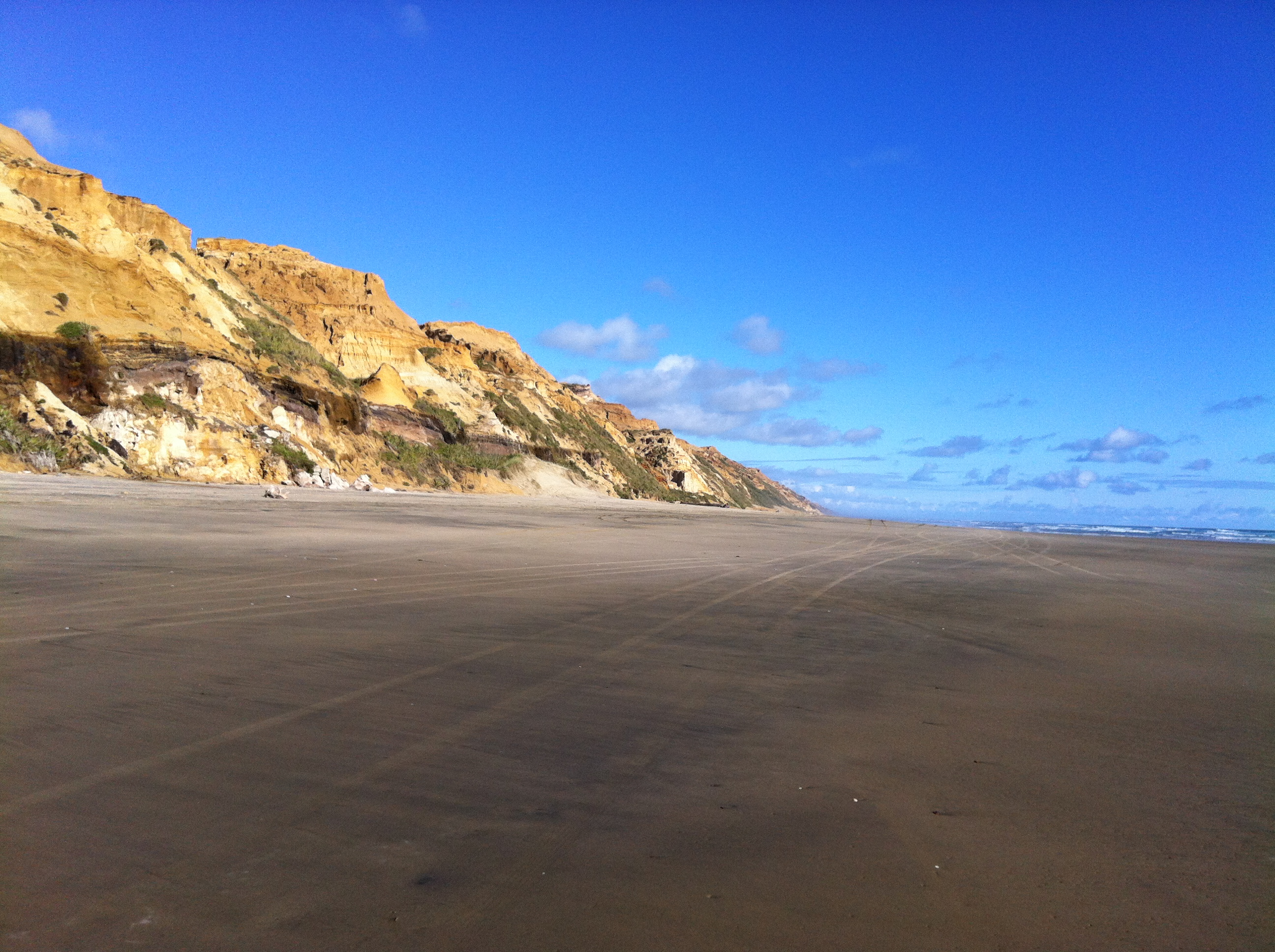
- Baylys Beach
- Interactive map of Baylys Beach
- Coordinates: 35.951°S 173.748°E
- Country: New Zealand
- Region: Northland Region
- District: Kaipara District
- Ward: West Coast-Central Ward
- Electorates: Northland; Te Tai Tokerau

Government
  - Territorial Authority: Kaipara District Council
  - Regional council: Northland Regional Council
  - Mayor of Kaipara: Jonathan Larsen
  - Northland MP: Grant McCallum
  - Te Tai Tokerau MP: Mariameno Kapa-Kingi

Area
  - Total: 0.56 km^{2} (0.22 sq mi)

Population (June 2025)
  - Total: 390
  - Density: 700/km^{2} (1,800/sq mi)

Baylys Beach is a beach and settlement on the west coast of Northland, New Zealand. The beach is on the northern side of the settlement, with Ripirō Beach on the southern side. Dargaville is 13 km (8.1 mi) to the east.

== History ==
The Battle of Moremonui was fought between the Ngāti Whātua and Ngāpuhi iwi about 6 km northwest of Baylys Beach in 1807 or 1808.

The coast saw many shipwrecks during the 19th century. Aurora was wrecked in 1840 when leaving Kaipara Harbour and the French corvette L'Alcméne was wrecked in 1851 with the loss of 12 lives.

The beach may have been named after an early settler named Bayly who owned 20 km of the shoreline. The name has been in use since at least 1918.

== Demographics ==
Statistics New Zealand describes Baylys Beach as a rural settlement, which covers 0.56 km^{2} (0.22 sq mi) and had an estimated population of 390 as of June 2025, with a population density of 696 people per km^{2}. Baylys Beach is part of the larger Kaipara Coastal statistical area.

Historical population
Year	Pop.	±% p.a.
2006	279	—
2013	309	+1.47%
2018	309	+0.00%
2023	387	+4.60%

Baylys Beach had a population of 387 in the 2023 New Zealand census, an increase of 78 people (25.2%) since the 2018 census, and an increase of 78 people (25.2%) since the 2013 census. There were 186 males and 204 females in 165 dwellings. 3.9% of people identified as LGBTIQ+. The median age was 50.5 years (compared with 38.1 years nationally). There were 63 people (16.3%) aged under 15 years, 36 (9.3%) aged 15 to 29, 195 (50.4%) aged 30 to 64, and 93 (24.0%) aged 65 or older.

People could identify as more than one ethnicity. The results were 83.7% European (Pākehā); 22.5% Māori; 4.7% Pasifika; 5.4% Asian; 0.8% Middle Eastern, Latin American and African New Zealanders (MELAA); and 7.8% other, which includes people giving their ethnicity as "New Zealander". English was spoken by 96.9%, Māori language by 3.1%, and other languages by 10.1%. No language could be spoken by 2.3% (e.g. too young to talk). The percentage of people born overseas was 21.7, compared with 28.8% nationally.

Religious affiliations were 31.8% Christian, 1.6% Islam, 0.8% New Age, and 3.1% other religions. People who answered that they had no religion were 52.7%, and 10.1% of people did not answer the census question.

Of those at least 15 years old, 51 (15.7%) people had a bachelor's or higher degree, 174 (53.7%) had a post-high school certificate or diploma, and 81 (25.0%) people exclusively held high school qualifications. The median income was $34,100, compared with $41,500 nationally. 27 people (8.3%) earned over $100,000 compared to 12.1% nationally. The employment status of those at least 15 was that 141 (43.5%) people were employed full-time, 57 (17.6%) were part-time, and 6 (1.9%) were unemployed.
