= Sun Magic 44 =

Sailboat class

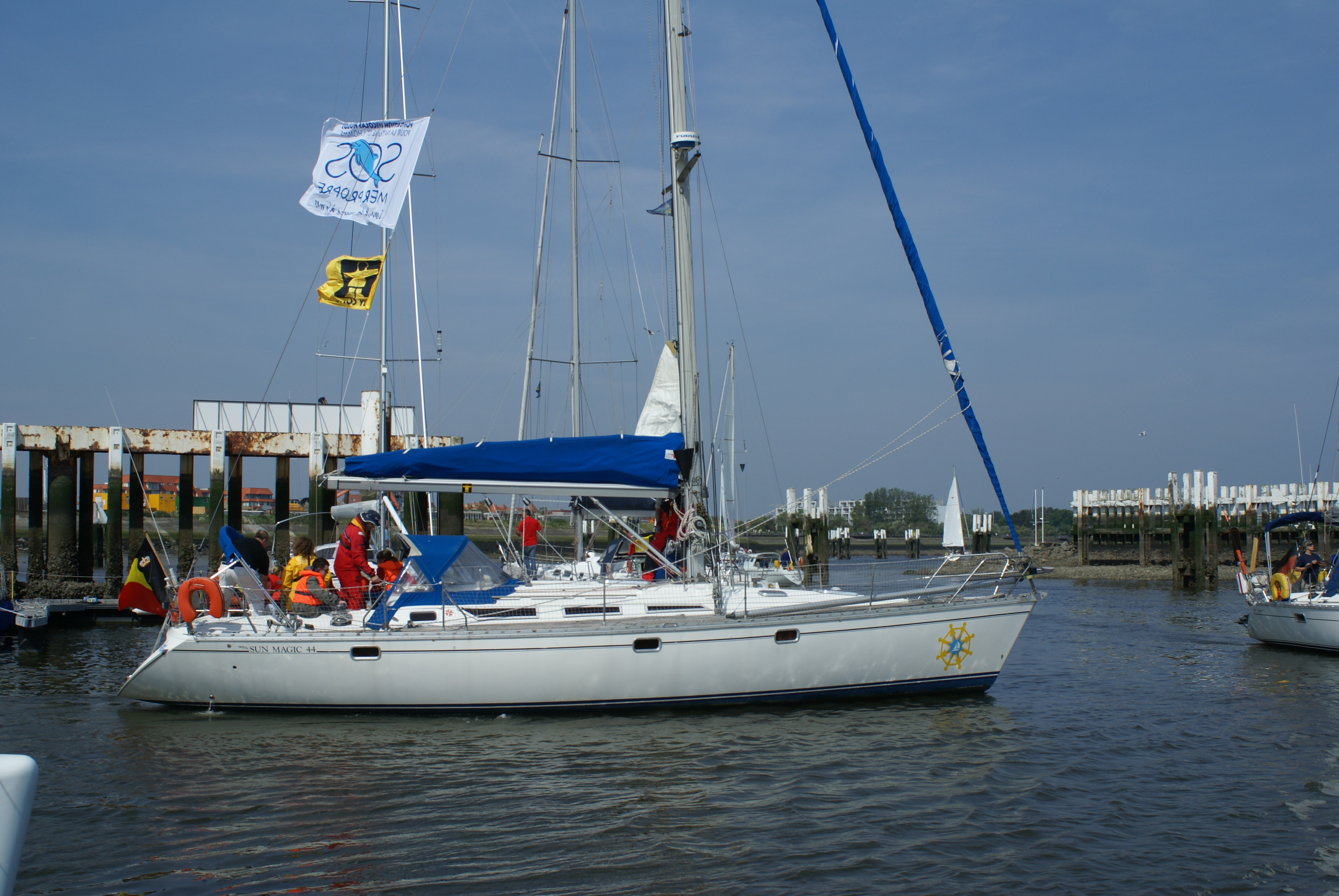

Development
- Designer: Daniel Andrieu
- Location: France
- Year: 1987
- No. built: ~700
- Builder: Jeanneau
- Role: Cruiser-Racer
- Name: Sun Magic 44

Boat
- Displacement: 22,050 lb (10,002 kg)
- Draft: 6.96 ft (2.12 m)

Hull
- Type: monohull
- Construction: fiberglass
- LOA: 43.75 ft (13.34 m)
- LWL: 34.75 ft (10.59 m)
- Beam: 13.92 ft (4.24 m)
- Engine: Yanmar Turbo JH-TE 55 hp (41 kW) diesel engine

Hull appendages
- Keel: fin keel
- Ballast: 8,155 lb (3,699 kg)
- Rudder: spade-type rudder

Rig
- Rig type: Bermuda rig
- I foretriangle height: 51.51 ft (15.70 m)
- J foretriangle base: 16.57 ft (5.05 m)
- P mainsail luff: 44.79 ft (13.65 m)
- E mainsail foot: 15.75 ft (4.80 m)

Sails
- Sailplan: masthead sloop
- Mainsail area: 404 sq ft (37.5 m^{2})
- Jib/genoa area: 385 sq ft (35.8 m^{2})
- Spinnaker area: 1,381 sq ft (128.3 m^{2})
- Other sails: genoa: 654 sq ft (60.8 m^{2}) solent: 509 sq ft (47.3 m^{2}) storm jib: 108 sq ft (10.0 m^{2})
- Upwind sail area: 1,058 sq ft (98.3 m^{2})
- Downwind sail area: 1,785 sq ft (165.8 m^{2})

Racing
- PHRF: 108

The Sun Magic 44 is a French sailboat that was designed by Daniel Andrieu as a cruiser-racer and first built in 1987. The design was also sold as the Sun Odyssey 44.

The design was licensed for production to Olympic Marine of Greece as the Atlantic 44 and first built in 1990.

== Production ==
The design was built by Jeanneau in France, between 1987 and 1993, with about 700 boats completed, but it is now out of production.

== Design ==
The Sun Magic 44 is a recreational keelboat, built predominantly of fiberglass, with wood trim. It has a masthead sloop rig, with a deck-stepped mast, two sets of unswept spreaders and aluminum spars with discontinuous stainless steel wire rigging. The hull has a raked stem, a reverse transom, an internally mounted spade-type rudder, with a partial skeg, controlled by a wheel and a fixed fin keel or optional stub keel and centerboard.

The fin keel model displaces 22,050 lb (10,002 kg) and carries 8,155 lb (3,699 kg) of iron ballast, while the centerboard version displaces 23,163 lb (10,507 kg) and carries 9,149 lb (4,150 kg) of ballast, consisting of exterior cast iron ballast and a steel centerboard.

The keel-equipped version of the boat has a draft of 6.96 ft (2.12 m), while the centerboard-equipped version has a draft of 8.40 ft (2.56 m) with the centerboard extended and 4.90 ft (1.49 m) with it retracted, allowing operation in shallow water.

The boat is fitted with a Japanese Yanmar Turbo JH-TE diesel engine of 55 hp (41 kW) for docking and maneuvering. The fuel tank holds 58 U.S. gallons (220 L; 48 imp gal) and the fresh water tank has a capacity of 127 U.S. gallons (480 L; 106 imp gal).

The design has sleeping accommodation for eight people, with a double "V"-berth in the bow cabin, a second bunk forward port, a U-shaped settee in the main cabin and two aft cabins with double berths, plus a pilot berth on the starboard side. The galley is located amidships on the starboard side. The galley is U-shaped and is equipped with a two-burner stove, an ice box and a double sink. A navigation station is aft of the galley, on the starboard side. There are two heads, one just aft of the bow cabin on the starboard side and one on the port side aft. Cabin maximum headroom is 76 in (193 cm).

For sailing downwind the design may be equipped with a symmetrical spinnaker of 1,381 sq ft (128.3 m^{2}).

The design has a hull speed of 7.90 kn (14.63 km/h) and a PHRF handicap range of 108-117 for the fin keel version and 105-126 for the shoal draft keel model.

== See also ==
- List of sailing boat types
