= Ślusarek =

Ślusarek is a Polish surname meaning either "son of a locksmith" or "locksmith's apprentice}}. Notable people with the surname include:

- James Slusarek, birth name of Jim McGuinn (born 1966), American radio personality
- Maciej Ślusarek, sailor from Polish Scamp Sailing Team
- Shawn Slusarek, musician from Necrophagia
