= Sun Odyssey 319 =

2018 recreational keelboat

Development
- Designer: Jeanneau Design Office
- Location: Poland
- Year: 2018
- Builder: Jeanneau
- Role: Cruiser
- Name: Sun Odyssey 319

Boat
- Displacement: 11,244 lb (5,100 kg)
- Draft: 6.07 ft (1.85 m)

Hull
- Type: monohull
- Construction: fiberglass
- LOA: 32.77 ft (9.99 m)
- LWL: 29.82 ft (9.09 m)
- Beam: 11.35 ft (3.46 m)
- Engine: Yanmar 21 hp (16 kW) diesel engine

Hull appendages
- Keel: fin keel with weighted bulb
- Ballast: 3,638 lb (1,650 kg)
- Rudder: dual spade-type rudders

Rig
- Rig type: Bermuda rig
- I foretriangle height: 36.42 ft (11.10 m)
- J foretriangle base: 11.92 ft (3.63 m)
- P mainsail luff: 35.50 ft (10.82 m)
- E mainsail foot: 12.42 ft (3.79 m)

Sails
- Sailplan: 7/8 fractional rigged sloop
- Mainsail area: 248 sq ft (23.0 m^{2})
- Other sails: genoa: 241 sq ft (22.4 m^{2}) solent: 183 sq ft (17.0 m^{2})
- Upwind sail area: 488 sq ft (45.3 m^{2})

The Sun Odyssey 319 is a recreational keelboat. A development of the Polish Delphia 31, it was built by Jeanneau in Poland, starting in 2018, and is now out of production.

In 2019, it was named Best Cruising Monohull Under 40ft, by Sail Magazine.

== Design ==
Built of solid polyester fiberglass, the hard-chined hull has a nearly plumb stem, dual internally mounted spade-type rudders controlled by a folding wheel and a fixed fin keel or optional stub wing keel and centerboard, which retracts under the main cabin table. It has an open reverse transom with a swimming platform; a fold-down transom was a factory option. The keel-equipped version of the boat has a draft of 6.07 ft (1.85 m), while the centerboard-equipped version has a draft of 5.5 ft (1.7 m) with the centerboard extended and 2.42 ft (0.74 m) with it retracted, allowing operation in shallow water. The design has a hull speed of 7.32 kn (13.56 km/h).

It has a fractional sloop rig, with a deck-stepped mast, two sets of swept spreaders and aluminum spars with discontinuous 1X19 stainless steel wire rigging. It has a Seldén mast and Technique Voile sails. A bowsprit and in-mast furling mainsail were factory options.

The design has six berths, with a V-berth, two straight settee berths in the main cabin and an aft cabin with a double berth on the port side. The galley is on the port side just forward of the companionway ladder. The galley is L-shaped and is equipped with a two-burner stove, an ice box and a double sink. A navigation station is opposite the galley, on the starboard side. The head is located aft on the starboard side, next to the companionway. Cabin maximum headroom is 77 in (196 cm).

== Reception ==
In a 2019 review for Sail Magazine, Charles J. Doane found that some of the smaller sail plans, including then one he tested on the water, were under-powered. He concluded, "For anyone looking for a modern compact cruising sailboat this is a hard vessel to ignore. With its versatile sailplan, deep and shoal-draft options, comfortable spacious cockpit and eminently functional interior, the Sun Odyssey 319 makes for a great starter boat for a young family or a couple. It would also be a great retirement boat for older sailors looking to downsize from something larger."

In a 2019 Cruising World review, Herb McCormick wrote, "the Jeanneau Sun Odyssey 319 had me at hello. Well, more accurately, it won me over soon after we’d hoisted sail last October off Annapolis, Maryland, during our Boat of the Year sea trials in a gusty 15- to 20-knot northerly on Chesapeake Bay. With a couple of reefs in the mainsail and a turn or two on the 85 percent self-tacking furling jib, the 32-footer put on a peppy display of get-up-and-go, easily knocking off a solid 6 knots hard on the wind."
