= Sun Odyssey 409 =

Sailboat class

Development
- Designer: Philippe Briand
- Location: France
- Year: 2010
- No. built: about 300
- Builder: Jeanneau
- Role: Cruiser
- Name: Sun Odyssey 409

Boat
- Displacement: 17,328 lb (7,860 kg)
- Draft: 6.89 ft (2.10 m)

Hull
- Type: monohull
- Construction: fiberglass
- LOA: 40.49 ft (12.34 m)
- LWL: 36.09 ft (11.00 m)
- Beam: 13.09 ft (3.99 m)
- Engine: Yanmar 3JH5-CE 40 hp (30 kW) diesel engine

Hull appendages
- Keel: fin keel with weighted bulb
- Ballast: 4,982 lb (2,260 kg)
- Rudder: spade-type rudder

Rig
- Rig type: Bermuda rig
- I foretriangle height: 50.85 ft (15.50 m)
- J foretriangle base: 14.83 ft (4.52 m)
- P mainsail luff: 49.21 ft (15.00 m)
- E mainsail foot: 16.08 ft (4.90 m)

Sails
- Sailplan: fractional rigged sloop
- Mainsail area: 468 sq ft (43.5 m^{2})
- Jib/genoa area: 304 sq ft (28.2 m^{2})
- Spinnaker area: 1,270 sq ft (118 m^{2})
- Gennaker area: 1,173 sq ft (109.0 m^{2})
- Other sails: genoa: 496 sq ft (46.1 m^{2}) solent: 350 sq ft (33 m^{2}); Code 0: 753 sq ft (70.0 m^{2})
- Upwind sail area: 964 sq ft (89.6 m^{2})
- Downwind sail area: 1,738 sq ft (161.5 m^{2})

Racing
- PHRF: 66-99

The Sun Odyssey 409 is a French sailboat that was designed by Philippe Briand as a cruiser and first built in 2010.

A version for the yacht charter market was designated the Sunsail 41. The design replaced the Sun Odyssey 39i in the manufacturer's product line and was in turn replaced in production by the Sun Odyssey 419 in 2019.

The boat was named the "2011 - European Yacht of the Year: Family Cruiser".

The 2012 Sun Odyssey 41 DS uses the same hull design as the Sun Odyssey 409.

== Production ==
The design was built by Jeanneau in France, from 2010 to 2015, with about 300 boats completed, but it is now out of production. It was also produced at Jeanneau's US factory in Marion, South Carolina.

== Design ==
The Sun Odyssey 409 is a recreational keelboat, built predominantly of polyester fiberglass, with wood trim. The hard-chined hull is hand-laid solid fiberglass, while the deck is injection molded with a balsa core. It has a fractional sloop rig, with a deck-stepped mast, two sets of swept spreaders and aluminum spars with 1X19 stainless steel wire rigging. The hull has a plumb stem, a reverse transom with a fold-down tailgate swimming platform, an internally mounted spade-type rudder controlled by dual wheels and a fixed L-shaped fin keel with a weighted bulb or optional shoal-draft keel. The fin keel model displaces 17,328 lb (7,860 kg) empty and carries 4,982 lb (2,260 kg) of cast iron ballast, while the shoal draft version displaces 17,791 lb (8,070 kg) empty and carries 5,445 lb (2,470 kg) of cast iron ballast. There is a liferaft locker located below the cockpit sole.

The boat has a draft of 6.89 ft (2.10 m) with the standard keel and 5.09 ft (1.55 m) with the optional shoal draft keel.

The boat is fitted with a Japanese Yanmar 3JH5-CE diesel engine of 40 hp (30 kW) with a three-blade fixed propeller for docking and maneuvering. The fuel tank holds 53 U.S. gallons (200 L; 44 imp gal) and the fresh water tank has a capacity of 87 U.S. gallons (330 L; 72 imp gal).

The design was built in two and three cabin versions. The two cabin layout has sleeping accommodation for four people, with a double "V"-berth in the bow cabin, a U-shaped settee and additional two seats in the main cabin and an aft cabin with a double berth on the starboard side, with a storage space to port. The three-cabin model adds a third cabin aft to port in place of the storage. The galley is located on the port side just forward of the companionway ladder. The galley is L-shaped and is equipped with a two-burner stove, an ice box and a double sink. There are two heads, one in the bow cabin on the starboard side and one on the port side in the aft cabin. Cabin headroom is 77 in (196 cm). Twin 45 watt solar panels were a factory option, the first Jeanneau boat to offer this.

For sailing downwind the design may be equipped with a symmetrical spinnaker of 1,270 sq ft (118 m^{2}), an asymmetrical spinnaker of 1,173 sq ft (109.0 m^{2}) or a Code 0 of 753 sq ft (70.0 m^{2}).

The design has a hull speed of 8.05 kn (14.91 km/h) and a PHRF handicap of 66 to 99.

== Operational history ==
In a 2010 boats.com review, Zuzana Prochazka wrote, "the plumb bow, low coachroof with its long, non-opening side portlights, and an angular transom make the boat look serious, fast and maybe a little intimidating. She looks like a force to be reckoned with."

In a 2011 Cruising World review, Tim Murphy wrote, "the 409 puts a host of innovative details on a relatively conventional platform—with just one exception. While the hull’s basic dimensions are consistent with a typical modern cruising boat, the Jeanneau Sun Odyssey 409 has a hard chine running from about amidships aft."

In a 2011 review for Sail Magazine, Charles J. Doane wrote, " In light to moderate conditions on Biscayne Bay (8 to 10 knots of wind, slowly building to 12) with the rig properly tweaked, the boat tracked well and I found the helm to be nicely balanced and forgiving. In lighter winds that morning we occasionally topped 5 knots sailing close-hauled, and I was able to leave the wheel unattended for long periods without the boat falling off. In somewhat stronger wind later on, we easily topped 6 knots on a close reach, and the helm stayed balanced, with no tendency to round up when the wheel was released. In significantly stronger wind (15 knots, gusting to 20) during my earlier sail, I found the boat was reassuringly stiff, thanks in part to the hard chine in the topsides running aft from amidships."

== See also ==
- List of sailing boat types
