= Sun Odyssey 509 =

Sailboat class

Development
- Designer: Philippe Briand
- Location: France
- Year: 2011
- Builder: Jeanneau
- Role: Cruiser

Boat
- Displacement: 30,644 lb (13,900 kg)
- Draft: 7.48 ft (2.28 m)

Hull
- Type: monohull
- Construction: fiberglass
- LOA: 50.46 ft (15.38 m)
- LWL: 45.67 ft (13.92 m)
- Beam: 15.39 ft (4.69 m)
- Engine: Yanmar 75 hp (56 kW) diesel engine

Hull appendages
- Keel: fin keel with weighted bulb
- Ballast: 9,480 lb (4,300 kg)
- Rudder: spade-type rudder

Rig
- Rig type: Bermuda rig
- I foretriangle height: 62.53 ft (19.06 m)
- J foretriangle base: 18.93 ft (5.77 m)
- P mainsail luff: 57.41 ft (17.50 m)
- E mainsail foot: 19.68 ft (6.00 m)

Sails
- Sailplan: 9/10 fractional rigged sloop
- Mainsail area: 657 sq ft (61.0 m^{2})
- Jib/genoa area: 474 sq ft (44.0 m^{2})
- Other sails: genoa: 775 sq ft (72.0 m^{2}) solent: 570 sq ft (53 m^{2}); Code 0: 1,044 sq ft (97.0 m^{2})
- Upwind sail area: 1,432 sq ft (133.0 m^{2})
- Downwind sail area: 1,701 sq ft (158.0 m^{2})

Rating
- PHRF: 54

The Sun Odyssey 509 is a French sailboat that was designed by Philippe Briand as a cruiser and first built in 2011.

The boat was marketed for the yacht charter trade as the Sunsail 51 and was developed into the Sun Odyssey 519 in 2015.

== Production ==
The design was built by Jeanneau in France, from 2011 to 2015, but it is now out of production.

== Design ==
The Sun Odyssey 509 is a recreational keelboat, built predominantly of fiberglass, with wood trim. The hull is made from solid hand-laid fiberglass with an interior structural grid and an injection-molded deck with a balsa core. It has a fractional sloop rig, with a deck-stepped mast, two sets of swept spreaders and aluminum spars with discontinuous 1X19 stainless steel wire rigging. An in-mast furling mainsail was a factory option. The hull has a plumb stem, a nearly-plumb transom with a motorized drop-down tailgate swimming platform, an internally mounted spade-type rudder controlled by dual wheels and a fixed L-shaped fin keel with a weighted bulb, or optional shoal-draft keel. The fin keel model displaces 30,644 lb (13,900 kg) empty and carries 9,480 lb (4,300 kg) of cast iron ballast, while the shoal keel version displaces 31,636 lb (14,350 kg) empty and carries 10,472 lb (4,750 kg) of cast iron ballast. The cockpit features a drop-leaf table.

The boat has a draft of 7.48 ft (2.28 m) with the standard keel and 5.68 ft (1.73 m) with the optional shoal draft keel.

The boat is fitted with a Japanese Yanmar diesel engine of 75 hp (56 kW) powering a saildrive, for docking and maneuvering. The fuel tank holds 63 U.S. gallons (240 L; 52 imp gal) and the fresh water tank has a capacity of 163 U.S. gallons (620 L; 136 imp gal).

The design has sleeping accommodation for six to nine people in three, four and five cabin layouts. The three cabin interior has with a double island berth in the bow "owners" cabin, a U-shaped settee and a straight settee in the main cabin and two aft cabins, each with a double berth. The forward cabin may be divides into two cabins, each with a "V"-berth. A single crew cabin may also be added aft, on the starboard side. The galley is located on the starboard side, just forward of the companionway ladder. The galley is a modified "L"-shape and is equipped with a two-burner stove, refrigerator, freezer and a double sink. A navigation station is opposite the galley, on the port side. There are two heads, one in the bow cabin on the port side and one on the port side, aft. Additional heads may be fitted fore and aft in the three and four cabin arrangements. When fitted, the crew cabin displaces a possible fourth head, though. There is a sail locker and a large anchor well in the forepeak. Cabin maximum headroom is 78 in (198 cm).

For sailing downwind the design may be equipped with a code 0 sail of 1,044 sq ft (97.0 m^{2}).

The design has a hull speed of 9.06 kn (16.78 km/h) and a PHRF handicap of 54.

== Operational history ==
In a 2012 Sail Magazine review, Charkes J. Doane wrote, "the interior feature I liked best on our test boat was the large, well-thought-out galley situated aft to starboard. The sinks are planted close to the centerline, right where they belong, and there is scads of stowage, with nine different compartments within easy reach of the cook. Best of all, there’s a so-called “tea galley” just forward of the sinks with a dedicated front-opening drinks fridge and a large cutlery drawer oriented toward the saloon's dinette table."

In a 2012 review for boats.com, Zuzana Prochazka wrote, "a few things which are less than ideal include the sheet winches that are shared between the genoa sheets and the double-ended mainsheet. There’s no room to add a set of secondary winches, which would come in handy. Also, the single backstay means the driver needs to duck when switching from one helm to the other, and it gets in the way when stepping on or off the swim platform. Also, the lifelines are just low enough to trip tall people and potentially send them overboard. Jeanneau is not the only builder to go the way of low lifelines. Dufour, Hanse and Beneteau do it as well and although I understand the aesthetic appeal, it’s not a good trend for safety."

In a 2013, Herb McCormick wrote at review for Cruising World, "the entire cockpit layout is pretty nifty, especially the steering pedestals, which double as curved seatbacks for the cockpit benches. My only quibble here is that the double-ended mainsheet and jib sheets share the respective primary winches just forward of the wheels (coupled with dedicated rope clutches). You need to be extremely quick and dexterous when handling the lines in a windy jibe. OK, one other thing peeved me: the hollow leech on the in-mast furling main (which is an option). Why in the world, I wondered, would you saddle a beautiful, slippery, state-of-the-art Briand hull with an inefficient power plant? I know the supposed reason—ease of handling—but I don't necessarily buy it, especially in this age of electric halyard winches."

== See also ==
- List of sailing boat types
