= Sun Rise 34 =

Sailboat class

Development
- Designer: Jacques Fauroux
- Location: France
- Year: 1984
- No. built: 629
- Builder: Jeanneau
- Role: Cruiser
- Name: Sun Rise 34

Boat
- Displacement: 10,361 lb (4,700 kg)
- Draft: 5.90 ft (1.80 m)

Hull
- Type: monohull
- Construction: fiberglass
- LOA: 34.58 ft (10.54 m)
- LWL: 29.50 ft (8.99 m)
- Beam: 11.45 ft (3.49 m)
- Engine: Yanmar 2GM20F diesel engine

Hull appendages
- Keel: fin keel
- Ballast: 3,460 lb (1,569 kg)
- Rudder: skeg-mounted rudder

Rig
- Rig type: Bermuda rig
- I foretriangle height: 43.00 ft (13.11 m)
- J foretriangle base: 13.80 ft (4.21 m)
- P mainsail luff: 38.10 ft (11.61 m)
- E mainsail foot: 11.50 ft (3.51 m)

Sails
- Sailplan: masthead sloop
- Mainsail area: 244 sq ft (22.7 m^{2})
- Jib/genoa area: 196 sq ft (18.2 m^{2})
- Spinnaker area: 959 sq ft (89.1 m^{2})
- Other sails: genoa: 454 sq ft (42.2 m^{2}) solent: 298 sq ft (27.7 m^{2})
- Upwind sail area: 699 sq ft (64.9 m^{2})
- Downwind sail area: 1,203 sq ft (111.8 m^{2})

The Sun Rise 34, sometimes just called the Sun Rise, is a French sailboat that was designed by Jacques Fauroux as a cruiser and first built in 1984.

== Production ==
The design was built by Jeanneau in France, from 1984 until 1989, with 629 boats built.

== Design ==
The Sun Rise 34 is a recreational keelboat, built predominantly of polyester fiberglass, with wood trim. It has a masthead sloop rig, with a deck-stepped mast, two sets of unswept spreaders and aluminum spars with 1X19 stainless steel wire rigging. The hull has a raked stem, a reverse transom, a skeg-mounted rudder controlled by a tiller with an extension and a fixed fin keel or optional stub keel and centerboard. The fin keel model displaces 10,361 lb (4,700 kg) and carries 3,460 lb (1,569 kg) of cast iron ballast, while the centerboard version displaces 11,244 lb (5,100 kg) and carries 4,277 lb (1,940 kg) of cast iron exterior ballast, with a steel centerboard.

The keel-equipped version of the boat has a draft of 5.90 ft (1.80 m), while the centerboard-equipped version has a draft of 7.00 ft (2.13 m) with the centerboard extended and 3.60 ft (1.10 m) with it retracted, allowing operation in shallow water.

The boat is fitted with a Japanese Yanmar 2GM20F diesel engine for docking and maneuvering. The fuel tank holds 18 U.S. gallons (68 L; 15 imp gal) and the fresh water tank has a capacity of 30 U.S. gallons (110 L; 25 imp gal).

The boat was built with two interiors: "team" and "owners". The team version has sleeping accommodation for eight people, with a double "V"-berth in the bow cabin, an L-shaped settee and a straight settee in the main cabin and two aft cabins with double berths. The galley is located on the port side just forward of the companionway ladder. The galley is L-shaped and is equipped with a two-burner stove, an ice box and a double sink. A navigation station is opposite the galley, on the starboard side. The head is located just aft of the navigation station on the starboard side. Cabin maximum headroom is 74 in (188 cm).

The "owners" model has sleeping accommodation for six people, with a double "V"-berth in the bow cabin, an L-shaped settee and a straight settee in the main cabin and an aft cabin with a double berth on the starboard side. The galley is located on the starboard side just forward of the companionway ladder. The galley is L-shaped and is equipped with a two-burner stove, an ice box and a double sink. A navigation station is opposite the galley, on the port side. The head is located just aft of the navigation station on the port side and includes a shower. There is also a sink in the aft cabin.

For sailing downwind the design may be equipped with a symmetrical spinnaker of 959 sq ft (89.1 m^{2}).

The design has a hull speed of 7.10 kn (13.15 km/h).

== See also ==
- List of sailing boat types
