= Sun Odyssey 419 =

Sailboat class

Development
- Designer: Philippe Briand; Jeanneau Design Office
- Location: France
- Year: 2015
- No. built: about 300
- Builder: Jeanneau
- Role: Cruiser
- Name: Sun Odyssey 419

Boat
- Displacement: 17,328 lb (7,860 kg)
- Draft: 6.89 ft (2.10 m)

Hull
- Type: monohull
- Construction: fiberglass
- LOA: 41.83 ft (12.75 m)
- LWL: 36.09 ft (11.00 m)
- Beam: 13.09 ft (3.99 m)
- Engine: Yanmar 4JH45 45 hp (34 kW) diesel engine

Hull appendages
- Keel: fin keel with weighted bulb
- Ballast: 4,982 lb (2,260 kg)
- Rudder: spade-type rudder

Rig
- Rig type: Bermuda rig
- I foretriangle height: 50.85 ft (15.50 m)
- J foretriangle base: 14.83 ft (4.52 m)
- P mainsail luff: 49.21 ft (15.00 m)
- E mainsail foot: 16.08 ft (4.90 m)

Sails
- Sailplan: 9/10 fractional rigged sloop
- Mainsail area: 468 sq ft (43.5 m^{2})
- Jib/genoa area: 304 sq ft (28.2 m^{2})
- Spinnaker area: 1,270 sq ft (118 m^{2})
- Gennaker area: 1,173 sq ft (109.0 m^{2})
- Other sails: genoa: 496 sq ft (46.1 m^{2}) solent: 350 sq ft (33 m^{2}) code 0: 753 sq ft (70.0 m^{2})
- Upwind sail area: 964 sq ft (89.6 m^{2})
- Downwind sail area: 1,738 sq ft (161.5 m^{2})

The Sun Odyssey 419 is a French sailboat that was designed by Philippe Briand and the Jeanneau Design Office as a cruiser and first built in 2015.

The boat is a development of the Sun Odyssey 409, which it replaced in production. Compared to the 409, the 419 has a wider swimming platform and a bowsprit.

== Production ==
The design was built by Jeanneau in France, from 2015 to 2019, with about 300 completed, but it is now out of production.

== Design ==
The Sun Odyssey 419 is a recreational keelboat, built predominantly of polyester fiberglass, with wood trim. It has a fractional sloop rig with a bowsprit, with a deck-stepped mast, two sets of swept spreaders and aluminum spars with 1X19 stainless steel wire rigging. The hard-chined hull has a raked stem, a reverse transom with a drop-down tailgate swimming platform, an internally mounted spade-type rudder controlled by dual wheels and a fixed L-shaped fin keel with a weighted bulb or optional shoal-draft keel. The fin keel model displaces 17,328 lb (7,860 kg) empty and carries 4,982 lb (2,260 kg) of cast iron ballast, while the shoal draft version displaces 17,791 lb (8,070 kg) and carries 5,445 lb (2,470 kg) of cast iron ballast.

The boat has a draft of 6.89 ft (2.10 m) with the standard keel and 5.09 ft (1.55 m) with the optional shoal draft keel.

The boat is fitted with a Japanese Yanmar 4JH45 diesel engine of 45 hp (34 kW), with a saildrive, for docking and maneuvering. The fuel tank holds 53 U.S. gallons (200 L; 44 imp gal) and the fresh water tank has a capacity of 87 U.S. gallons (330 L; 72 imp gal).

The design was built with two and three cabin interiors, with sleeping accommodation for four to six people. The two cabin arrangement has a double "V"-berth in the bow cabin, a U-shaped settee and a straight settee in the main cabin and an aft cabin with a double berth on the starboard side. The three cabin version adds a second aft cabin on the port side. The galley is located on the starboard side just forward of the companionway ladder. The galley is L-shaped and is equipped with a two-burner stove, an ice box and a double sink. The head is located just aft of the polyester on the port side and includes a shower. A second head mahy be installed on the starboard side inside the bow cabin. Cabin maximum headroom is 77 in (196 cm).

For sailing downwind the design may be equipped with a symmetrical spinnaker of 1,270 sq ft (118 m^{2}), an asymmetrical spinnaker of 1,173 sq ft (109.0 m^{2}) or a code 0 sail of 753 sq ft (70.0 m^{2}).

The design has a hull speed of 8.05 kn (14.91 km/h).

== Operational history ==
In a 2016 review for boats.com, Diego Yriarte wrote, "it is true that the hull lines, particularly the hard chine, make you think this is a racing boat, even more so when considering the addition of the bowsprit, but the true calling of the Sun Odyssey 419 is comfortable, fast cruising. Nevertheless, there’s no reason you couldn’t enter your 419 in a local regatta and enjoy a lap around the racecourse."

== See also ==
- List of sailing boat types
