= Sangria 25 =

Sailboat class

Development
- Designer: Philippe Harlé
- Location: France
- Year: 1969
- No. built: 2,336
- Builders: Jeanneau; Gibert Marine
- Role: Cruiser-Racer
- Name: Sangria 25

Boat
- Displacement: 3,968 lb (1,800 kg)
- Draft: 4.10 ft (1.25 m)

Hull
- Type: monohull
- Construction: fiberglass
- LOA: 25.00 ft (7.62 m)
- LWL: 19.03 ft (5.80 m)
- Beam: 8.86 ft (2.70 m)
- Engine: diesel inboard engine

Hull appendages
- Keel: fin keel
- Ballast: 1,653 lb (750 kg)
- Rudder: skeg-mounted rudder

Rig
- Rig type: Bermuda rig
- I foretriangle height: 30.02 ft (9.15 m)
- J foretriangle base: 9.19 ft (2.80 m)
- P mainsail luff: 25.26 ft (7.70 m)
- E mainsail foot: 9.22 ft (2.81 m)

Sails
- Sailplan: masthead sloop
- Mainsail area: 135 sq ft (12.5 m^{2})
- Jib/genoa area: 108 sq ft (10.0 m^{2})
- Spinnaker area: 436 sq ft (40.5 m^{2})
- Other sails: Genoa: 205 sq ft (19.0 m^{2}); Solent : 161 sq ft (15.0 m^{2}); Storm jib : 54 sq ft (5.0 m^{2})

The Sangria 25 is a French sailboat that was designed by Philippe Harlé as a cruiser-racer and first built in 1969.

The design is one of the most successful sailboat models of its size built in Europe, with 2,336 boats completed.

== Production ==
The design was built by Jeanneau and Gibert Marine in France from 1969 until 1982, but it is now out of production. A total of 2,150 standard models were built plus 186 of the GTE model.

== Design ==
The Sangria 25 is a recreational keelboat, built predominantly of single skin fiberglass polyester, with wooden trim. It has a masthead sloop rig, with a deck-stepped mast, one set of spreaders and aluminum spars with stainless steel wire rigging. The hull has a raked stem, a plumb transom, a skeg-mounted rudder controlled by a tiller and a fixed fin keel or deep draft keel in the GTE model. It displaces 3,968 lb (1,800 kg) and carries 1,653 lb (750 kg) of ballast.

The standard model boat has a draft of 4.10 ft (1.25 m), while the deep draft GTE model has a draft of 4.92 ft (1.50 m).

The boat is fitted with a diesel inboard engine of 8 hp (6 kW) for docking and maneuvering. The fuel tank holds 7.4 U.S. gallons (28 L; 6.2 imp gal) and the fresh water tank has a capacity of 13.2 U.S. gallons (50 L; 11.0 imp gal).

The design has sleeping accommodation for four people, with a double "V"-berth in the bow cabin and two straight settee berths in the main cabin. The galley is located on the starboard side just forward of the companionway ladder. The galley is equipped with a two-burner stove, ice box and a small sink. The head is located just aft of the bow cabin on the port side. The maximum cabin headroom is 71 in (180 cm) at the galley, the main cabin headroom is 67 in (170 cm) and the bow cabin headroom is 55 in (140 cm).

For sailing downwind the boat may be equipped with a symmetrical spinnaker of 436 sq ft (40.5 m^{2}).

The design has a hull speed of 5.85 kn (10.83 km/h).

== Operational history ==
The boat is supported by an active class club, Les Amis du Sangria et l'Aquila.

== See also ==
- List of sailing boat types
