= Sun Odyssey 39i =

Sailboat class

Development
- Designer: Marc Lombard
- Location: France
- Year: 2005
- No. built: over 1,000
- Builder: Jeanneau
- Role: Cruiser
- Name: Sun Odyssey 39i

Boat
- Displacement: 16,160 lb (7,330 kg)
- Draft: 6.56 ft (2.00 m)

Hull
- Type: monohull
- Construction: fiberglass
- LOA: 38.91 ft (11.86 m)
- LWL: 35.15 ft (10.71 m)
- Beam: 12.73 ft (3.88 m)
- Engine: Yanmar 40 hp (30 kW) diesel engine

Hull appendages
- Keel: fin keel with weighted bulb
- Ballast: 5,026 lb (2,280 kg)
- Rudder: spade-type rudder

Rig
- Rig type: Bermuda rig
- I foretriangle height: 48.06 ft (14.65 m)
- J foretriangle base: 13.81 ft (4.21 m)
- P mainsail luff: 46.26 ft (14.10 m)
- E mainsail foot: 14.60 ft (4.45 m)

Sails
- Sailplan: fractional rigged sloop
- Mainsail area: 337.70 sq ft (31.373 m^{2})
- Jib/genoa area: 331.85 sq ft (30.830 m^{2})
- Spinnaker area: 1,044 sq ft (97.0 m^{2})
- Total sail area: 669.55 sq ft (62.203 m^{2})

Racing
- PHRF: PTE: 141, Performance: 120-129

The Sun Odyssey 39i is a French sailboat that was designed by Marc Lombard as a cruiser and first built in 2005.

The "i" in the designation indicates that the deck is injection-molded.

== Production ==
The design was built by Jeanneau in France, from 2005 to 2010, with more than 1,000 built, but it is now out of production.

The boat was replaced in production by the Sun Odyssey 409.

== Design ==
The Sun Odyssey 39i is a recreational keelboat, built predominantly of fiberglass, with wood trim. It has a fractional sloop rig, a nearly-plumb stem, a reverse transom with steps and a swimming platform, an internally mounted spade-type rudder controlled by dual wheels and a fixed fin keel with a weighted bulb on the GTE model, an optional shoal-draft keel on the PTE model or a deep-draft keel on the "Performance" model. There is a dedicated life raft locker in the stern skirt. The boat displaces 16,160 lb (7,330 kg) and carries 5,026 lb (2,280 kg) of ballast on the GTE, 5,401 lb (2,450 kg) on the PTE and 4,636 lb (2,103 kg) of ballast on the Performance model.

The GTE model has a draft of 6.56 ft (2.00 m), the PTE has a draft of 4.92 ft (1.50 m) and the Performance model has a draft of 7.25 ft (2.21 m).

The boat is fitted with a Japanese Yanmar diesel engine of 40 hp (30 kW) for docking and maneuvering. The fuel tank holds 34 U.S. gallons (130 L; 28 imp gal) and the fresh water tank has a capacity of 94 U.S. gallons (360 L; 78 imp gal).

The design has sleeping accommodation for four to six people, in two and three-cabin layouts, respectively. In the two-cabin version there is a double "V"-berth in the bow cabin, a U-shaped settee and a straight settee in the main cabin and an aft cabin with a double berth on the starboard side. A third cabin is added by dividing the aft cabin into two cabins. The galley is located on the starboard side just forward of the companionway ladder. The galley is L-shaped and is equipped with a three-burner stove, an ice box and a double sink. A navigation station is opposite the galley, on the port side. The head is located just aft of the bow cabin on the port side and includes a separate shower. On the three cabin model the head is smaller and the shower is not separate.

For sailing downwind the design may be equipped with a symmetrical spinnaker of 1,044 sq ft (97.0 m^{2}).

The design has a hull speed of 7.94 kn (14.70 km/h) and a PHRF handicap of 120 to 129 for the Performance version and 141 for the shoal draft PTE version.

== Operational history ==
In a 2007 review for Cruising World, Andrew Burton wrote, "the Jeanneau Sun Odyssey 39i shares many of the qualities of the 39 DS. Thanks to a generous beam carried well aft, interior volume is greater than one would expect on a 39-footer. The boat's a breeze to operate under sail or power: The helm is light, and the boat responds obediently to a flick of the fingers on the wheel."

== See also ==
- List of sailing boat types
