= Sun Odyssey 42.2 =

Sailboat class

Development
- Designer: Guy Ribadeau Dumas
- Location: France
- Year: 1995
- Builder: Jeanneau
- Role: Cruiser
- Name: Sun Odyssey 42.2

Boat
- Displacement: 18,519 lb (8,400 kg)
- Draft: 6.56 ft (2.00 m)

Hull
- Type: monohull
- Construction: fiberglass
- LOA: 41.99 ft (12.80 m)
- LWL: 33.30 ft (10.15 m)
- Beam: 13.45 ft (4.10 m)
- Engine: 50 hp (37 kW) diesel engine

Hull appendages
- Keel: fin keel
- Ballast: 5,754 lb (2,610 kg)
- Rudder: spade-type rudder

Rig
- Rig type: Bermuda rig
- I foretriangle height: 50.85 ft (15.50 m)
- J foretriangle base: 13.78 ft (4.20 m)
- P mainsail luff: 45.60 ft (13.90 m)
- E mainsail foot: 15.42 ft (4.70 m)

Sails
- Sailplan: masthead sloop
- Mainsail area: 351.58 sq ft (32.663 m^{2})
- Jib/genoa area: 350.36 sq ft (32.550 m^{2})
- Total sail area: 701.93 sq ft (65.211 m^{2})

The Sun Odyssey 42.2 is a French sailboat that was designed by Guy Ribadeau Dumas as an offshore cruiser and first built in 1995.

The boat is one of a series of designs with similar names and intended markets, including the 1990 Sun Odyssey 42, 1992 Sun Odyssey 42.1, the 1996 Sun Odyssey 42 CC, the 2005 Sun Odyssey 42i and the 2007 Sun Odyssey 42 DS.

The Sun Odyssey 42.2 is derived from the Voyage 12.5 and uses the same hull design as the Sun Odyssey 42 CC.

== Production ==
The design was built by Jeanneau in France, from 1995 until 2000, but it is now out of production.

== Design ==
The Sun Odyssey 42.2 is a recreational keelboat, built predominantly of fiberglass, with wood trim. It has a masthead sloop rig, a raked stem, a reverse transom with steps to a swim platform, an internally mounted spade-type rudder controlled by a wheel and a fixed fin keel or optional shoal-draft keel. It displaces 18,519 lb (8,400 kg) and carries 5,754 lb (2,610 kg) of ballast in the fin keel model and 6,283 lb (2,850 kg) of ballast in the shaol draft keel model.

The boat has a draft of 6.56 ft (2.00 m) with the standard keel and 5.4 ft (1.6 m) with the optional shoal draft keel.

The boat is fitted with a diesel engine of 50 hp (37 kW) for docking and maneuvering. A 60 hp (45 kW) engine was a factory option. The fuel tank holds 46 U.S. gallons (170 L; 38 imp gal) and the fresh water tank has a capacity of 116 U.S. gallons (440 L; 97 imp gal).

The design was built in both three and four cabins version. The three cabin model has sleeping accommodation for six people, with a double "V"-berth in the bow cabin, two L-shaped settees in the main cabin and two aft cabins, both with double berths. The galley is located on the port side amidships. The galley is a straight layout and is equipped with a four-burner stove, an ice box and a double sink. A navigation station is aft of the galley, on the port side. There are two heads, one just aft of the bow cabin on the port side and one on the starboard side just forward of the starboard aft cabin. The four cabin layout adds a small cabin forward in place of starboard head and the head is relocated to the port side.

The design has a hull speed of 7.73 kn (14.32 km/h).

== See also ==
- List of sailing boat types
