= Sun Odyssey 439 =

Sailboat class

Development
- Designer: Philippe Briand
- Location: France
- Year: 2011
- Builder: Jeanneau
- Role: Cruiser
- Name: Sun Odyssey 439

Boat
- Displacement: 21,253 lb (9,640 kg)
- Draft: 7.22 ft (2.20 m)

Hull
- Type: monohull
- Construction: fiberglass
- LOA: 43.77 ft (13.34 m)
- LWL: 39.37 ft (12.00 m)
- Beam: 13.91 ft (4.24 m)
- Engine: Yanmar 4JH5-CE 54 hp (40 kW) diesel engine

Hull appendages
- Keel: fin keel with weighted bulb
- Ballast: 6,283 lb (2,850 kg)
- Rudder: spade-type rudder

Rig
- Rig type: Bermuda rig
- I foretriangle height: 54.46 ft (16.60 m)
- J foretriangle base: 17.09 ft (5.21 m)
- P mainsail luff: 52.49 ft (16.00 m)
- E mainsail foot: 17.22 ft (5.25 m)

Sails
- Sailplan: fractional rigged sloop
- Mainsail area: 533 sq ft (49.5 m^{2})
- Jib/genoa area: 380 sq ft (35 m^{2})
- Spinnaker area: 1,550 sq ft (144 m^{2})
- Gennaker area: 1,432 sq ft (133.0 m^{2})
- Other sails: genoa: 589 sq ft (54.7 m^{2}) solent: 447 sq ft (41.5 m^{2}); Code 0: 822 sq ft (76.4 m^{2})
- Upwind sail area: 1,122 sq ft (104.2 m^{2})
- Downwind sail area: 2,083 sq ft (193.5 m^{2})

The Sun Odyssey 439 is a French sailboat that was designed by Philippe Briand as a cruiser and first built in 2011.

The boat shares a hull design with the Sun Odyssey 44 DS and was developed into the Sun Odyssey 449 in 2015.

== Production ==
The design was built by Jeanneau in France, from 2011 to 2015, but it is now out of production.

== Design ==
The Sun Odyssey 439 is a recreational keelboat, built predominantly of polyester fiberglass, with wood trim. The hard-chine hull is solid fiberglass, while the deck as a balsa core. It has a fractional sloop rig, with a deck-stepped mast, two sets of swept spreaders and aluminum spars with 1X19 stainless steel wire rigging. The hull has a plumb stem, a reverse transom with a drop-down tailgate, an internally mounted spade-type rudder controlled by dual wheels and a fixed L-shaped fin keel with a weighted bulb or optional shoal-draft keel.

The fin keel model displaces 21,253 lb (9,640 kg) empty and carries 6,283 lb (2,850 kg) of cast iron ballast, while the shoal draft version displaces 21,914 lb (9,940 kg) empty and carries 6,945 lb (3,150 kg) of ballast.

The boat has a draft of 7.22 ft (2.20 m) with the standard keel and 5.25 ft (1.60 m) with the optional shoal draft keel.

The boat is fitted with a Japanese Yanmar 4JH5-CE diesel engine of 54 hp (40 kW) for docking and maneuvering. The fuel tank holds 53 U.S. gallons (200 L; 44 imp gal) and the fresh water tank has a capacity of 87 U.S. gallons (330 L; 72 imp gal).

The design has sleeping accommodation for four to seven people, with a double "V"-berth in the bow cabin, a second single cabin on the port side, a U-shaped settee and a straight settee in the main cabin and two aft cabins, each with a double berth. The smaller forward cabin may be omitted and the larger bow cabin then fitted with a double island berth. The port aft cabin may also be omitted, giving a larger aft starboard cabin. The galley is located on the port side just forward of the companionway ladder. The galley is L-shaped and is equipped with a two-burner stove, an ice box and a double sink. There are two heads, one just aft of the bow cabin on the starboard side and one on the port side, aft. Cabin maximum headroom is 78 in (198 cm).

For sailing downwind the design may be equipped with a symmetrical spinnaker of 1,550 sq ft (144 m^{2}), an asymmetrical spinnaker of 1,432 sq ft (133.0 m^{2}) or a code 0 of 822 sq ft (76.4 m^{2}).

The design has a hull speed of 8.41 kn (15.58 km/h).

== Operational history ==
In a 2012 review for Sail Magazine, Adam Cort concluded, "the latest iteration of the Sun Odyssey program is predicated on an approach that emphasizes speed, accommodations and a sailor-friendly rig and deck layout. All three elements are very much in evidence aboard the Sun Odyssey 439."

In a 2013 Cruising World review, Alvah Simon wrote, "the wind gods of the Chesapeake favored us with 10-18 knots of breeze on our test day. We easily managed 7 knots respectably close to the wind, and hit the polar predictions on all other points of sail. Partially due to the in-mast furling system, I felt the gooseneck was inordinately high above the waterline. This not only reduces the mainsail area but also raises the center of effort, both detracting from the overall sailing performance. This may account for the excess weather helm we experienced. I believe the traditional slab-reefing mainsail option is more congruent with the 439’s performance persona."

== See also ==
- List of sailing boat types
