= Sun Odyssey 440 =

Sailboat class

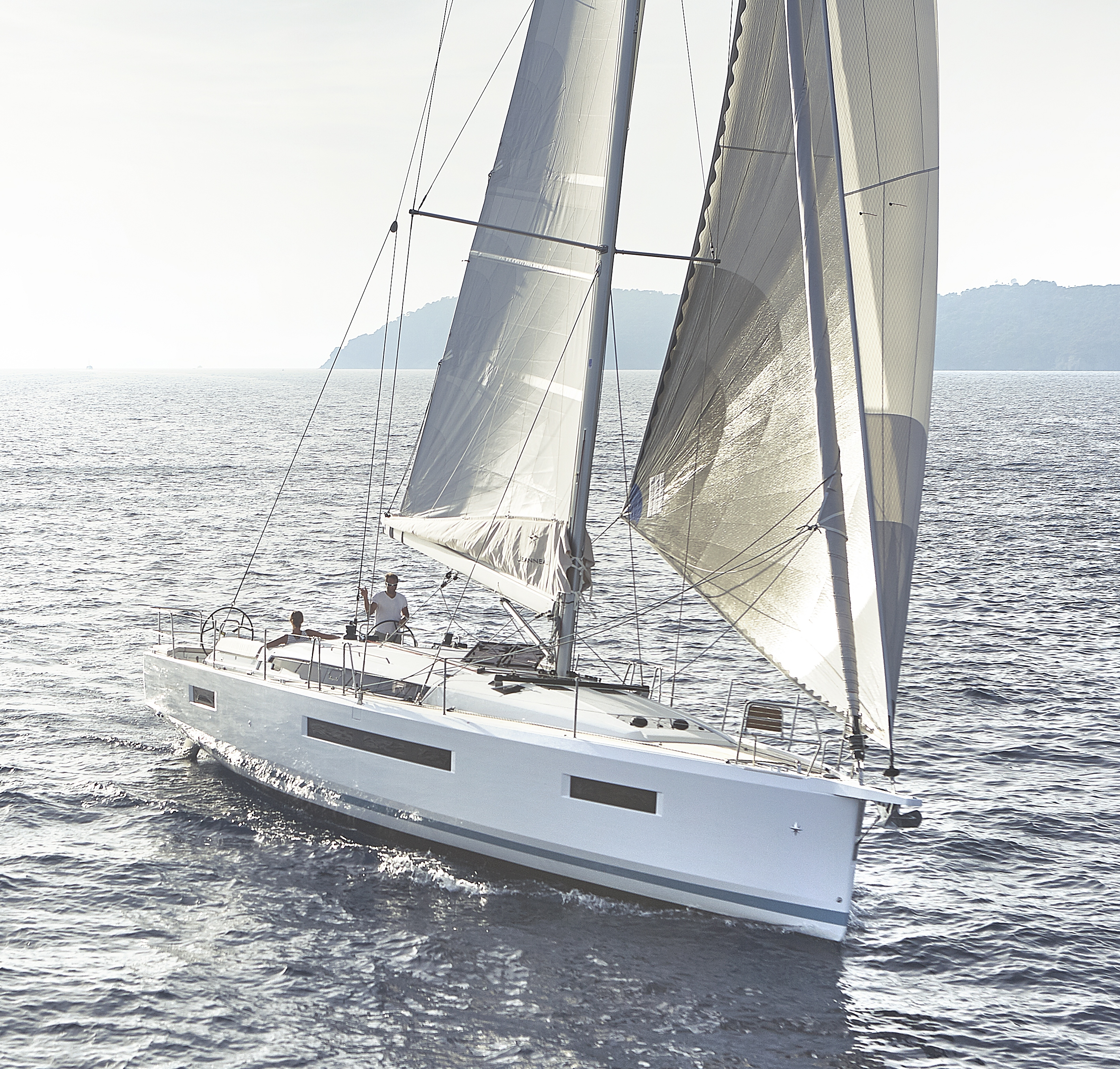

Development
- Designer: Philippe Briand; Piaton Bonet Yacht Design; Jeanneau Design Office
- Location: France
- Year: 2017
- Builder: Jeanneau
- Role: Cruiser
- Name: Sun Odyssey 440

Boat
- Displacement: 18,874 lb (8,561 kg)
- Draft: 7.22 ft (2.20 m)

Hull
- Type: monohull
- Construction: fiberglass
- LOA: 43.92 ft (13.39 m) including bowsprit
- LWL: 39.37 ft (12.00 m)
- Beam: 14.07 ft (4.29 m)
- Engine: Inboard diesel engine 45 or 57 hp (34 or 43 kW)

Hull appendages
- Keel: fin keel
- Ballast: 5,026 lb (2,280 kg)
- Rudder: dual internally-mounted spade-type rudders

Rig
- Rig type: Bermuda rig
- I foretriangle height: 50.20 ft (15.30 m)
- J foretriangle base: 16.96 ft (5.17 m)
- P mainsail luff: 50.20 ft (15.30 m)
- E mainsail foot: 16.57 ft (5.05 m)

Sails
- Sailplan: 9/10 fractional rigged sloop
- Mainsail area: 486 sq ft (45.2 m^{2})
- Jib/genoa area: 486 sq ft (45.2 m^{2})
- Other sails: Code O: 881 sq ft (81.8 m^{2}) solent: 325 sq ft (30.2 m^{2})
- Upwind sail area: 972 sq ft (90.3 m^{2})
- Downwind sail area: 1,367 sq ft (127.0 m^{2})

The Sun Odyssey 440 is a French sailboat that was designed by Philippe Briand, Piaton Bonet Yacht Design and the Jeanneau Design Office as a cruiser and first built in 2017.

== Production ==
The design has been built by Jeanneau in France, since 2017 and remains in production.

== Design ==
The Sun Odyssey 440 is a recreational keelboat, built predominantly of polyester fiberglass. The hull is solid fiberglass and the deck is an injection-molded sandwich. It has a 9/10 fractional sloop rig, with a deck-stepped mast, two sets of swept spreaders and aluminum spars with discontinuous stainless steel wire rigging, with the Performance version having Dyform rigging. The hull has a plumb stem with a fixed 1.27 ft (39 cm) bowsprit, a plumb transom, with a fold-down swimming platform, dual internally mounted spade-type rudders controlled by dual wheels and a fixed fin keel or optional shoal-draft keel. Both keels are L-shaped with a weighted bulb. The fin keel model displaces 18,874 lb (8,561 kg) and carries 5,027 lb (2,280 kg) of cast iron ballast, while the shoal draft version displaces 19,734 lb (8,951 kg) and carries 5,886 lb (2,670 kg) of cast iron ballast.

The boat has a draft of 7.22 ft (2.20 m) with the standard keel and 5.16 ft (1.57 m) with the optional shoal draft keel.

The Performance version has a taller mast and 9% greater sail area.

The boat is fitted with an inboard diesel engine of 45 or 57 hp (34 or 43 kW) for docking and maneuvering. The fuel tank holds 53 U.S. gallons (200 L; 44 imp gal) and the fresh water tank has a capacity of 87.2 U.S. gallons (330 L; 72.6 imp gal).

The design has sleeping accommodation for six people, with a double berth in the bow cabin, an U-shaped settee in the main cabin around a rectangular table and two aft cabins with double berth in each. The galley is located on the port side just forward of the companionway ladder. The galley is U-shaped and is equipped with a three-burner stove, an ice box and a double sink. A navigation station is aft of the galley, on the port side. There are two heads, one just aft of the bow cabin on the port side and one on the starboard side forward of the aft cabin. Cabin maximum headroom is 78 in (198 cm).

For reaching and sailing downwind the design may be equipped with an asymmetrical Code O sail of 881 sq ft (81.8 m^{2}).

The design has a hull speed of 8.41 kn (15.58 km/h).

== Operational history ==
In 2018 the design was named the Best Monohull Cruising Boat 41 to 50ft by SAIL magazine, the Cruising World Boat of the Year: Most Innovative and the Family Cruiser European Yacht of the Year.

The boat is supported by an active class club, the Jeanneau Owners Network.

In June 2024, the Sun Odyssey 440, along with the 410 and 490, was recalled due to faulty bow thrusters resulting in some cases of sinking.

== See also ==
- List of sailing boat types
