= Sun Odyssey 449 =

Sailboat class

Development
- Designer: Philippe Briand
- Location: France
- Year: 2015
- Builder: Jeanneau
- Role: Cruiser
- Name: Sun Odyssey 449

Boat
- Displacement: 21,253 lb (9,640 kg)
- Draft: 7.17 ft (2.19 m)

Hull
- Type: monohull
- Construction: fiberglass
- LOA: 45.08 ft (13.74 m) with bowsprit
- LWL: 39.33 ft (11.99 m)
- Beam: 13.83 ft (4.22 m)
- Engine: Yanmar 57 hp (43 kW) diesel engine

Hull appendages
- Keel: fin keel with weighted bulb
- Ballast: 6,283 lb (2,850 kg)
- Rudder: spade-type rudder

Rig
- Rig type: Bermuda rig
- I foretriangle height: 54.42 ft (16.59 m)
- J foretriangle base: 17.08 ft (5.21 m)
- P mainsail luff: 52.42 ft (15.98 m)
- E mainsail foot: 17.17 ft (5.23 m)

Sails
- Sailplan: fractional rigged sloop
- Mainsail area: 553 sq ft (51.4 m^{2})
- Jib/genoa area: 380 sq ft (35 m^{2})
- Spinnaker area: 1,550 sq ft (144 m^{2})
- Gennaker area: 1,432 sq ft (133.0 m^{2})
- Other sails: genoa: 589 sq ft (54.7 m^{2}) solent: 447 sq ft (41.5 m^{2}) code 0: 822 sq ft (76.4 m^{2})
- Upwind sail area: 1,122 sq ft (104.2 m^{2})
- Downwind sail area: 2,083 sq ft (193.5 m^{2})

The Sun Odyssey 449 is a French sailboat that was designed by Philippe Briand as a cruiser and first built in 2015.

The design is a development of the Sun Odyssey 439 with a wider swimming platform and a bowsprit.

== Production ==
The design was built by Jeanneau in France, from 2015 to 2019, but it is now out of production.

== Design ==
The Sun Odyssey 449 is a recreational keelboat, built predominantly of polyester fiberglass, with wood trim. It has a fractional sloop rig, with a deck-stepped mast, two sets of swept spreaders and aluminum spars with 1X19 stainless steel wire rigging. The hull has a plumb stem, a reverse transom with a drop-down tailgate swimming platform, an internally mounted spade-type rudder controlled by dual wheels and a fixed L-shaped fin keel with a weighted bulb or optional shoal-draft keel. The fin keel model displaces 21,253 lb (9,640 kg) empty and carries 6,283 lb (2,850 kg) of cast iron ballast, while the shoal draft version displaces 21,914 lb (9,940 kg) and carries 6,945 lb (3,150 kg) of cast iron ballast.

The boat has a draft of 7.17 ft (2.19 m) with the standard keel and 5.17 ft (1.58 m) with the optional shoal draft keel.

The boat is fitted with a Japanese Yanmar diesel engine of 57 hp (43 kW) for docking and maneuvering. The fuel tank holds 53 U.S. gallons (200 L; 44 imp gal) and the fresh water tank has a capacity of 87 U.S. gallons (330 L; 72 imp gal).

The design has sleeping accommodation for six to eight people, with a double island berth in the bow cabin, a U-shaped settee and a straight settee with a navigation station in the main cabin and two aft cabins, each with a double berth. Alternatively the bow cabin can be fitted wit a "V"-berth and a smaller cabin with two offset bunk beds may be installed just aft of the bow cabin, on the port side. The galley is located on the starboard side just forward of the companionway ladder. The galley is L-shaped and is equipped with a two-burner stove, an ice box and a double sink. There are two heads, one just aft of the bow cabin on the starboard side and one on the port side, aft, opposite the galley. Cabin maximum headroom is 78 in (198 cm).

For sailing downwind the design may be equipped with a symmetrical spinnaker of 1,550 sq ft (144 m^{2}), an asymmetrical spinnaker of 1,432 sq ft (133.0 m^{2}) or a code 0 of 822 sq ft (76.4 m^{2}).

The design has a hull speed of 8.41 kn (15.58 km/h).

== See also ==
- List of sailing boat types
