= Beneteau First 305 =

Sailboat class

First 305
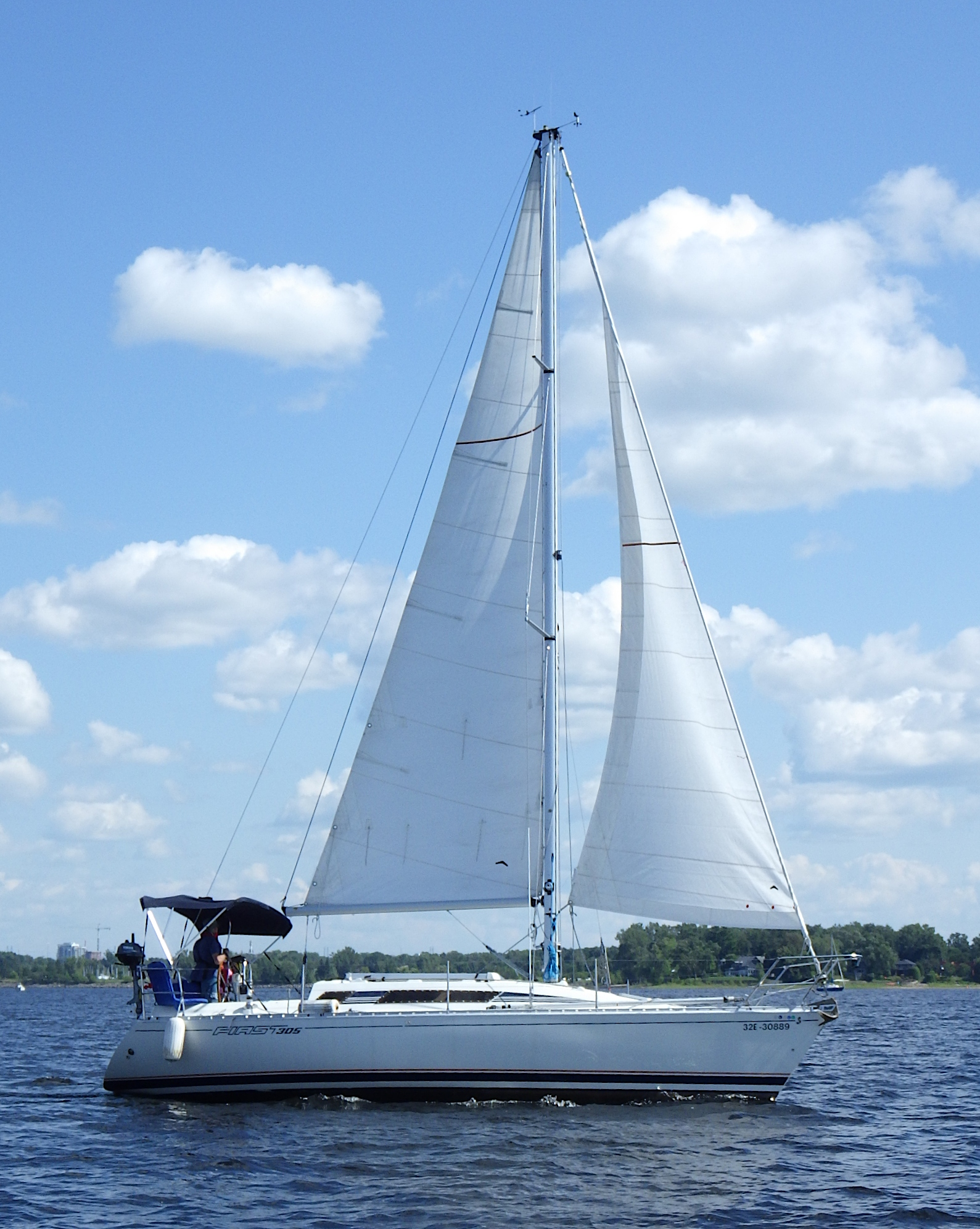

Development
- Designer: Jean Berret
- Location: France
- Year: 1984
- No. built: 644
- Builder: Beneteau
- Role: Cruiser-Racer
- Name: First 305

Boat
- Displacement: 7,937 lb (3,600 kg)
- Draft: 5.58 ft (1.70 m)

Hull
- Type: monohull
- Construction: glassfibre
- LOA: 30.50 ft (9.30 m)
- LWL: 26.75 ft (8.15 m)
- Beam: 10.50 ft (3.20 m)
- Engine: Volvo 2002 diesel engine

Hull appendages
- Keel: Fin keel
- Ballast: 2,976 lb (1,350 kg)
- Rudder: Spade-type rudder

Rig
- Rig type: Bermuda rig
- I foretriangle height: 39.33 ft (11.99 m)
- J foretriangle base: 11.38 ft (3.47 m)
- P mainsail luff: 33.58 ft (10.24 m)
- E mainsail foot: 11.08 ft (3.38 m)

Sails
- Sailplan: Masthead sloop
- Mainsail area: 199 sq ft (18.5 m^{2})
- Jib/genoa area: 137 sq ft (12.7 m^{2})
- Spinnaker area: 759 sq ft (70.5 m^{2})
- Other sails: genoa: 328 sq ft (30.5 m^{2}) solent: 264 sq ft (24.5 m^{2}) storm jib: 62 sq ft (5.8 m^{2})
- Upwind sail area: 527 sq ft (49.0 m^{2})
- Downwind sail area: 958 sq ft (89.0 m^{2})

Racing
- PHRF: 159

The Beneteau First 305 is a French sailboat that was designed by Jean Berret as a cruiser-racer and first built in 1984.

== Production ==
The design was built by Beneteau in France, and also in Marion, South Carolina, United States, starting in 1984 as a 1985 model year and was built until 1989, with 644 boats completed.

== Design ==
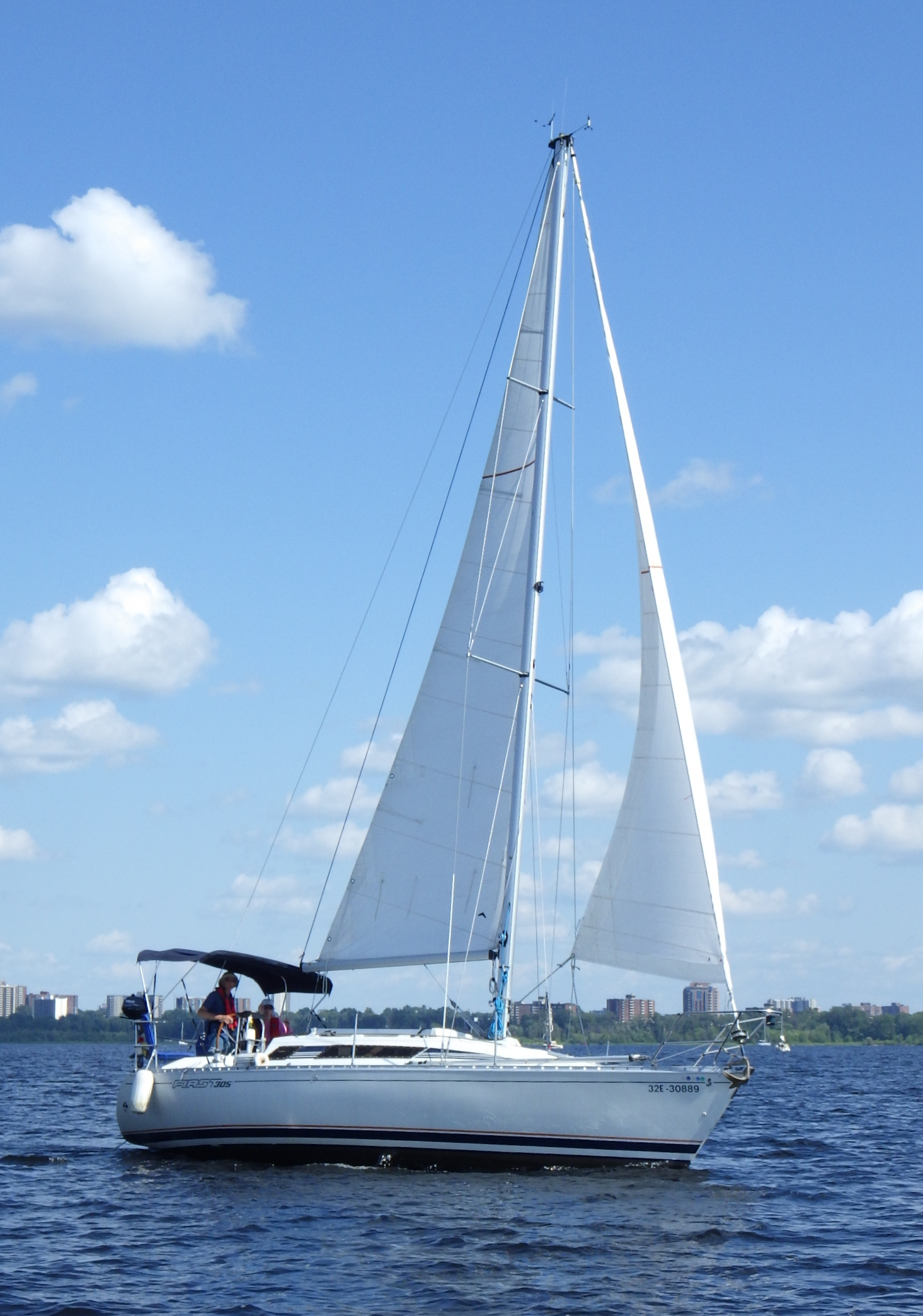
Beneteau First 305

The First 305 is a recreational keelboat, built predominantly of glassfibre, with wood trim. The hull is solid fibreglass and the deck is balsa-cored. It has a masthead sloop rig, with a deck-stepped mast, two sets of unswept spreaders and aluminium spars with continuous stainless steel wire standing rigging. The hull has a raked stem, a reverse transom, an internally mounted spade-type rudder controlled by a tiller and a fixed fin keel or optional shoal draft keel. It displaces 7,939 lb (3,601 kg) empty and carries 2,976 lb (1,350 kg) of cast iron ballast.

The boat has a draft of 5.58 ft (1.70 m) with the standard keel and 4.33 ft (1.32 m) with the optional shoal draft keel.

A version was also built with stub keel, daggerboard and twin rudders, for anchorages that dry out.

The boat is fitted with a Swedish Volvo 2002 diesel engine for docking and manoeuvring. The fuel tank holds 9 U.S. gallons (34 L; 7.5 imp gal) and the fresh water tank has a capacity of 30 U.S. gallons (110 L; 25 imp gal).

The design has sleeping accommodation for four people, with a double "V"-berth berth in the bow cabin, an L-shaped settee and a straight settee in the main salon and an aft cabin with a double berth on the port side. The galley is located on the port side just forward of the companionway ladder. The galley is L-shaped and is equipped with a two-burner stove, an ice box and a double sink. A navigation station is opposite the galley, on the starboard side. The head is located aft, on the starboard side and includes a shower. Cabin maximum headroom is 70 in (178 cm).

For sailing downwind the design may be equipped with a symmetrical spinnaker of 759 sq ft (70.5 m^{2}).

The design has a hull speed of 6.87 kn (12.72 km/h) and a PHRF handicap of 159.

== See also ==
- List of sailing boat types
