= Sun Odyssey 519 =

Sailboat class

Development
- Designer: Philippe Briand; Jeanneau Design Office
- Location: France
- Year: 2015
- Builder: Jeanneau
- Role: Cruiser
- Name: Sun Odyssey 519

Boat
- Displacement: 30,644 lb (13,900 kg)
- Draft: 7.42 ft (2.26 m)

Hull
- Type: monohull
- Construction: fiberglass
- LOA: 51.67 ft (15.75 m)
- LWL: 45.67 ft (13.92 m)
- Beam: 15.33 ft (4.67 m)
- Engine: Yanmar 80 hp (60 kW) diesel engine

Hull appendages
- Keel: fin keel with weighted bulb
- Ballast: 9,480 lb (4,300 kg)
- Rudder: spade-type rudder

Rig
- Rig type: Bermuda rig
- I foretriangle height: 62.50 ft (19.05 m)
- J foretriangle base: 18.92 ft (5.77 m)
- P mainsail luff: 57.33 ft (17.47 m)
- E mainsail foot: 19.67 ft (6.00 m)

Sails
- Sailplan: fractional rigged sloop
- Mainsail area: 657 sq ft (61.0 m^{2})
- Jib/genoa area: 474 sq ft (44.0 m^{2})
- Other sails: genoa: 775 sq ft (72.0 m^{2}) solent: 570 sq ft (53 m^{2}) code 0: 1,044 sq ft (97.0 m^{2})
- Upwind sail area: 1,432 sq ft (133.0 m^{2})
- Downwind sail area: 1,701 sq ft (158.0 m^{2})

The Sun Odyssey 519 is a French sailboat that was designed by Philippe Briand and the Jeanneau Design Office, as a cruiser and was first built in 2015.

The design is a development of the Sun Odyssey 509 with a wider swimming platform and a bowsprit.

== Production ==
The design was built by Jeanneau in France, from 2015 to 2019, but it is now out of production.

== Design ==
The Sun Odyssey 519 is a recreational keelboat, built predominantly of fiberglass, with wood trim. It has a fractional sloop rig, with a deck-stepped mast, two sets of swept spreaders and aluminum spars with 1X19 stainless steel wire rigging. The hull has a raked stem, a reverse transom with a drop-down tailgate swimming platform, an internally mounted spade-type rudder controlled by dual wheels and a fixed L-shaped fin keel with a weighted bulb or optional shoal-draft keel. The fin keel model displaces 30,644 lb (13,900 kg) empty and carries 9,480 lb (4,300 kg) of cast iron ballast, while the shoal draft version displaces 31,636 lb (14,350 kg) empty and carries 10,472 lb (4,750 kg) of cast iron ballast.

The boat has a draft of 7.42 ft (2.26 m) with the standard keel and 5.67 ft (1.73 m) with the optional shoal draft keel.

The boat is fitted with a Japanese Yanmar diesel engine of 80 hp (60 kW) for docking and maneuvering. The fuel tank holds 63 U.S. gallons (240 L; 52 imp gal) and the fresh water tank has a capacity of 163 U.S. gallons (620 L; 136 imp gal).

The design has sleeping accommodation for six to ten people in three to five cabins. The three cabin interior has a double island berth in the bow cabin, a U-shaped settee and a straight double seat in the main cabin and two aft cabins, each with a double berth. The bow cabin may be divided into two smaller cabins, each with a "V"-berth. Also a small aft crew cabin with two bunk beds may be added aft on the starboard side. The galley is located on the starboard side, amidships. The galley is of a straight configuration and is equipped with a four-burner stove, a refrigerator, freezer and a double sink. A navigation station is opposite the galley, on the port side. There are two heads, one in the bow cabin on the port side and one on the port side, aft. Up to four heads may be fitted in the four cabin interior, two forward and two aft. The cabin maximum headroom is 68 in (173 cm).

For sailing downwind the design may be equipped with a code 0 sail of 1,044 sq ft (97.0 m^{2}). The boat has a hull speed of 9.06 kn (16.78 km/h).

== Operational history ==
The boat is supported by an active class club, the Jeanneau Owners Network.

== See also ==
- List of sailing boat types
