= Atlantic 44 =

Sailboat class

Development
- Designer: Daniel Andrieu
- Location: Greece
- Year: 1990
- Builder: Olympic Marine
- Role: Cruiser-Racer
- Name: Atlantic 44

Boat
- Displacement: 22,050 lb (10,002 kg)
- Draft: 6.96 ft (2.12 m)

Hull
- Type: monohull
- Construction: fiberglass
- LOA: 42.95 ft (13.09 m)
- LWL: 34.75 ft (10.59 m)
- Beam: 13.98 ft (4.26 m)
- Engine: inboard motor

Hull appendages
- Keel: fin keel
- Ballast: 8,155 lb (3,699 kg)
- Rudder: internally-mounted spade-type rudder

Rig
- Rig type: Bermuda rig
- I foretriangle height: 51.51 ft (15.70 m)
- J foretriangle base: 16.57 ft (5.05 m)
- P mainsail luff: 44.79 ft (13.65 m)
- E mainsail foot: 15.75 ft (4.80 m)

Sails
- Sailplan: masthead sloop
- Mainsail area: 352.72 sq ft (32.769 m^{2})
- Jib/genoa area: 426.76 sq ft (39.647 m^{2})
- Total sail area: 779.48 sq ft (72.416 m^{2})

The Atlantic 44 is a Greek sailboat that was designed by Daniel Andrieu as a cruiser-racer and first built in 1990.

The Atlantic 44 is a development of the Sun Magic 44, a boat that was built from 1987 to 1993 by Jeanneau in France. The design was licensed for construction by Olympic Marine in Greece.

== Production ==
The design was built by Olympic Marine in Greece, starting in 1990, but it is now out of production.

== Design ==
The Atlantic 44 is a recreational keelboat, built predominantly of fiberglass, with wood trim. It has a masthead sloop rig. The hull has a raked stem, a reverse transom, an internally mounted spade-type rudder controlled by a wheel tiller and a fixed fin keel. It displaces 22,050 lb (10,002 kg) and carries 8,155 lb (3,699 kg) of ballast.

The boat has a draft of 6.96 ft (2.12 m) with the standard keel and a hull speed of 7.9 kn (14.6 km/h).

== See also ==
- List of sailing boat types
