= Sun Odyssey 42.1 =

Sailboat class

Development
- Designer: Daniel Andrieu
- Location: France
- Year: 1992
- Builder: Jeanneau
- Role: Cruiser
- Name: Sun Odyssey 42.1

Boat
- Displacement: 19,511 lb (8,850 kg)
- Draft: 6.23 ft (1.90 m)

Hull
- Type: monohull
- Construction: fiberglass
- LOA: 41.99 ft (12.80 m)
- LWL: 33.14 ft (10.10 m)
- Beam: 13.06 ft (3.98 m)
- Engine: diesel engine

Hull appendages
- Keel: fin keel with weighted bulb
- Ballast: 6,482 lb (2,940 kg)
- Rudder: spade-type rudder

Rig
- Rig type: Bermuda rig

Sails
- Sailplan: masthead sloop
- Total sail area: 871.88 sq ft (81.000 m^{2})

The Sun Odyssey 42.1 is a French sailboat that was designed by Daniel Andrieu as cruiser and first built in 1992.

The Sun Odyssey 42.1 replaced the unrelated 1990 Sun Odyssey 42 design in production. It was followed by a series of other designs which all had similar names and intended markets, including the 1995 Sun Odyssey 42.2, the 1996 Sun Odyssey 42 CC, the 2005 Sun Odyssey 42i and the 2007 Sun Odyssey 42 DS.

== Production ==
The design was built by Jeanneau in France, from 1992 until 1995, but it is now out of production.

== Design ==
The Sun Odyssey 42.1 is a recreational keelboat, built predominantly of fiberglass, with wood trim. It has a masthead sloop rig, a raked stem, a reverse transom, an internally mounted spade-type rudder controlled by a wheel and a fixed fin keel or optional shoal-draft keel. It displaces 19,511 lb (8,850 kg) and carries 6,482 lb (2,940 kg) of ballast.

The boat has a draft of 6.23 ft (1.90 m) with the standard keel and 4.92 ft (1.50 m) with the optional shoal draft keel.

The design has sleeping accommodation for six people, with a double "V"-berth in the bow cabin, a U-shaped settee and a straight settee in the main cabin and two aft cabins, each with a double berth. The galley is located on the port side, amidships. The galley is an open "U" shape and is equipped with a two-burner stove, an ice box and a double sink. A navigation station is beside the companionway ladder, on the starboard side. There are two heads, one just aft of the bow cabin on the starboard side and one on the port side, aft.

== Operational history ==
The boat is supported by an active class club, the Jeanneau Owners Network.

== See also ==
- List of sailing boat types
