= Sun Odyssey 41 DS =

Sailboat class

Development
- Designer: Philippe Briand; Franck Darnet; Flahault Design
- Location: France
- Year: 2012
- Builder: Jeanneau
- Role: Cruiser
- Name: Sun Odyssey 41 DS

Boat
- Displacement: 19,335 lb (8,770 kg)
- Draft: 6 ft 11 in (2.11 m)

Hull
- Type: monohull
- Construction: fiberglass
- LOA: 40.42 ft (12.32 m)
- LWL: 36.08 ft (11.00 m)
- Beam: 13.91 ft (4.24 m)
- Engine: Yanmar 45 hp (34 kW) diesel engine

Hull appendages
- Keel: fin keel with weighted bulb
- Ballast: 4,982 lb (2,260 kg)
- Rudder: spade-type rudder

Rig
- Rig type: Bermuda rig
- I foretriangle height: 50 ft 11 in (15.52 m)
- J foretriangle base: 14 ft 10 in (4.52 m)
- P mainsail luff: 49 ft 2 in (14.99 m)
- E mainsail foot: 16 ft 1 in (4.90 m)

Sails
- Sailplan: 9/10 fractional rigged sloop
- Mainsail area: 364 sq ft (33.8 m^{2})
- Jib/genoa area: 349 sq ft (32.4 m^{2})
- Gennaker area: 1,173 sq ft (109.0 m^{2})
- Other sails: code 0 753 sq ft (70.0 m^{2})
- Upwind sail area: 713 sq ft (66.2 m^{2})
- Downwind sail area: 1,537 sq ft (142.8 m^{2})

The Sun Odyssey 41 DS (Deck Salon) is a French sailboat with a hull that was designed by Philippe Briand, the deck and interior by Franck Darnet and Flahault Design. It was designed as a cruiser and first built in 2012.

The Sun Odyssey 41 DS design uses the same hull design as the 2010 Sun Odyssey 409 and it replaced the Sun Odyssey 42 DS in the product line.

== Production ==
The design was built by Jeanneau in France, from 2012 to 2019, but it is now out of production.

== Design ==
The Sun Odyssey 41 DS is a recreational keelboat, built predominantly of vacuum bagged, resin infused polyester fiberglass, with wood trim. The hull is solid fiberglass while the deck has a balsa core. It has a 9/10 fractional sloop rig, with a deck-stepped mast, two sets of swept spreaders and aluminum spars with 1X19 stainless steel wire rigging. An in-mast roller furling mainsail was a factory option. The hull has a plumb stem, a walk-through reverse transom with a swimming platform, an internally mounted spade-type rudder controlled by dual wheels and a fixed fin keel or optional shoal-draft keel. It displaces 19,335 lb (8,770 kg) and carries 4,982 lb (2,260 kg) of cast iron ballast.

The boat has a draft of 6 ft 11 in (2.11 m) with the standard keel and 5 ft 1 in (1.55 m) with the optional shoal draft keel.

The boat is fitted with a Japanese Yanmar diesel engine of 45 hp (34 kW) for docking and maneuvering. A 360° rotating saildrive and a bow thruster for docking were optional. The fuel tank holds 53 U.S. gallons (200 L; 44 imp gal) and the fresh water tank has a capacity of 87 U.S. gallons (330 L; 72 imp gal).

The design was only built in one interior arrangement, with sleeping accommodation for four people, with a double "V"-berth in the bow cabin, a U-shaped settee and a straight settee in the main cabin and an aft "owner's cabin" with a double island berth. The galley is located on the starboard side at the companionway ladder. The galley is L-shaped and is equipped with a three-burner stove, an ice box and a double sink. A navigation station is opposite the galley, on the port side. There are two heads, one in the bow cabin on the starboard side and one on the port side, aft. Cabin maximum headroom is 77 in (196 cm).

For sailing downwind the design may be equipped with an asymmetrical spinnaker of 1,173 sq ft (109.0 m^{2}) or a code 0 of 753 sq ft (70.0 m^{2}).

The design has a hull speed of 8.05 kn (14.91 km/h).

== Operational history ==
In a Yachting Today review, Jane Hyde wrote, "creating an attractive looking yacht with a deck saloon at just over 40ft (12.2m) is no easy task, but Jeanneau’s stylist, Franck Darnet has done well with the 41DS. Although she's one of the most streamlined cruising yachts of her size, I felt her gradually sloping 'eyebrow' superstructure didn't quite suit this length of boat and would be more at home on a 50ft plus (15.2m) yacht."

In a 2012 Yacht magazine review, Dieter Loibner wrote, "this model, with large windows and a slightly elevated saloon is the only new vessel for the 2012/2013 boat show season next to the Sun Odyssey 469. Looks and concept are closely related to the 44 DS. Both boats feature the idiosyncratic gray stripe above the windows on the coachroof that’s a bit reminiscent of an eyebrow. It helps distinguish these boats from earlier DS models."

Tom Dove wrote a review for Sail Magazine in 2013 and concluded, "while 40 feet is about the minimum size for the deck saloon layout to function well, Jeanneau has created a spacious, comfortable interior, an efficient deck layout for shorthanded sailing and attractive appearance in their 41DS. Add easy handling and sound construction and the result is a winner."

In a 2013 review, Chris Beeson wrote in Yachting Monthly, "she's comfortable. The helm positions are secure, nicely contained by the wheel forward, coamings outboard and the pushpit seating rail aft, which really benefits from the optional cockpit cushions. At the wheels, you have everything you need immediately to hand: mainsheet, jibsheet, backstay, instruments, plotter and engine controls. She is very easy to sail short-handed or even singlehanded. The feel at the wheel wasn’t sensational but that was due to the hydraulic autopilot ram, which is a very useful addition to a cruising yacht such as this, so it's swings and roundabouts."

== See also ==
- List of sailing boat types
