= Scamp Sailing Team =

Polish sailing team

Scamp

Career
- Yacht club: Polish Yachting Association
- Established: 2015
- Nation: Poland
- Team principal(s): Witold Karałow; Maciej Gnatowski; Andrzej Brochocki; Bogusław Gnatowski
- Skipper: Witold Karałow; Maciej Gnatowski
- Notable victories: ORC Oxelösund 2019

Yachts
- Sail no.: Boat name
- Scamp One
- Scamp 27
- Scamp 3

Scamp Sailing Team
Medal record

Representing Poland

European championships in sailing
Bronze medal – third place	Oxelosund 2019	Soto40

Scamp (Scamp Sailing Team) is a Polish sailing team.

In 2019 they won bronze medal during ORC European Championships in Oxelösund.

== Establishment and history ==
Team was formed in 2015 by Maciej Gnatowski and Witold Karałow. Until 2017 the team was training on the yacht Scamp One, manufactured by American company Reichel/Pugh. During 2017/2018 and 2018/2019 seasons the team trained on Scamp 27 (class Soto 40). In 2020 a new yacht was bought by Scamp team, Scamp 3 (class HH42) manufactured by Hudson Yacht Group.

The team currently holds a record time on route Gdynia–Gotland–Gdynia (Scamp 3).

For 2021/22 season, the team plans to participate in Europe's and world's major races.

== Awards ==
Scamp Sailing Team has won many awards presented on Polish waters. Among them are:

- Bronze medal during ORC European Championships in Oxelösund 2019
- Bursztynowy Puchar Neptuna 2019
- Lotos Nord Cup 2019

== Team members ==
2020/2021 season crew:

- Jakub Marciniak – captain and tactician
- Grzegorz Goździk – bosman and foreman
- Mikołaj Gielniak – mastman
- Piotr Obidziński – mastman
- Andrzej Grabowski – pitman
- Maciej Ślusarek – front sail trimmer
- Kuba Jankowski – front sail trimmer
- Maciej Gnatowski – back sail trimmer
- Andrzej Brochocki – running backstay
- Mateusz Zieniewicz – running backstay
- Witold Karałow – skipper
- Bogusław Gnatowski – team senior
