= Sun Odyssey 42i =

Sailboat class

Development
- Designer: Marc Lombard
- Location: France
- Year: 2005
- Builder: Jeanneau
- Role: Cruiser
- Name: Sun Odyssey 42i

Boat
- Displacement: 18,541 lb (8,410 kg)
- Draft: 6.99 ft (2.13 m)

Hull
- Type: monohull
- Construction: fiberglass
- LOA: 42.16 ft (12.85 m)
- LWL: 38.06 ft (11.60 m)
- Beam: 13.55 ft (4.13 m)
- Engine: Yanmar 4JH4E 54 hp (40 kW) diesel engine

Hull appendages
- Keel: fin keel with weighted bulb
- Ballast: 5,628 lb (2,553 kg)
- Rudder: spade-type rudder

Rig
- Rig type: Bermuda rig
- I foretriangle height: 50.85 ft (15.50 m)
- J foretriangle base: 15.94 ft (4.86 m)
- P mainsail luff: 48.82 ft (14.88 m)
- E mainsail foot: 14.60 ft (4.45 m)

Sails
- Sailplan: fractional rigged sloop
- Mainsail area: 356.39 sq ft (33.110 m^{2})
- Jib/genoa area: 405.27 sq ft (37.651 m^{2})
- Total sail area: 761.66 sq ft (70.761 m^{2})

Racing
- PHRF: 75-87

The Sun Odyssey 42i is a French sailboat that was designed by Marc Lombard as a cruiser and first built in 2005. The "i" in the designation indicates that the deck is injection-molded.

The Sun Odyssey 42i is one of a series of designs with similar names and intended markets, including the 1990 Sun Odyssey 42, 1992 Sun Odyssey 42.1, the 1995 Sun Odyssey 42.2, the 1996 Sun Odyssey 42 CC and the 2007 Sun Odyssey 42 DS.

== Production ==
The design was built by Jeanneau in France, starting in 2005, but it is now out of production.

== Design ==
The Sun Odyssey 42i is a recreational keelboat, built predominantly of fiberglass, with wood trim. It has a fractional sloop rig, with two sets of swept spreaders and aluminum spars with stainless steel rigging. The hull has a raked stem, a reverse transom with steps, an internally mounted spade-type rudder controlled by dual wheels and a fixed fin keel or optional shoal-draft keel. It displaces 18,541 lb (8,410 kg) and carries 5,628 lb (2,553 kg) of iron ballast.

The boat has a draft of 6.99 ft (2.13 m) with the standard keel and 5.25 ft (1.60 m) with the optional shoal draft keel.

The boat is fitted with a Japanese Yanmar 4JH4E diesel engine of 54 hp (40 kW) for docking and maneuvering. The fuel tank holds 34 U.S. gallons (130 L; 28 imp gal) and the fresh water tank has a capacity of 94 U.S. gallons (360 L; 78 imp gal).

The design was built in two and three cabin layouts. The two cabin configuration has sleeping accommodation for six people, with a double berth in the "owner's" bow cabin, a fold-down dinette table in the main cabin that can form a double berth and an aft cabin with a double berth on the starboard side. The galley is located on the starboard side and is equipped with a two-burner propane-fired stove, a top-loading refrigerator and a double sink. A navigation station with a hideaway table is on the port side. There are two heads, one just aft of the bow cabin and one on the port side in the aft cabin, both with shower cabinets.

The design has a hull speed of 8.27 kn (15.32 km/h) and a PHRF handicap of 75 to 87.

== Operational history ==
In a 2007 review for Cruising World, Mark Pillsbury wrote, "close reaching in 9 knots of wind off Miami’s South Beach, my Garmin Gekko GPS had us sailing 5.8 knots over the ground. And even more impressive was the fact that had I not taken a hold of the wheel and put us on a port tack, the boat in all likelihood would have kept right on sailing by herself until we could step ashore on the beach. With its shoal-draft keel (deep keel is standard), spade hung rudder, and balanced sails, the 42i tracked straight as an arrow when left to herself, a good trait for a cruising sailboat. And that's what the Sun Odyssey 42i is-a comfortable, performance-oriented coastal cruiser..."

== See also ==
- List of sailing boat types
