= Sun Odyssey 42 DS =

Sailboat class

Development
- Designer: Marc Lombard
- Location: France
- Year: 2007
- Builder: Jeanneau
- Role: Cruiser
- Name: Sun Odyssey 42 DS

Boat
- Displacement: 19,676 lb (8,925 kg)
- Draft: 6.99 ft (2.13 m)

Hull
- Type: monohull
- Construction: fiberglass
- LOA: 42.42 ft (12.93 m)
- LWL: 38.06 ft (11.60 m)
- Beam: 13.55 ft (4.13 m)
- Engine: Yanmar 4JH4AE diesel engine

Hull appendages
- Keel: fin keel with weighted bulb
- Ballast: 5,628 lb (2,553 kg)
- Rudder: spade-type rudder

Rig
- Rig type: Bermuda rig
- I foretriangle height: 51.71 ft (15.76 m)
- J foretriangle base: 15.94 ft (4.86 m)
- P mainsail luff: 48.82 ft (14.88 m)
- E mainsail foot: 14.60 ft (4.45 m)

Sails
- Sailplan: fractional rigged sloop
- Mainsail area: 356.39 sq ft (33.110 m^{2})
- Jib/genoa area: 412.13 sq ft (38.288 m^{2})
- Total sail area: 768.51 sq ft (71.397 m^{2})

Racing
- PHRF: 93-102 (standard keel); 90-114 (shoal draft keel)

The Sun Odyssey 42 DS (Deck Salon) is a French sailboat that was designed by Marc Lombard as a cruiser and first built in 2007.

The Sun Odyssey 42 DS is one of a series of designs with similar names and intended markets, including the 1990 Sun Odyssey 42, 1992 Sun Odyssey 42.1, the 1995 Sun Odyssey 42.2, the 1996 Sun Odyssey 42 CC and the 2005 Sun Odyssey 42i.

The Sun Odyssey 41 DS replaced the Sun Odyssey 42 DS in the product line in 2012.

== Production ==
The design was built by Jeanneau in France, starting in 2007, but it is now out of production.

== Design ==
The Sun Odyssey 42 DS is a recreational keelboat, built predominantly of fiberglass, with wood trim. It has a fractional sloop rig with a deck-stepped mast, a nearly plumb stem, a reverse transom with steps to a swimming platform, an internally mounted spade-type rudder controlled by dual wheels and a fixed fin keel or optional shoal-draft keel. It displaces 19,676 lb (8,925 kg) and carries 5,628 lb (2,553 kg) of ballast.

A tall rig is available for sailing in areas with lighter winds. The tall rig mast is about 2 ft (0.61 m) higher.

The boat has a draft of 6.99 ft (2.13 m) with the standard keel and 5.16 ft (1.57 m) with the optional shoal draft keel.

The boat is fitted with a Japanese Yanmar 4JH4AE diesel engine for docking and maneuvering. The fuel tank holds 34 U.S. gallons (130 L; 28 imp gal) and the fresh water tank has a capacity of 94 U.S. gallons (360 L; 78 imp gal).

The design was built with the option of a two or three cabin interior layout. The two cabin layout has sleeping accommodation for four people, with a double "V"-berth in the bow cabin, a U-shaped settee and a straight settee in the main cabin and an aft cabin with a large double berth. The three cabin layout divides the aft cabin into two cabins, each with a double berth. The galley is located on the starboard side just forward of the companionway ladder. The galley is L-shaped and is equipped with a two-burner stove, an ice box and a double sink. A navigation station is opposite the galley, on the port side. There are two heads, one just aft of the bow cabin on the starboard side and one on the port side in the aft cabin. in the two cabin interior the aft head is enlarged.

The design has a hull speed of 8.27 kn (15.32 km/h) and a PHRF handicap of 93 to 102 with the standard keel and 90 to 114 with the shoal draft keel.

== Operational history ==
In a 2006 review for Cruising World, Herb McCormick noted, "one of the nice things about this 42-footer is that they didn’t try and do too much with it. The 42 DS has a nice double cabin forward, the airy saloon/nav area/galley in the middle, and a totally inviting owner’s cabin aft. That's it. Oh, yes, there are a couple of heads, one tucked up front in the V-berth cabin and another to starboard, at the foot of the companionway (which can be accessed from the central living space or the owner's quarters), but both have been integrated into the interior plan so well that they’re in no way intrusive."

In a 2007 Sail Magazine review, Bill Springer wrote, "this boat seems to have found the sweet spot in several areas. It has an updated look that is not too radical, and its comfortable accommodations satisfy both form and function. Light-air performance is good, and I’d guess it could handle plenty more wind without much trouble. All the necessary ingredients for cruising—stowage, comfortable bunks, and galley space—are there. Engine access is a bit tight and the cockpit has a funny step in the seat, but these are small issues in a generally successful design."

== See also ==
- List of sailing boat types
