= Sun Odyssey 42 CC =

Sailboat class

Development
- Designer: Guy Ribadeau Dumas
- Location: France
- Year: 1996
- No. built: 45
- Builder: Jeanneau
- Role: Cruiser

Boat
- Displacement: 18,960 lb (8,600 kg)
- Draft: 6.56 ft (2.00 m)

Hull
- Type: monohull
- Construction: fiberglass
- LOA: 42.16 ft (12.85 m)
- LWL: 33.30 ft (10.15 m)
- Beam: 13.45 ft (4.10 m)
- Engine: Yanmar diesel engine 59 hp (44 kW)

Hull appendages
- Keel: fin keel
- Ballast: 5,754 lb (2,610 kg)
- Rudder: spade-type rudder

Rig
- Rig type: Bermuda rig
- I foretriangle height: 50.85 ft (15.50 m)
- J foretriangle base: 15.26 ft (4.65 m)
- P mainsail luff: 44.75 ft (13.64 m)
- E mainsail foot: 15.42 ft (4.70 m)

Sails
- Sailplan: masthead sloop
- Mainsail area: 345.25 sq ft (32.075 m^{2})
- Jib/genoa area: 387.99 sq ft (36.045 m^{2})
- Total sail area: 732.24 sq ft (68.027 m^{2})

The Sun Odyssey 42 CC (Center Cockpit), also called the Jeanneau 42 CC, is a French sailboat that was designed by Guy Ribadeau Dumas as a cruiser and first built in 1996.

The Sun Odyssey 42 CC is one of a series of designs with similar names and intended markets, including the 1990 Sun Odyssey 42, 1992 Sun Odyssey 42.1, the 1995 Sun Odyssey 42.2, the 2005 Sun Odyssey 42i and the 2007 Sun Odyssey 42 DS.

The Sun Odyssey 42 CC uses the same hull design as the Sun Odyssey 42.2.

== Production ==
The design was built by Jeanneau in France, starting in 1996, with 45 boats completed, but it is now out of production.

== Design ==
The Sun Odyssey 42 CC is a recreational keelboat, built predominantly of fiberglass. It has a center cockpit, a masthead sloop rig, a raked stem, a reverse transom with steps to a swimming platform, an internally mounted spade-type rudder controlled by a wheel and a fixed fin keel with a weighted bulb. It displaces 18,960 lb (8,600 kg) and carries 5,754 lb (2,610 kg) of ballast in the fin keel version and 6,283 lb (2,850 kg) of ballast in the shoal draft keel version.

The boat has a draft of 6.56 ft (2.00 m) with the standard keel and 5.41 ft (1.65 m) with the optional shoal draft keel.

The boat is fitted with a Japanese Yanmar 59 hp (44 kW) diesel engine for docking and maneuvering. A 62 hp (46 kW) diesel engine was a factory option. The fuel tank holds 59 U.S. gallons (220 L; 49 imp gal) and the fresh water tank has a capacity of 116 U.S. gallons (440 L; 97 imp gal).

The design has sleeping accommodation for four people, with a double "V"-berth in the bow cabin, a U-shaped settee and two single seats in the main cabin and a large aft cabin with a double berth. The galley is located on the starboard side just aft of the companionway ladder. The galley is U-shaped and is equipped with a four-burner stove, an ice box and a double sink. A navigation station is opposite the galley, on the port side. There are two heads, one just aft of the bow cabin on the starboard side and one on the port side in the aft cabin.

The design has a hull speed of 7.73 kn (14.32 km/h).

== Operational history ==
In a 1997 review Bill Lee wrote for Cruising World, "the Jeanneau 42 CC, like so many center-cockpit boats under 42 feet the aft cabin is wonderful and guest accommodations are somewhat squeezed. This is fine by our criteria because we assume that the primary user will be a couple who may live onboard for extended periods. The owner's berth is 65 inches wide on centerline, and the cushions are split so that a centerline lee cloth can be fitted when at sea. The companionway ladder is well done with even steps that curve up on the ends for footing when heeled. The galley is located in the passageway to the aft stateroom. It is a good working galley with huge refrigerator capacity"

== See also ==
- List of sailing boat types
