= Sun Odyssey 44 DS =

Sailboat class

Development
- Designer: Philippe Briand; Franck Darnet; Flahault Design; Jeanneau Design Office
- Location: France
- Year: 2011
- Builder: Jeanneau
- Role: Cruiser
- Name: Sun Odyssey 44 DS

Boat
- Displacement: 21,495 lb (9,750 kg)
- Draft: 7.22 ft (2.20 m)

Hull
- Type: monohull
- Construction: fiberglass
- LOA: 43.77 ft (13.34 m)
- LWL: 39.37 ft (12.00 m)
- Beam: 13.91 ft (4.24 m)
- Engine: Yanmar 54 hp (40 kW) diesel engine

Hull appendages
- Keel: fin keel with weighted bulb
- Ballast: 6,945 lb (3,150 kg)
- Rudder: spade-type rudder

Rig
- Rig type: Bermuda rig
- I foretriangle height: 54 ft 6 in (16.61 m)
- J foretriangle base: 17 ft 1 in (5.21 m)
- P mainsail luff: 52 ft 6 in (16.00 m)
- E mainsail foot: 16 ft 5 in (5.00 m)

Sails
- Sailplan: 9/10 fractional rigged sloop
- Mainsail area: 431 sq ft (40.0 m^{2})
- Jib/genoa area: 477 sq ft (44.3 m^{2})
- Gennaker area: 1,432 sq ft (133.0 m^{2})
- Other sails: Code 0: 822 sq ft (76.4 m^{2})
- Upwind sail area: 877 sq ft (81.5 m^{2})
- Downwind sail area: 1,862 sq ft (173.0 m^{2})

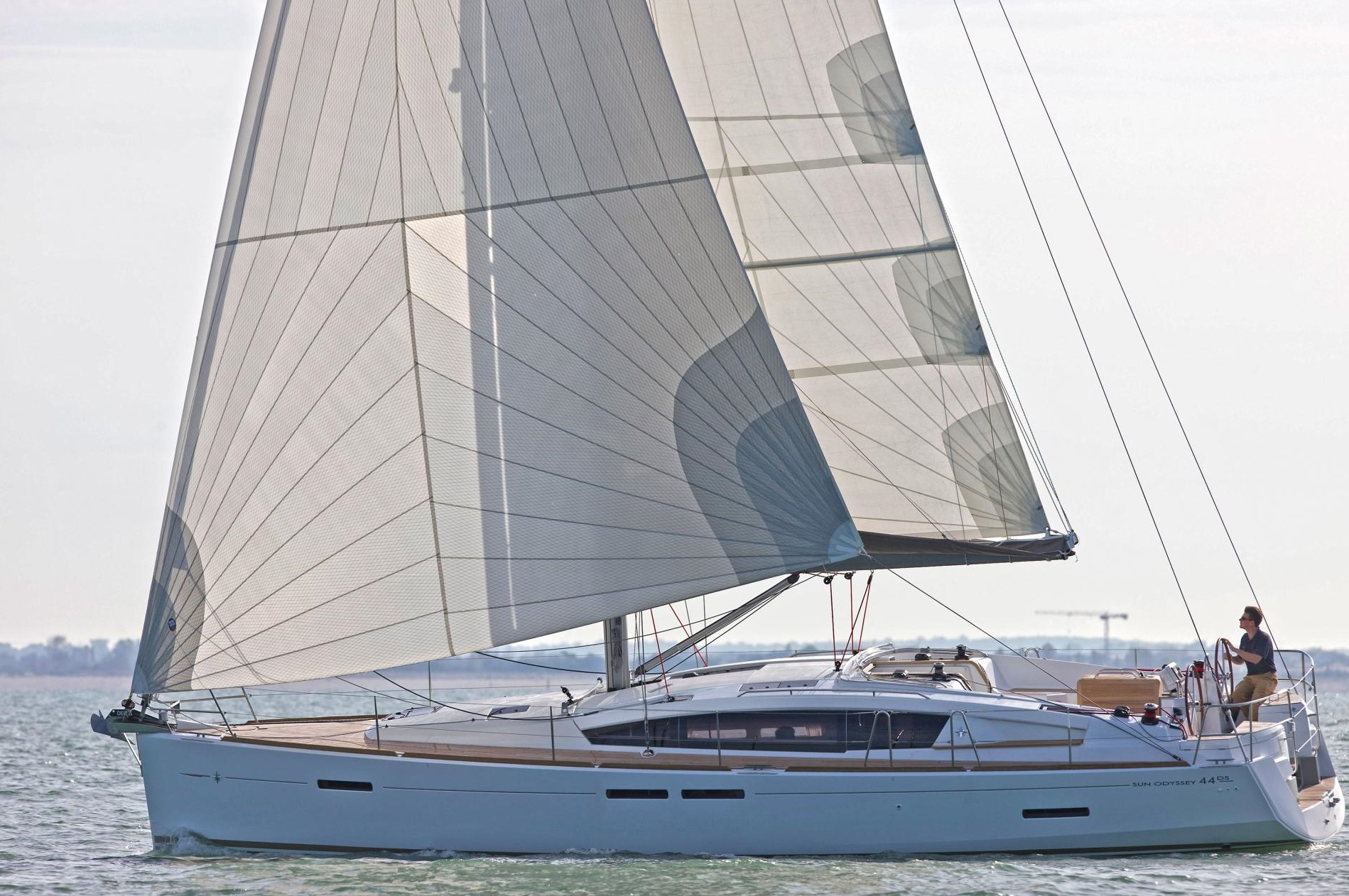
Jeanneau 44DS

The Sun Odyssey 44 DS (Deck Salon) is a French sailboat with a hull that was designed by Philippe Briand, deck and interior by Franck Darnet, Flahault Design and the Jeanneau Design Office. It was designed as a cruiser and first built in 2011.

The boat shares a hull design with the 2011 Sun Odyssey 439.

== Production ==
The design was built by Jeanneau in France, from 2011 to 2018, but it is now out of production.

== Design ==
The Sun Odyssey 44 DS is a recreational keelboat, built predominantly of polyester fiberglass, with wood trim. The hull is solid fiberglass, while deck uses the Prisma injection-molding process. It has a 9/10 fractional sloop rig, with a deck-stepped mast, two sets of swept spreaders and aluminum spars with 1X19 stainless steel wire rigging. The hard chine hull has a plumb stem, a walk-through reverse transom with a swimming platform, an internally mounted spade-type rudder controlled by dual wheels and a fixed L-shaped fin keel with a weighted bulb or optional shoal-draft keel. The boat displaces 21,495 lb (9,750 kg) and carries 6,945 lb (3,150 kg) of cast iron ballast.

The boat has a draft of 7.22 ft (2.20 m) with the standard keel and 5.16 ft (1.57 m) with the optional shoal draft keel.

The boat is fitted with a Japanese Yanmar 4JH5E diesel engine of 54 hp (40 kW) for docking and maneuvering. Models included either a Yanmar SD50 or SD60 saildrive. The fuel tank holds 53 U.S. gallons (200 L; 44 imp gal) and the fresh water tank has a capacity of 87 U.S. gallons (330 L; 72 imp gal).

The design has sleeping accommodation for four to six people, with a double "V"-berth in the bow cabin, a U-shaped settee and a straight settee in the main cabin and an aft cabin with a double island berth. An optional third cabin was available forward to port, with two staggered bunk beds. The galley is located on the starboard side at the companionway ladder. The galley is L-shaped and is equipped with a three-burner stove, an ice box and a double sink. A navigation station is opposite the galley, on the port side. There are two heads, one in the forward section of the boat on the starboard side, and one aft, on the port side of the companionway. Cabin maximum headroom is 79 in (201 cm).

For sailing downwind the design may be equipped with an asymmetrical spinnaker of 1,432 sq ft (133.0 m^{2}), or a code 0 of 822 sq ft (76.4 m^{2}).

The design has a hull speed of 8.41 kn (15.58 km/h).

== Operational history ==
In a 2012 Cruising World review, Alvah Simon concluded, "the 44 DS won’t necessarily attract the performance-oriented sailor. Nor will it appeal to the aesthetic eye of the traditionalists. But for those looking for a large, cheerful, modern living space, with ample sailing and powering ability to carry them in comfort to far-flung destinations, the 44 DS deserves an inspection."

In a Boats.com review in 2012, Zuzana Prochazka wrote, "with the new hull design, the Jeanneau 44DS not only looks fast, it sails fast—and with various sail plan options, is easily sailed by a couple. The ergonomic deck also provides lots of room and is easy to move about without a lot of shin banging obstacles."

A 2017 review by Adam Cort for Sail Magazine, "I didn’t expect much from this boat, but the Jeanneau Sun Odyssey 44DS is living proof that looks and good performance don't have to be mutually exclusive. The day of our test sail was gray and blustery, gusting to 20 knots out of the northeast, and the 44DS couldn't have been happier. Unrolling the main and jib just off the Jeanneau office in Eastport, Maryland, the boat quickly accelerated to 7 knots and more on a close reach. Equally important, it quickly locked into a groove, slicing through the chop cleanly in a way that required almost no effort at the helm."

== See also ==
- List of sailing boat types
