= Voyage 12.5 =

Sailboat class

Development
- Designer: Guy Ribadeau Dumas
- Location: France
- Year: 1987
- Builder: Jeanneau
- Role: Cruiser

Boat
- Displacement: 17,967 lb (8,150 kg)
- Draft: 5.42 ft (1.65 m)

Hull
- Type: monohull
- Construction: fiberglass
- LOA: 41.0 ft (12.5 m)
- LWL: 33.33 ft (10.16 m)
- Beam: 13.33 ft (4.06 m)
- Engine: Yanmar 55 hp (41 kW) diesel engine

Hull appendages
- Keel: fin keel
- Ballast: 7,385 lb (3,350 kg)
- Rudder: skeg-mounted rudder

Rig
- Rig type: Bermuda rig

Sails
- Sailplan: masthead sloop
- Total sail area: 793.00 sq ft (73.672 m^{2})

Racing
- PHRF: 105-108

The Voyage 12.5 is a French sailboat type that was designed by Guy Ribadeau Dumas as a cruiser and first built in 1987. The designation refers to the boat's length overall of 41.0 feet (12.5 metres).

The Voyage 12.5 design was developed into the Sun Odyssey 42 in 1990.

== Production ==
The design was built by Jeanneau in France, starting in 1987, but it is now out of production.

== Design ==
The Voyage 12.5 is a recreational keelboat, built predominantly of fiberglass, with wood trim. It has a masthead sloop rig. The hull has a raked stem, a step-equipped reverse transom, a skeg-mounted rudder controlled by a wheel and a fixed fin keel. It displaces 17,967 lb (8,150 kg) and carries 7,385 lb (3,350 kg) of ballast.

The boat has a draft of 5.42 ft (1.65 m) with the standard keel.

The boat is fitted with Japanese Yanmar diesel engine of 55 hp (41 kW) for docking and maneuvering. The fuel tank holds 50 U.S. gallons (190 L; 42 imp gal) and the fresh water tank has a capacity of 119 U.S. gallons (450 L; 99 imp gal).

The design has sleeping accommodation for six people, with a double "V"-berth in the bow cabin and two aft cabins, each with a double berth. There are two main cabin arrangements, one with a round table to starboard and the galley to port and the other with a U-shaped settee to port around a rectangular table and the gallery to starboard. In both arrangements the galley is equipped with a four-burner stove, an ice box and a double sink. A navigation station on the starboard side. There are two heads, one just aft of the bow cabin on the starboard side and one on the port side just forward of the aft cabins.

The design has a hull speed of 7.74 kn (14.33 km/h) and a PHRF handicap of 105 to 108.

== See also ==
- List of sailing boat types
