= Highfield lever =

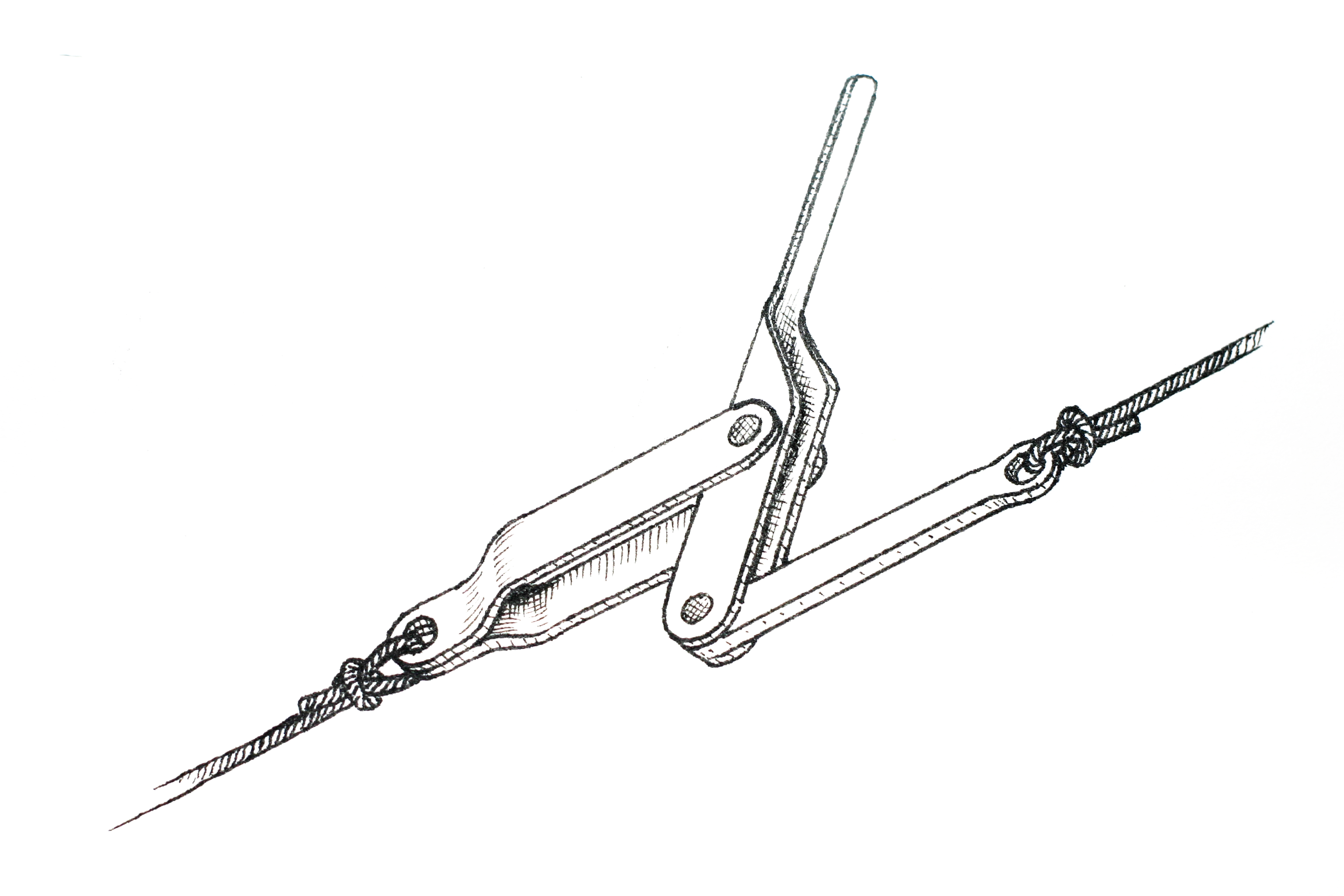
A basic Highfield lever.

A Highfield lever is a lever device which allows tension to be rapidly set up in a wire and equally rapidly released to the required extent. It is frequently used in sailing boats where tension in some part of the rigging needs to be adjusted to a pre-set amount as the wind impinges on one side of the sails or the other. It is typically used in running backstays (runners).

To make it work in this application, the backstay is led through a block or fairlead along the deck to a two-legged, second order lever mounted with its fulcrum above deck level. The end of the runner is attached to a cross-member between the two legs and part way along the lever. When the lever is moved away from the fairlead, tension is placed on the runner on a line below the fulcrum so that the lever is pulled down onto the deck. When the tension is to be released, the lever is thrown towards the fairlead. When released, the amount of slack in the runner is therefore twice the distance of the attachment point from the fulcrum. It is not necessary to have great leverage as the adjustment is made at a point in the manoeuvring of the boat when the rigging is slack. The significant point is that the lever should be designed to take up the required amount of slack.

It is possible to arrange a Highfield lever to work two backstays or shrouds by mounting the lever transversely so that it is thrown from side to side rather than fore and aft, tensioning the rigging on one side of the boat as it relaxes the other.

In other applications the lever can be mounted on a stay itself; such an application can be seen in the accompanying illustration.

The Highfield lever was invented by J. S. Highfield, an electrical engineer and rear-commodore with the Royal Thames Yacht Club, in about 1930.
