= Sun Odyssey 39 DS =

Sailboat class

Development
- Designer: Marc Lombard; Vittorio Garroni
- Location: France
- Year: 2008
- Builder: Jeanneau
- Role: Cruiser
- Name: Sun Odyssey 39 DS

Boat
- Displacement: 17,331 lb (7,861 kg)
- Draft: 6.58 ft (2.01 m)

Hull
- Type: monohull
- Construction: fiberglass
- LOA: 38.92 ft (11.86 m)
- LWL: 36.16 ft (11.02 m)
- Beam: 12.75 ft (3.89 m)
- Engine: Yanmar 3JH4E 40 hp (30 kW) diesel engine

Hull appendages
- Keel: fin keel with weighted bulb
- Ballast: 5,026 lb (2,280 kg)
- Rudder: spade-type rudder

Rig
- Rig type: Bermuda rig
- I foretriangle height: 48.33 ft (14.73 m)
- J foretriangle base: 13.83 ft (4.22 m)
- P mainsail luff: 47.08 ft (14.35 m)
- E mainsail foot: 15.92 ft (4.85 m)

Sails
- Sailplan: 9/10 fractional rigged sloop
- Mainsail area: 357 sq ft (33.2 m^{2})
- Jib/genoa area: 368 sq ft (34.2 m^{2})
- Spinnaker area: 1,044 sq ft (97.0 m^{2})
- Upwind sail area: 752 sq ft (69.9 m^{2})
- Downwind sail area: 1,401 sq ft (130.2 m^{2})

The Sun Odyssey 39 DS (Deck Salon) is a French sailboat that was designed by Marc Lombard and Vittorio Garroni as a cruiser and first built in 2008.

== Production ==
The design was built by Jeanneau in France, starting in 2008, but it is now out of production.

== Design ==
The Sun Odyssey 39 DS is a recreational keelboat, built predominantly of resin-injected polyester fiberglass, with a core of end-grain balsa. It has a 9/10 fractional sloop rig, with a deck-stepped mast, two sets of swept spreaders and aluminum spars with continuous stainless steel 1X19 wire rigging. An in-mast furling mainsail was a factory option. The hull has a raked stem, a reverse transom with a swimming platform, an internally mounted spade-type rudder controlled by dual wheels and a fixed fin keel, deep draft fin keel or optional shoal-draft keel.

A "performance" version has a mast that is about 2.17 ft (0.66 m) taller and a sail area that is 17% larger.

The fin keel model displaces 17,331 lb (7,861 kg) and carries 5,026 lb (2,280 kg) of cast iron ballast, the deep draft version carries 4,361 lb (1,978 kg) of ballast, while the shoal draft version displaces 17,196 lb (7,800 kg) and carries 5,027 lb (2,280 kg) of ballast.

The boat has a draft of 6.58 ft (2.01 m) with the standard keel, 7.25 ft (2.21 m) with the deep draft keel and 4.92 ft (1.50 m) with the optional shoal draft keel.

The boat is fitted with a Japanese Yanmar 3JH4E diesel engine of 40 hp (30 kW) for docking and maneuvering. The fuel tank holds 34 U.S. gallons (130 L; 28 imp gal) and the fresh water tank has a capacity of 94 U.S. gallons (360 L; 78 imp gal).

The design has sleeping accommodation for four people, with a double "V"-berth in the bow cabin, a U-shaped settee and a straight settee in the main cabin and an aft cabin with a transversal double berth on the starboard side. The galley is located on the starboard, side just forward of the companionway ladder. The galley is L-shaped and is equipped with a two-burner stove, an ice box and a double sink. A navigation station is opposite the galley, on the port side. The head is located just aft of the companionway on the port side and includes a shower. The cabin maximum headroom is 74 in (188 cm).

For sailing downwind the design may be equipped with a symmetrical spinnaker of 1,044 sq ft (97.0 m^{2}).

The design has a hull speed of 7.94 kn (14.70 km/h).

== Operational history ==
A Cruising World review in January 2007 by Andrew Burton stated, "the twin wheels allow the helmsman to get well outboard with a good view of the sails, and the primary winches are immediately forward of the wheels so the driver can trim the jib. The helm had a nice, tight feel, and I found the boat a pleasure to steer. Even with in-mast furling, the SO 39 DS performed well in my light-air test sail."

In a second Andrew Burton Cruising World review in February 2007, he wrote, "The DS in the Jeanneau Sun Odyssey 39 DS stands for deck saloon. In this case that’s a bit of a stretch; the house is higher than on the boat’s racier sister, the 39i, but seating isn't at deck level. Semantic nitpicking aside, this is a good entry onto the cruising-boat scene ... Two couples will be happy cruising on the Sun Odyssey 39 DS. The boat's performance will please racers, while the amenities throughout will ensure everyone aboard understands that they’re cruising.

In a 2017 Sail Magazine review reported, "the most recent deck-saloon launch, the 39 DS, is probably about the minimum length for this popular layout and is designed to provide, in a smaller package, the features its bigger sisterships provide. The freeboard is necessarily high, but the curvy line of the deck saloon makes the boat attractive."

== See also ==
- List of sailing boat types
