= Sun Odyssey 42 =

Sailboat class

Development
- Designer: Guy Ribadeau Dumas
- Location: France
- Year: 1990
- Builder: Jeanneau
- Role: Cruiser
- Name: Sun Odyssey 42

Boat
- Displacement: 17,968 lb (8,150 kg)
- Draft: 5.41 ft (1.65 m)

Hull
- Type: monohull
- Construction: fiberglass
- LOA: 41.01 ft (12.50 m)
- LWL: 33.30 ft (10.15 m)
- Beam: 13.29 ft (4.05 m)
- Engine: inboard motor

Hull appendages
- Keel: fin keel
- Ballast: 7,385 lb (3,350 kg)
- Rudder: partial skeg-mounted rudder

Rig
- Rig type: Bermuda rig

Sails
- Sailplan: masthead sloop
- Total sail area: 893.40 sq ft (83.000 m^{2})

The Sun Odyssey 42 is a French sailboat that was designed by Guy Ribadeau Dumas, as a cruiser and first built in 1990.

The Sun Odyssey 42 was followed in production by a series of unrelated designs with similar names and intended markets, including the 1992 Sun Odyssey 42.1, the 1995 Sun Odyssey 42.2, the 1996 Sun Odyssey 42 CC, the 2005 Sun Odyssey 42i and the 2007 Sun Odyssey 42 DS.

== Production ==
The design was built by Jeanneau in France, from 1990 to 1992, but it is now out of production.

== Design ==
The Sun Odyssey 42 is a recreational keelboat, built predominantly of fiberglass, with wood trim. It has a masthead sloop rig, a raked stem, a step-down reverse transom wiyth a swim platform, a partial skeg-mounted rudder controlled by a wheel and a fixed fin keel. It displaces 17,968 lb (8,150 kg) and carries 7,385 lb (3,350 kg) of ballast.

The boat has a draft of 5.41 ft (1.65 m) with the standard keel.

The design has sleeping accommodation for six people, with a double "V"-berth in the bow cabin, a semi-circular settee around a round table in the main cabin and twin aft cabins, each equipped with a double berth. The galley is located on the port side just forward of the companionway ladder. The galley is equipped with a two-burner stove, an ice box and a double sink. A navigation station is opposite the galley, on the starboard side. The head is located just aft of the bow cabin on the starboard side. There are also sinks located in each of then aft cabins on the centerline.

== See also ==
- List of sailing boat types
