= Running backstay =

Boat rigging component

A running backstay is a rigging component on a sailboat which helps support the mast. A running backstay runs from each lateral corner of the stern to the mast at the level where the forestay begins in the fractional rig. Because they are attached low on the mast, they can present a significant problem in an accidental gybe, as the boom hits the stay, with the possibility of breaking the boom, mast, or both.

During beating or reaching, the running backstay in windward side is in tension. The one in the leeward side is lazy. As the boat tacks they change over. Another function of the running backstay is to adjust the tension of the forestay to suit the sailing angle and sea condition. In general, during a hard beat when the boat sails very close to the wind, the running backstay is tightened to increase the tension of the forestay. The genoa is sheeted in. Under these conditions, the draft of the genoa is brought forward reducing the drag.
