= Solent (sailing rig) =

Type of sail and rigging system

A solent refers to a sail and rigging system on sailboats, typically sloops. Sailors, particularly British sailors, often refer to a 100% jib as a Solent, because its smaller size is preferable when sailing in the strong winds found in the Solent between the Isle of Wight and Britain. The common use of roller-furling headsails, or genoas, on modern cruising yachts allows the jib to be reduced in size, but partially-furled sails lack the efficiency of a sail that is actually cut to a smaller size. Accordingly, it is preferable to fly a separate, smaller jib—the solent—instead.

On a sloop, there is a single forestay that runs from the top of the mast forward to the prow, and in addition to bracing the mast it provides a firm support to which a jib can be attached. When this forestay is covered with a roller-furling jib, which cannot be quickly removed, it becomes impossible to attach a different sail to the same stay. For this reason, some boats are fitted with a "solent stay". A solent stay is a moveable stay that is fixed to the top of the mast just below the forestay. When needed to hold the solent sail, the stay is attached to a point just behind the forestay, where it is tensioned with a tackle or a Highfield lever. When not in use, it must be moved out of the way to allow the genoa to be deployed and tacked from side to side. It may be detached and secured just in front of the mast, or led to one side and fastened next to the shrouds.

A solent rig is different from a cutter rig, although a solent may serve the same purpose as the staysail on a cutter. A solent stay serves essentially as an alternative forestay when a roller-fuller prevents raising a different sail on the same line. On a cutter, the staysail stay is parallel to the forestay, but a significant distance behind and below it, allowing sails to be flown from both the forestay and the staysail stay at the same time. Since a staysail on a cutter does not run all the way to the mast-top, it may cause bend in the mast unless the pull is balanced by a running backstay.

A solent stay has additional uses. In strong winds roller-furling jibs do not perform well and may tend to unroll. Besides setting a solent sail as a 100% jib, it is possible to reef such a jib, or to set a storm sail on the solent stay.
