= General Dynamics F-16 Fighting Falcon =

American multi-role fighter aircraft

F-16 Fighting Falcon
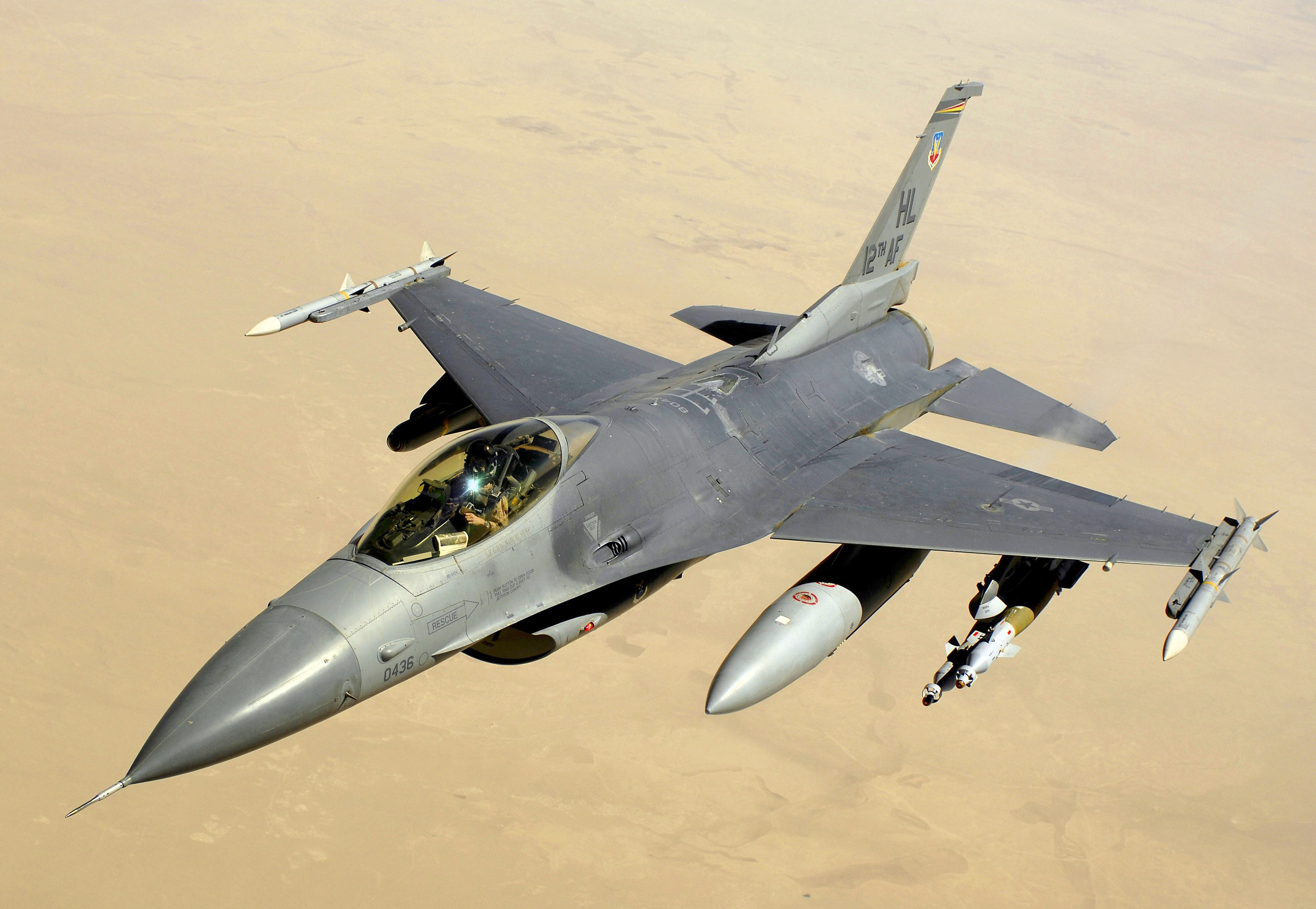
- A USAF F-16C over the desert in Iraq, 2008

General information
- Type: Multirole fighter, air superiority fighter
- National origin: United States
- Manufacturer: General Dynamics (1974–1993); Lockheed Corporation (1993–1995); Lockheed Martin (1995–2017, 2019-present)
- Built by: SABCA (1979–1985); Fokker (1979–1982); KAI (1994–2004); TUSAŞ (1987–2011)
- Status: In service
- Primary users: United States Air Force 25 other users (see operators page)
- Number built: 4,604

History
- Manufactured: 1973–2017, 2019–present
- Introduction date: 17 August 1978; 48 years ago
- First flight: 20 January 1974; 52 years ago (unplanned); 2 February 1974; 52 years ago (official)
- Variant: General Dynamics X-62 VISTA
- Developed into: Vought Model 1600; General Dynamics F-16XL; Mitsubishi F-2; Lockheed Martin F-16V Viper

The General Dynamics (now Lockheed Martin) F-16 Fighting Falcon is an American single-engine supersonic multirole fourth-generation fighter aircraft developed by General Dynamics and produced by multiple companies, including General Dynamics until 1993 and Lockheed Martin since. Designed as an air superiority day fighter, it evolved into a successful all-weather multirole aircraft with over 4,600 built since 1976.

The aircraft was first developed by General Dynamics in 1974. In 1993, General Dynamics sold its aircraft manufacturing business to Lockheed, which became part of Lockheed Martin after a 1995 merger with Martin Marietta. The F-16's key features include a frameless bubble canopy for enhanced cockpit visibility, a side-stick to ease control while maneuvering, an ejection seat reclined 30 degrees from vertical to reduce the effect of g-forces on the pilot, and the first use of a relaxed static stability/fly-by-wire flight control system that helps to make it an agile aircraft. The fighter has a single turbofan engine, an internal M61 Vulcan cannon and 11 hardpoints. Although officially named "Fighting Falcon", the aircraft is commonly known by the nickname "Viper" among its crews and pilots.

Since its introduction in 1978, the F-16 became a mainstay of the U.S. Air Force's tactical airpower, where it mainly replaced the F-105 Thunderchief, A-7 Corsair II, and F-4 Phantom II. The F-16 primarily performed strike and suppression of enemy air defenses (SEAD) missions, and in the latter role, it replaced the F-4G Wild Weasel by 1996. In addition to active duty in the U.S. Air Force, Air Force Reserve Command, and Air National Guard units, the aircraft is also used by the U.S. Air Force Thunderbirds aerial demonstration team, the US Air Combat Command F-16 Viper Demonstration Team, and as an adversary/aggressor aircraft by the United States Navy. The F-16 has also been procured by the air forces of 25 other nations. F-16s from various US-led coalitions flew combat missions in the Gulf War, Bosnia, Yugoslavia, Afghanistan, Libya, and Iraq and Syria. F-16s have also seen extensive combat use by Israel, Pakistan, and Ukraine. Since 1982, it has been a Dual Capable Aircraft platform for US nuclear weapons in Europe. Numerous countries have begun replacing the aircraft with the Lockheed Martin F-35 Lightning II and F-16V Viper, although the original versions of F-16 also remain in service with many operators.

Although the original versions are no longer in production, improved versions of the F-16V Viper family are being built and upgraded for export in a new production facility of Lockheed Martin. As of 2026, it is the world's most common fixed-wing aircraft in military service, with approximately 2,102 from the F-16 family operational, comprising 15% of all active combat aircraft.

== Development ==
=== Lightweight Fighter program ===
US Vietnam War experience showed the need for air superiority fighters and better air-to-air training for fighter pilots. Based on his experience in the Korean War and as a fighter tactics instructor in the early 1960s, Colonel John Boyd with mathematician Thomas Christie developed the energy–maneuverability theory to model a fighter aircraft's performance in combat. Boyd's work called for a small, lightweight aircraft that could maneuver with the minimum possible energy loss and which also incorporated an increased thrust-to-weight ratio. In the late 1960s, Boyd gathered a group of like-minded innovators who became known as the Fighter Mafia, and in 1969, they secured Department of Defense funding for General Dynamics and Northrop to study design concepts based on the theory.

Air Force F-X proponents were opposed to the concept because they perceived it as a threat to the F-15 program, but the USAF's leadership understood that its budget would not allow it to purchase enough F-15 aircraft to satisfy all of its missions. The Advanced Day Fighter concept, renamed F-XX, gained civilian political support under the reform-minded Deputy Secretary of Defense David Packard, who favored the idea of competitive prototyping. As a result, in May 1971, the Air Force Prototype Study Group was established, with Boyd a key member, and two of its six proposals would be funded, one being the Lightweight Fighter (LWF). The request for proposals issued on 6 January 1972 called for a 20,000-pound (9,100 kg) class air-to-air day fighter with a good turn rate, acceleration, and range, and optimized for combat at speeds of Mach 0.6–1.6 and altitudes of 30,000–40,000 feet (9,100–12,000 m). This was the region where USAF studies predicted most future air combat would occur. The anticipated average flyaway cost of a production version was $3 million. This production plan was hypothetical as the USAF had no firm plans to procure the winner.

==== Selection of finalists and flyoff ====
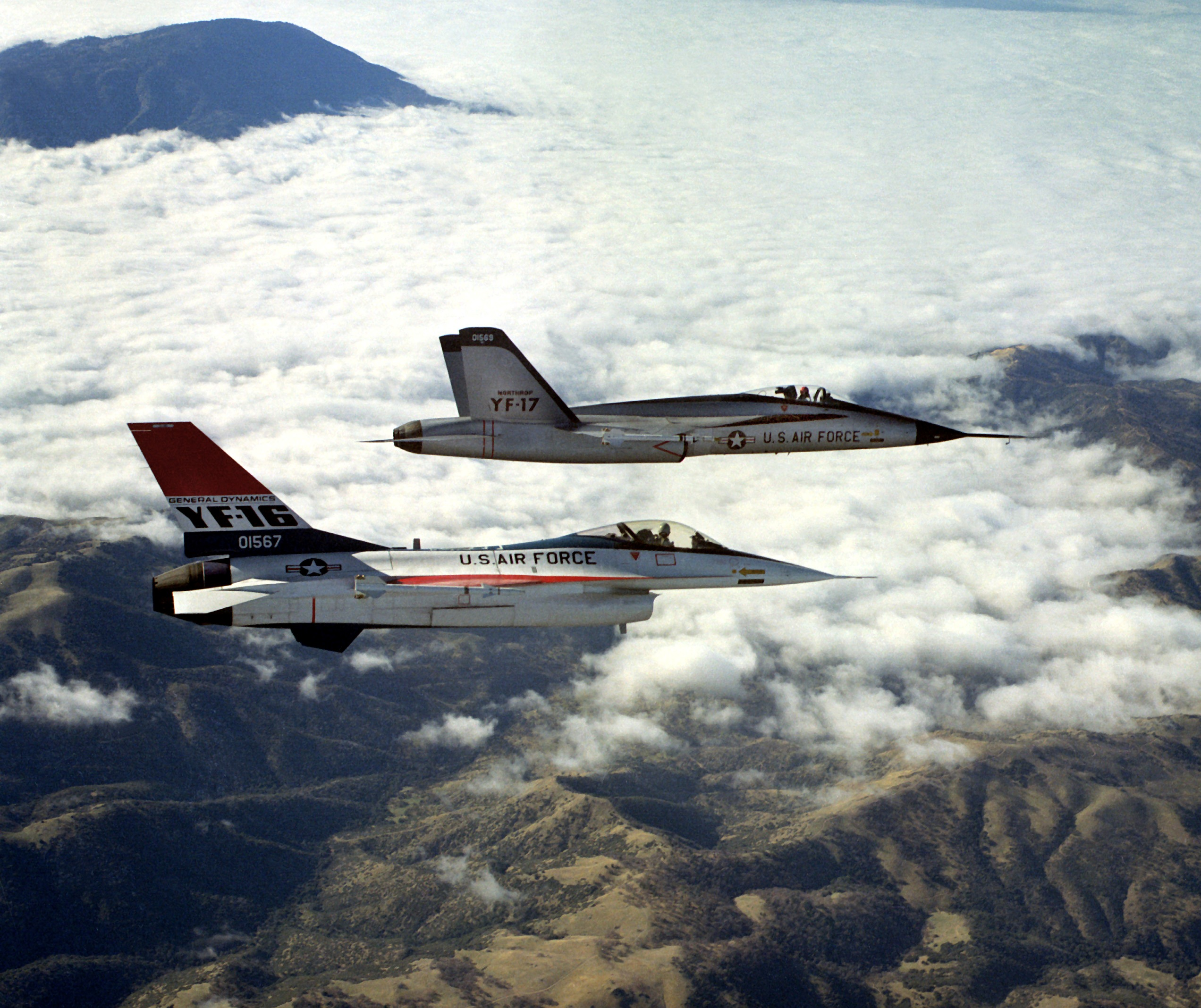
A right-side view of a YF-16 (foreground) and a Northrop YF-17, each armed with AIM-9 Sidewinder missiles

Five companies responded, and in 1972, the Air Staff selected General Dynamics' Model 401 and Northrop's P-600 for the follow-on prototype development and testing phase. GD and Northrop were awarded contracts worth $37.9 million and $39.8 million to produce the YF-16 and YF-17, respectively, with the first flights of both prototypes planned for early 1974. To overcome resistance in the Air Force hierarchy, the Fighter Mafia and other LWF proponents successfully advocated the idea of complementary fighters in a high-cost/low-cost force mix. The "high/low mix" would allow the USAF to be able to afford sufficient fighters for its overall fighter force structure requirements. The mix gained broad acceptance by the time of the prototypes' flyoff, defining the relationship between the LWF and the F-15.

The YF-16 was developed by a team of General Dynamics engineers led by Robert H. Widmer. The first YF-16 was rolled out on 13 December 1973. Its 90-minute maiden flight was made at the Air Force Flight Test Center at Edwards AFB, California, on 2 February 1974. Its actual first flight occurred accidentally during a high-speed taxi test on 20 January 1974. While gathering speed, a roll-control oscillation caused a fin of the port-side wingtip-mounted missile, and then the starboard stabilator to scrape the ground, and the aircraft then began to veer off the runway. The test pilot, Phil Oestricher, decided to lift off to avoid a potential crash, safely landing six minutes later. The slight damage was quickly repaired and the official first flight occurred on time. The YF-16's first supersonic flight was accomplished on 5 February 1974, and the second YF-16 prototype first flew on 9 May 1974. This was followed by the first flights of Northrop's YF-17 prototypes on 9 June and 21 August 1974, respectively. During the flyoff, the YF-16s completed 330 sorties for a total of 417 flight hours; the YF-17s flew 288 sorties, covering 345 hours. The YF-17 was later developed into the YF-18 for the Navy.

=== Air Combat Fighter competition ===
Increased interest turned the LWF into a serious acquisition program. NATO allies Belgium, Denmark, the Netherlands, and Norway were seeking to replace their F-104G Starfighter fighter-bombers. In early 1974, they reached an agreement with the U.S. that if the USAF ordered the LWF winner, they would consider ordering it as well. The USAF also needed to replace its F-105 Thunderchief and F-4 Phantom II fighter-bombers. The U.S. Congress sought greater commonality in fighter procurements by the Air Force and Navy, and in August 1974 redirected Navy funds to a new Navy Air Combat Fighter program that would be a naval fighter-bomber variant of the LWF. The four NATO allies had formed the Multinational Fighter Program Group (MFPG) and pressed for a U.S. decision by December 1974; thus, the USAF accelerated testing.

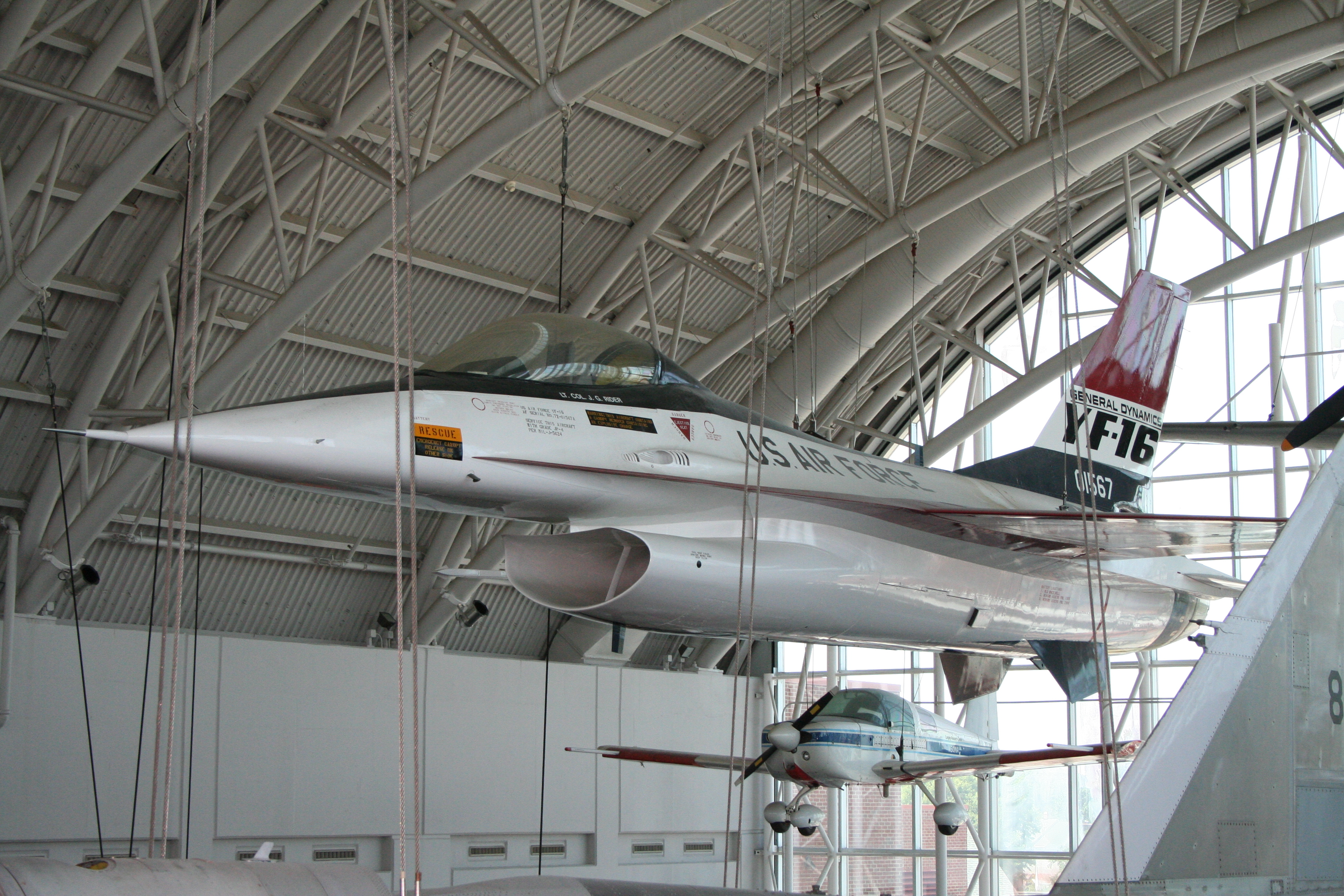
YF-16 on display at the Virginia Air and Space Center

To reflect this serious intent to procure a new fighter-bomber, the LWF program was rolled into a new Air Combat Fighter (ACF) competition in an announcement by U.S. Secretary of Defense James R. Schlesinger in April 1974. The ACF would not be a pure fighter, but multirole, and Schlesinger made it clear that any ACF order would be in addition to the F-15, which extinguished opposition to the LWF. ACF also raised the stakes for GD and Northrop because it brought in competitors intent on securing what was touted at the time as "the arms deal of the century". These were Dassault-Breguet's proposed Mirage F1M-53, the Anglo-French SEPECAT Jaguar, and the proposed Saab 37E "Eurofighter". Northrop offered the P-530 Cobra, which was similar to the YF-17. The Jaguar and Cobra were dropped by the MFPG early on, leaving two European and two U.S. candidates. On 11 September 1974, the U.S. Air Force confirmed plans to order the winning ACF design to equip five tactical fighter wings. Though computer modeling predicted a close contest, the YF-16 proved significantly quicker going from one maneuver to the next and was the unanimous choice of those pilots who flew both aircraft.

On 13 January 1975, Secretary of the Air Force John L. McLucas announced the YF-16 as the winner of the ACF competition. The chief reasons given by the secretary were the YF-16's lower operating costs, greater range, and maneuver performance that was "significantly better" than that of the YF-17, especially at supersonic speeds. Another advantage of the YF-16 – unlike the YF-17 – was its use of the Pratt & Whitney F100 turbofan engine, the same powerplant used by the F-15; such commonality would lower the cost of engines for both programs. Secretary McLucas announced that the USAF planned to order at least 650, possibly up to 1,400 production F-16s. In the Navy Air Combat Fighter competition, on 2 May 1975, the Navy selected the YF-17 over the YF-16 (in the form of the Vought Model 1600 proposal) as the basis for what would become the McDonnell Douglas F/A-18 Hornet.

=== Production ===
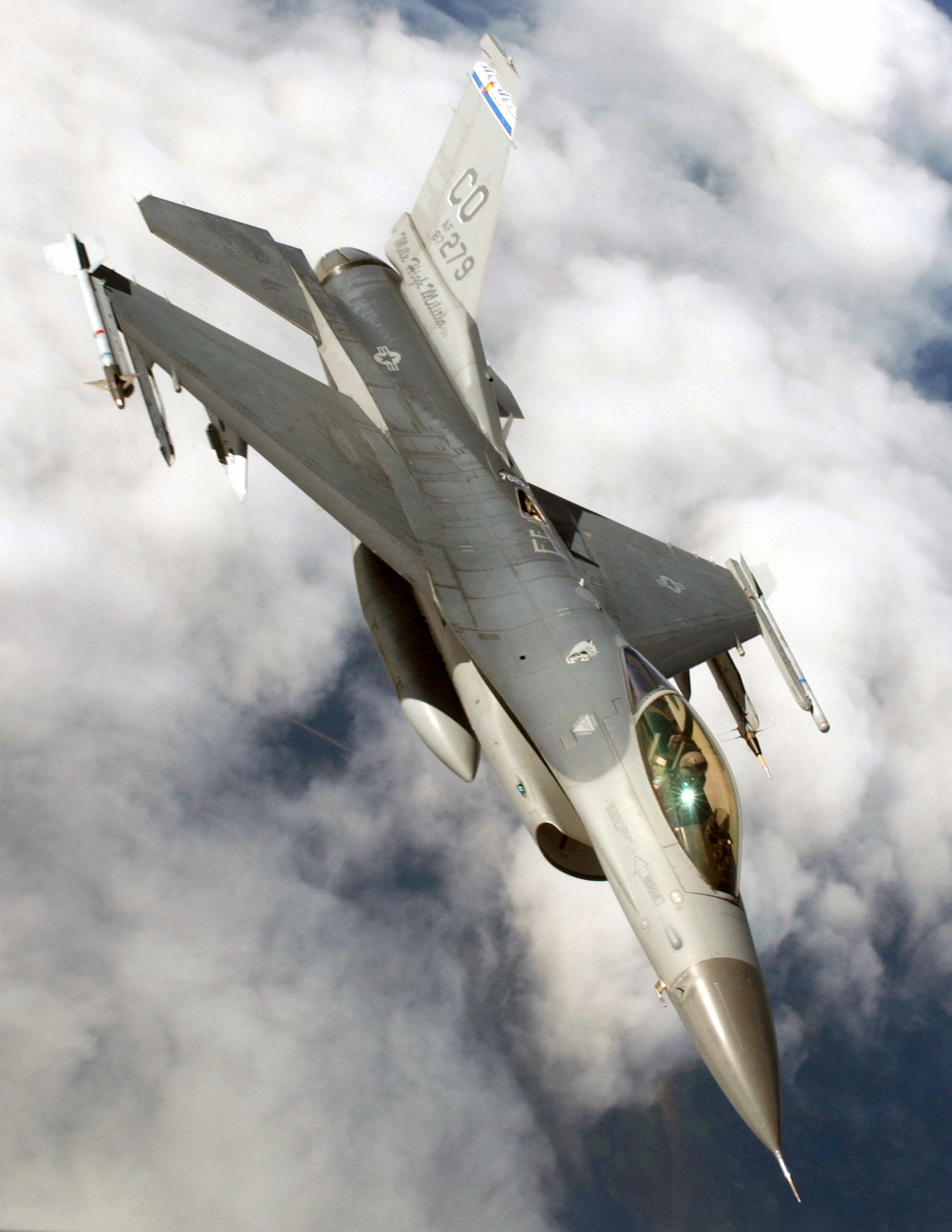
An F-16C of the Colorado Air National Guard with AIM-9 Sidewinder missiles, an Air Combat Maneuvering Instrumentation pod, and a centerline fuel tank (300 US gal or 1,100 L capacity)

The U.S. Air Force initially ordered 15 full-scale development (FSD) aircraft (11 single-seat and four two-seat models) for its flight test program which was reduced to eight (six F-16A single-seaters and two F-16B two-seaters). The YF-16 design was altered for the production F-16. The fuselage was lengthened by 10.6 in (0.269 m), a larger nose radome was fitted for the AN/APG-66 radar, wing area was increased from 280 to 300 sq ft (26 to 28 m^{2}), the tailfin height was decreased, the ventral fins were enlarged, two more stores stations were added, and a single door replaced the original nosewheel double doors. The F-16's weight was increased by 25% over the YF-16 by these modifications.

The FSD F-16s were manufactured by General Dynamics in Fort Worth, Texas, at United States Air Force Plant 4 in late 1975; the first F-16A rolled out on 20 October 1976 and first flew on 8 December. The initial two-seat model achieved its first flight on 8 August 1977. The initial production-standard F-16A flew for the first time on 7 August 1978 and its delivery was accepted by the USAF on 6 January 1979. The aircraft entered USAF operational service with the 34th Tactical Fighter Squadron, 388th Tactical Fighter Wing, at Hill AFB in Utah, on 1 October 1980.

The F-16 was given its name of "Fighting Falcon" on 21 July 1980. Its pilots and crews often use the name "Viper" instead, because of a perceived resemblance to a viper snake as well as to the fictional Colonial Viper starfighter from the television program Battlestar Galactica, which aired at the time the F-16 entered service.

On 7 June 1975, the four European partners, now known as the European Participation Group, signed up for 348 aircraft at the Paris Air Show. This was split among the European Participation Air Forces (EPAF) as 116 for Belgium, 58 for Denmark, 102 for the Netherlands, and 72 for Norway. Two European production lines, one in the Netherlands at Fokker's Schiphol-Oost facility and the other at SABCA's Gosselies plant in Belgium, would produce 184 and 164 units respectively. Norway's Kongsberg Vaapenfabrikk and Denmark's Terma A/S also manufactured parts and subassemblies for EPAF aircraft. European co-production was officially launched on 1 July 1977 at the Fokker factory. Beginning in November 1977, Fokker-produced components were sent to Fort Worth for fuselage assembly, then shipped back to Europe for final assembly of EPAF aircraft at the Belgian plant on 15 February 1978; deliveries to the Belgian Air Force began in January 1979. The first Royal Netherlands Air Force aircraft was delivered in June 1979. In 1980, the first aircraft were delivered to the Royal Norwegian Air Force by Fokker and to the Royal Danish Air Force by SABCA.

During the late 1980s and 1990s, Turkish Aerospace Industries (TAI) produced 232 Block 30/40/50 F-16s on a production line in Ankara under license for the Turkish Air Force. TAI also produced 46 Block 40s for Egypt in the mid-1990s and 30 Block 50s from 2010 onwards. Korean Aerospace Industries opened a production line for the KF-16 program, producing 140 Block 52s from the mid-1990s to mid-2000s (decade). If India had selected the F-16IN for its Medium Multi-Role Combat Aircraft procurement, a sixth F-16 production line would have been built in India. In May 2013, Lockheed Martin stated there were currently enough orders to keep producing the F-16 until 2017.

=== Improvements and upgrades ===
One change made during production was augmented pitch control to avoid deep stall conditions at high angles of attack. The stall issue had been raised during development but had originally been discounted. Model tests of the YF-16 conducted by the Langley Research Center revealed a potential problem, but no other laboratory was able to duplicate it. YF-16 flight tests were not sufficient to expose the issue; later flight testing on the FSD aircraft demonstrated a real concern. In response, the area of each horizontal stabilizer was increased by 25% on the Block 15 aircraft in 1981 and later retrofitted to earlier aircraft. In addition, a manual override switch to disable the horizontal stabilizer flight limiter was prominently placed on the control console, allowing the pilot to regain control of the horizontal stabilizers (which the flight limiters otherwise lock in place) and recover. Besides reducing the risk of deep stalls, the larger horizontal tail also improved stability and permitted faster takeoff rotation.

In the 1980s, the Multinational Staged Improvement Program (MSIP) was conducted to evolve the F-16's capabilities, mitigate risks during technology development, and ensure the aircraft's worth. The program upgraded the F-16 in three stages. The MSIP process permitted the quick introduction of new capabilities, at lower costs and with reduced risks compared to traditional independent upgrade programs. In 2012, the USAF had allocated $2.8 billion (~$3.88 billion in 2025) to upgrade 350 F-16s while waiting for the F-35 to enter service. One key upgrade has been an auto-GCAS (ground collision avoidance system) to reduce instances of controlled flight into terrain. Onboard power and cooling capacities limit the scope of upgrades, which often involve the addition of more power-hungry avionics.

Lockheed won many contracts to upgrade foreign operators' F-16s. BAE Systems also offers various F-16 upgrades, receiving orders from South Korea, Oman, Turkey, and the US Air National Guard; BAE lost the South Korean contract because of a price breach in November 2014. In 2012, the USAF assigned the total upgrade contract to Lockheed Martin. Upgrades include Raytheon's Center Display Unit, which replaces several analog flight instruments with a single digital display.

In 2013, sequestration budget cuts cast doubt on the USAF's ability to complete the Combat Avionics Programmed Extension Suite (CAPES), a part of secondary programs such as Taiwan's F-16 upgrade. Air Combat Command's General Mike Hostage stated that if he only had money for a service life extension program (SLEP) or CAPES, he would fund SLEP to keep the aircraft flying. Lockheed Martin responded to talk of CAPES cancellation with a fixed-price upgrade package for foreign users. CAPES was not included in the Pentagon's 2015 budget request. The USAF said that the upgrade package will still be offered to Taiwan's Republic of China Air Force, and Lockheed said that some common elements with the F-35 will keep the radar's unit costs down. In 2014, the USAF issued a RFI to SLEP 300 F-16 C/Ds.

=== Production relocation ===
To make more room for assembly of its newer F-35 Lightning II fighter aircraft, Lockheed Martin moved the F-16 production from Fort Worth, Texas to its plant in Greenville, South Carolina. Lockheed delivered the last F-16 from Fort Worth to the Iraqi Air Force on 14 November 2017, ending 40 years of F-16 production there. The company started serial production of the Lockheed Martin F-16V Viper in 2019, though engineering and modernization work will remain in Fort Worth. A gap in orders made it possible to stop production during the move; after completing orders for the last Iraqi purchase, the company was negotiating an F-16 sale to Bahrain that would be produced in Greenville. This contract was signed in June 2018, and the first planes rolled off the Greenville line in 2023.

Tata Advanced Systems (TASL) and Lockheed Martin signed an agreement to produce F-16 wings in India on 4 September 2018. The production of wings was "not contingent" of the Indian Air Force selecting the F-16 for the MRCA programme. The wing prototype made in the Hyderabad facility of Tata–Lockheed Martin Aerostructures Limited (TLMAL) was delivered and certified in December 2021, paving way for the facility to be the sole provider of F-16 wings to Lockheed Martin. The wings were described as "a fuel-carrying 9-g, 12,000-hour, interchangeable and replaceable fighter wing". The same facility is also the sole producer of empennages of C-130J at a rate of 24 units per year and produced 250 units by December 2025. Lockheed and the Tata Group reached an agreement on a production order for 29 wing sets of F-16s in the facility with options for additional quantities in March 2023. The order was being executed in December 2025.

== Design ==
=== Overview ===
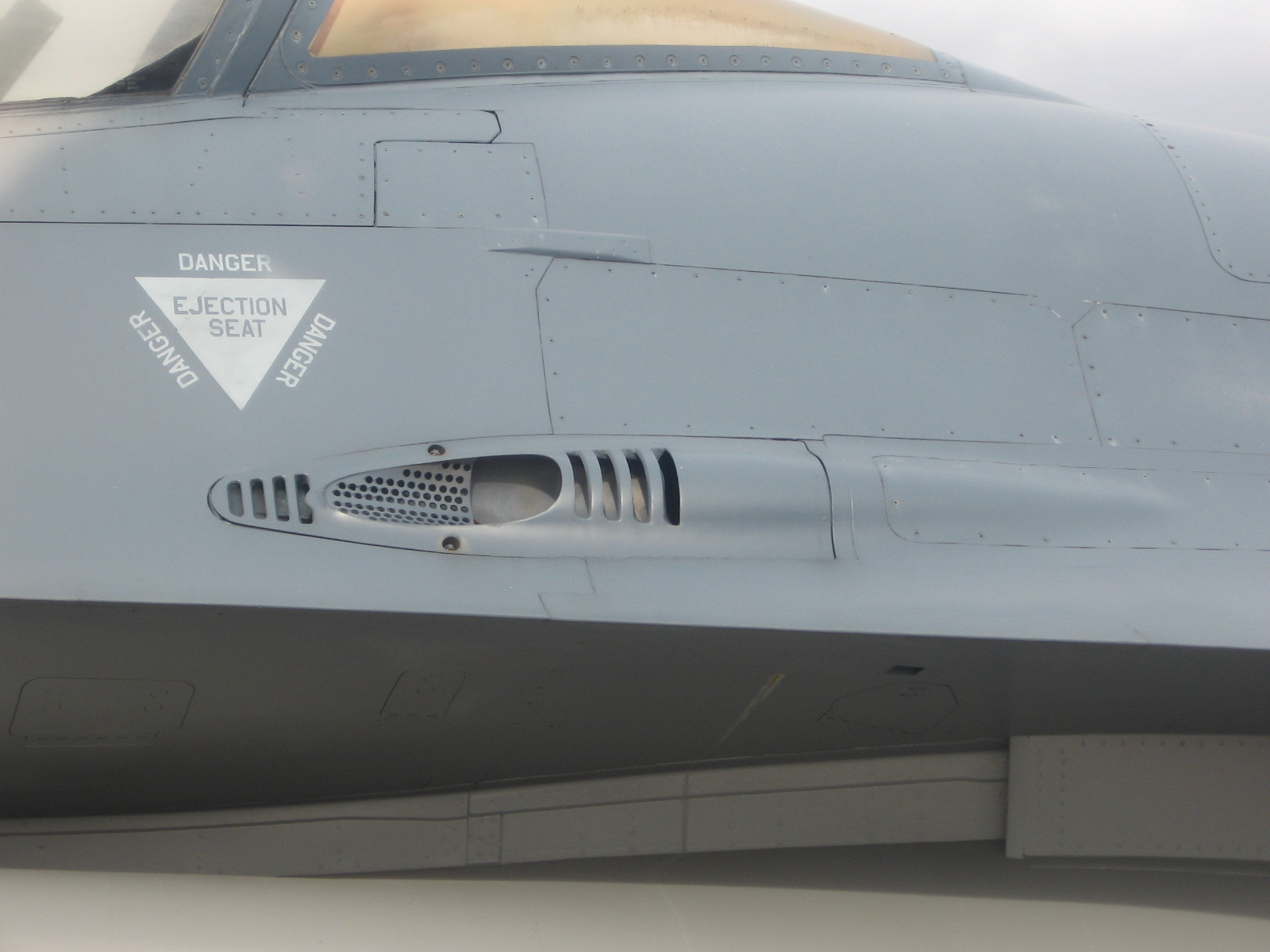
Early

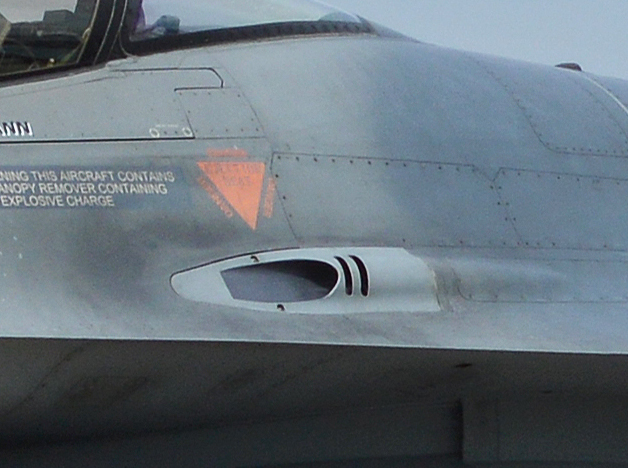
Late

Comparison between F-16's inset cannon; early aircraft had four leading vents, a grille, and four trailing vents, while later aircraft had only two trailing vents

The F-16 is a single-engine, highly maneuverable, supersonic, multirole tactical fighter aircraft. It is much smaller and lighter than its predecessors but uses advanced aerodynamics and avionics, including the first use of a relaxed static stability/fly-by-wire (RSS/FBW) flight control system, to achieve enhanced maneuver performance. Highly agile, the F-16 was the first fighter aircraft purpose-built to pull 9-g maneuvers and can reach a maximum speed of over Mach 2. Innovations include a frameless bubble canopy for better visibility, a side-mounted control stick, and a reclined seat to reduce g-force effects on the pilot. It is armed with an internal 20 mm M61 Vulcan cannon in the left wing root and has multiple locations for mounting various missiles, bombs and pods. It has a thrust-to-weight ratio greater than one, providing power to climb and vertical acceleration.

The F-16 was designed to be relatively inexpensive to build and simpler to maintain than earlier-generation fighters. The airframe is built with about 80% aviation-grade aluminum alloys, 8% steel, 3% composites, and 1.5% titanium. The leading-edge flaps, stabilators, and ventral fins make use of bonded aluminum honeycomb structures and graphite epoxy lamination coatings. The number of lubrication points, fuel line connections, and replaceable modules is significantly less than in preceding fighters; 80% of the access panels can be accessed without stands. The air intake was placed so it was rearward of the nose but forward enough to minimize air flow losses and reduce aerodynamic drag.

Although the LWF program called for a structural life of 4,000 flight hours, capable of achieving 7.33-g with 80% internal fuel; GD's engineers decided to design the F-16's airframe life for 8,000 hours and for 9-g maneuvers on full internal fuel. This proved advantageous when the aircraft's mission changed from solely air-to-air combat to multirole operations. Changes in operational use and additional systems have increased weight, necessitating multiple structural strengthening programs.

=== General configuration ===
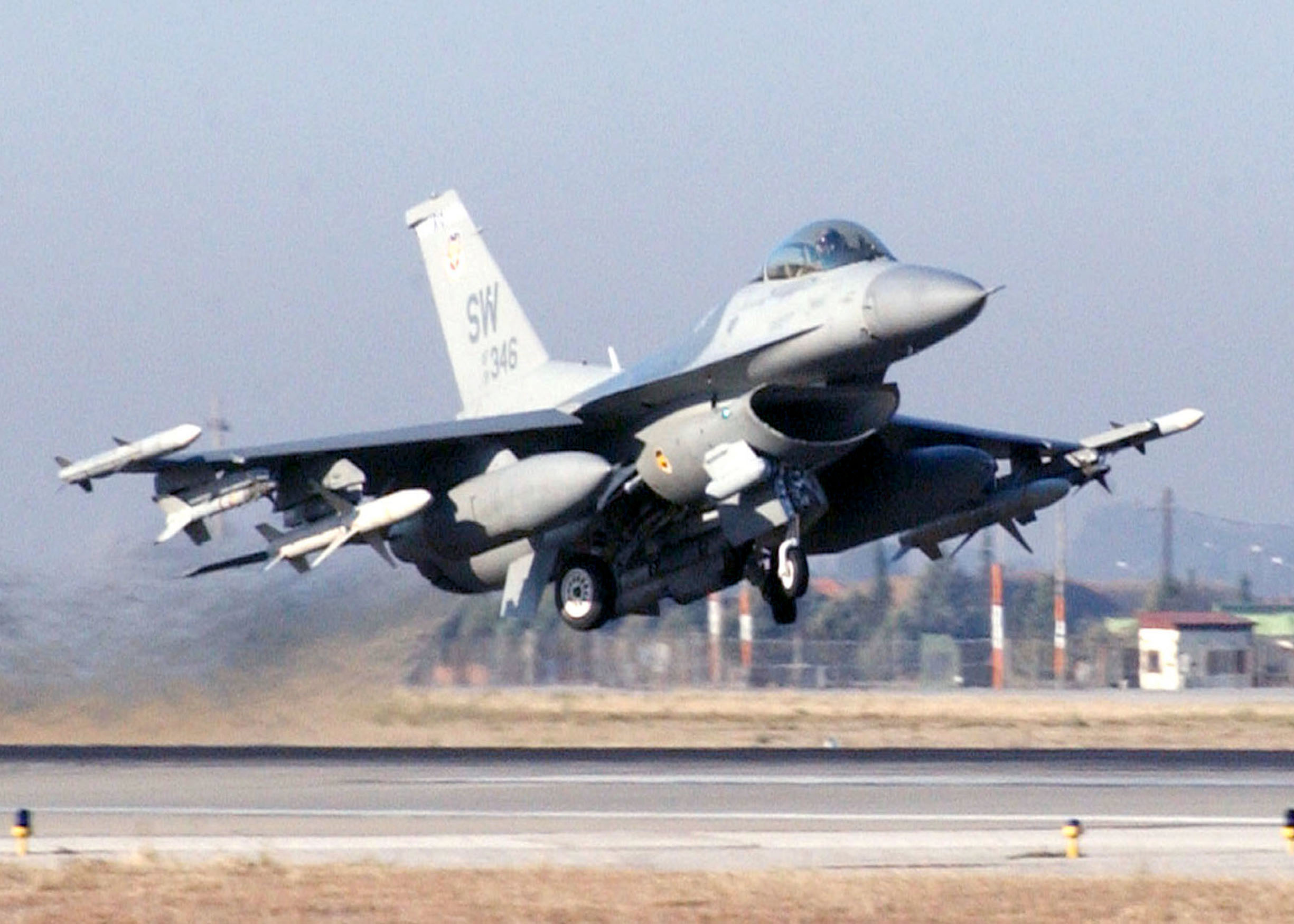
F-16CJ of the 20th Fighter Wing from Shaw AFB, South Carolina, armed with a mix of air-to-air missiles, anti-radiation missiles, external fuel tanks and support equipment

The F-16 has a cropped-delta wing incorporating wing-fuselage blending and forebody vortex-control strakes; a fixed-geometry, underslung air intake (with splitter plate) to the single turbofan jet engine; a conventional tri-plane empennage arrangement with all-moving horizontal "stabilator" tailplanes; a pair of ventral fins beneath the fuselage aft of the wing's trailing edge; and a tricycle landing gear configuration with the aft-retracting, steerable nose gear deploying a short distance behind the inlet lip. The fixed-geometry pitot-type intake is lighter and simpler than variable-geometry designs, at the expense of pressure recovery performance at higher Mach numbers; the designers considered this a worthwhile tradeoff for an aircraft maneuvering primarily at subsonic and transonic speeds. There is a boom-style aerial refueling receptacle located behind the single-piece "bubble" canopy of the cockpit. Split-flap speedbrakes are located at the aft end of the wing-body fairing, and a tailhook is mounted underneath the fuselage. A fairing beneath the rudder often houses ECM equipment or a drag chute. Later F-16 models feature a long dorsal fairing along the fuselage's "spine", housing additional equipment or fuel.

Aerodynamic studies in the 1960s demonstrated that the "vortex lift" phenomenon could be harnessed by highly swept wing configurations to reach higher angles of attack, using leading edge vortex flow off a slender lifting surface. As the F-16 was being optimized for high combat agility, GD's designers chose a slender cropped-delta wing with a leading-edge sweep of 40° and a straight trailing edge. To improve maneuverability, a variable-camber wing with a NACA 64A-204 airfoil was selected; the camber is adjusted by leading-edge and trailing edge flaperons linked to a digital flight control system regulating the flight envelope. The F-16 has a moderate wing loading, reduced by fuselage lift. The vortex lift effect is increased by leading-edge extensions, known as strakes. Strakes act as additional short-span, triangular wings running from the wing root (the junction with the fuselage) to a point further forward on the fuselage. Blended into the fuselage and along the wing root, the strake generates a high-speed vortex that remains attached to the top of the wing as the angle of attack increases, generating additional lift and allowing greater angles of attack without stalling. Strakes allow a smaller, lower-aspect-ratio wing, which increases roll rates and directional stability while decreasing weight. Deeper wing roots also increase structural strength and internal fuel volume.

=== Armament ===
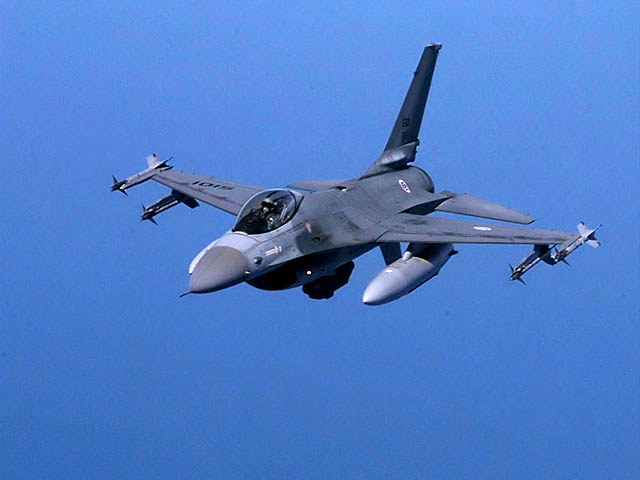
A Portuguese Air Force F-16A outfitted with AIM-9 Sidewinder missiles, AN/ALQ-131 ECM pod, and external fuel tanks

Early F-16s could be armed with up to six AIM-9 Sidewinder heat-seeking short-range air-to-air missiles (AAM) by employing rail launchers on each wingtip, as well as radar-guided AIM-7 Sparrow medium-range AAMs in a weapons mix. More recent versions support the AIM-120 AMRAAM, and US aircraft often mount that missile on their wingtips to reduce wing flutter. The aircraft can carry various other AAMs, a wide variety of air-to-ground missiles, rockets or bombs; electronic countermeasures (ECM), navigation, targeting or weapons pods; and fuel tanks on 9 hardpoints – six under the wings, two on wingtips, and one under the fuselage. Two other locations under the fuselage are available for sensor or radar pods. The F-16 carries a 20 mm (0.79 in) M61A1 Vulcan cannon, which is mounted inside the fuselage to the left of the cockpit.

=== Relaxed stability and fly-by-wire ===
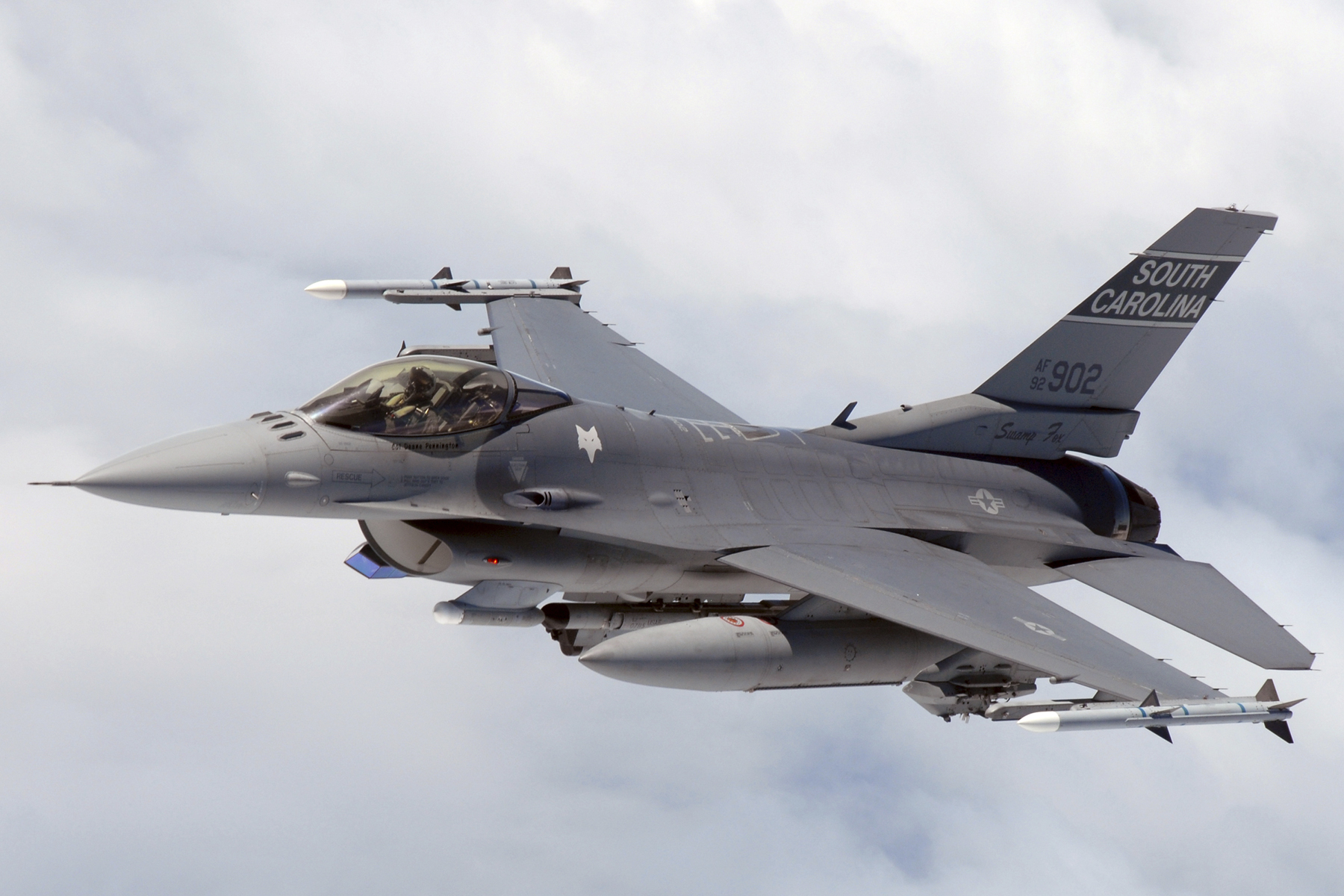
F-16CJ Block 52 of the South Carolina Air National Guard in-flight over North Carolina equipped with CATM-120 training missiles, TER-9/A Triple Ejector Racks, Sniper ATP, AN/ASQ-213 HARM Targeting System, and electronic countermeasures pods.

The F-16 is the first production fighter aircraft intentionally designed to be slightly aerodynamically unstable, also known as relaxed static stability (RSS), to both reduce drag and improve maneuverability. Most aircraft are designed to have positive static stability, which induces the aircraft to return to straight and level flight attitude if the pilot releases the controls. This reduces maneuverability as the inherent stability has to be overcome and increases a form of drag known as trim drag. Aircraft with relaxed stability are designed to be able to augment their stability characteristics while maneuvering to increase lift and reduce drag, thus greatly increasing their maneuverability. At Mach 1, the F-16 gains positive stability because of aerodynamic changes.

To counter the tendency to depart from controlled flight and avoid the need for constant trim inputs by the pilot, the F-16 has a quadruplex (four-channel) fly-by-wire (FBW) flight control system (FLCS). The flight control computer (FLCC) accepts pilot input from the stick and rudder controls and manipulates the control surfaces in such a way as to produce the desired result without inducing control loss. The FLCC conducts thousands of measurements per second on the aircraft's flight attitude to automatically counter deviations from the pilot-set flight path. The FLCC further incorporates limiters governing movement in the three main axes based on attitude, airspeed, and angle of attack (AOA)/g; these prevent control surfaces from inducing instability such as slips or skids, or a high AOA inducing a stall. The limiters also prevent maneuvers that would exert more than a 9-g load.

Flight testing revealed that "assaulting" multiple limiters at high AOA and low speed can result in an AOA far exceeding the 25° limit, colloquially referred to as "departing"; this causes a deep stall; a near-freefall at 50° to 60° AOA, either upright or inverted. While at a very high AOA, the aircraft's attitude is stable but control surfaces are ineffective. The pitch limiter locks the stabilators at an extreme pitch-up or pitch-down attempting to recover. This can be overridden so the pilot can "rock" the nose via pitch control to recover.

Unlike the YF-17, which had hydromechanical controls serving as a backup to the FBW, General Dynamics took the innovative step of eliminating mechanical linkages from the control stick and rudder pedals to the flight control surfaces. The F-16 is entirely reliant on its electrical systems to relay flight commands, instead of traditional mechanically linked controls, leading to the early moniker of "the electric jet" and aphorisms among pilots such as "You don't fly an F-16; it flies you." The quadruplex design permits "graceful degradation" in flight control response in that the loss of one channel renders the FLCS a "triplex" system. The FLCC began as an analog system on the A/B variants but has been supplanted by a digital computer system beginning with the F-16C/D Block 40. The F-16's controls suffered from a sensitivity to static electricity or electrostatic discharge (ESD) and lightning. Up to 70–80% of the C/D models' electronics were vulnerable to ESD.

=== Cockpit and ergonomics ===
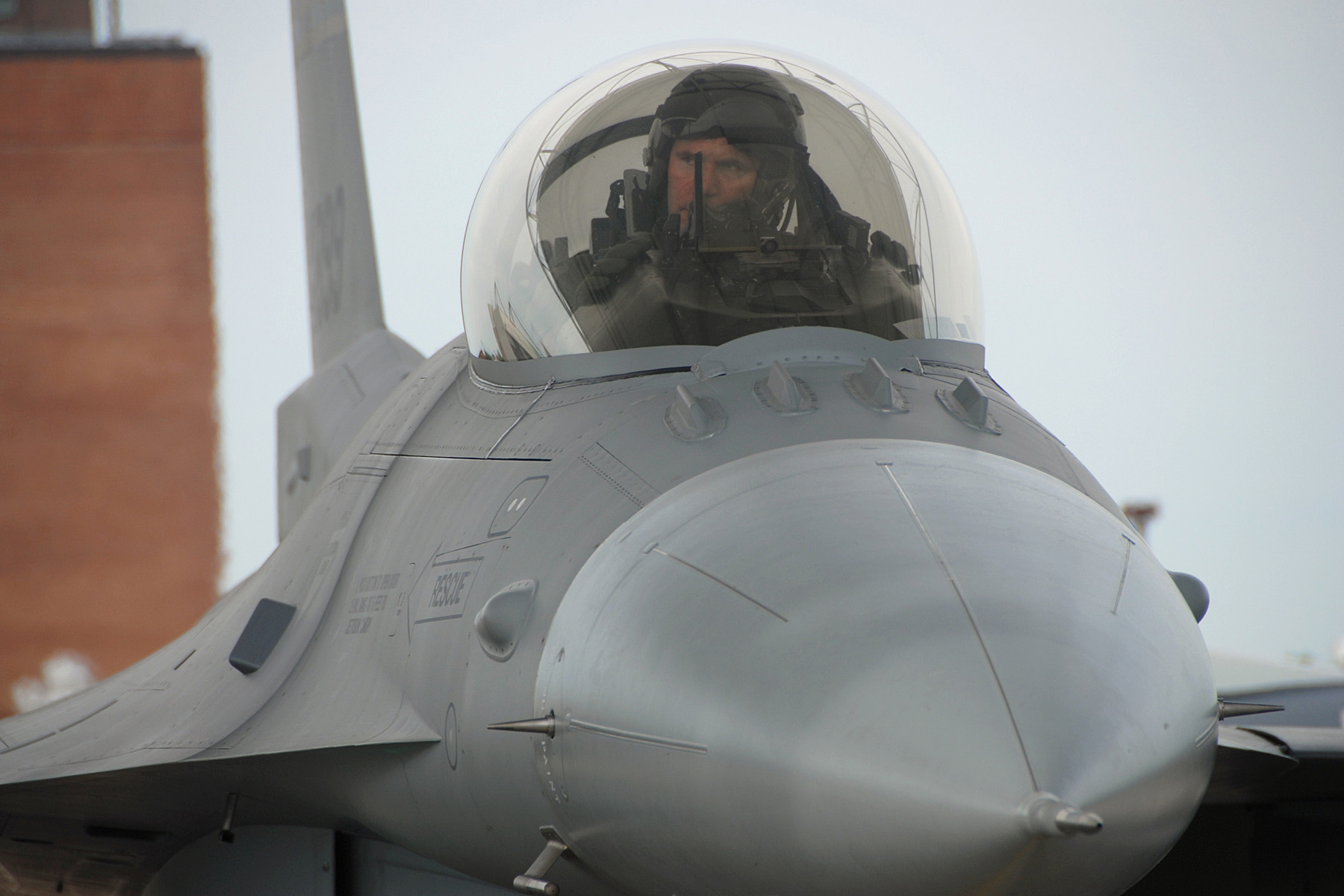
Bubble canopy, allowing all-round visibility

A key feature of the F-16's cockpit is the exceptional field of view. The single-piece, bird-proof polycarbonate bubble canopy provides 360° all-round visibility, with a 40° look-down angle over the side of the aircraft, and 15° down over the nose (compared to the common 12–13° of preceding aircraft); the pilot's seat is elevated for this purpose. Additionally, the F-16's canopy omits the forward bow frame found on many fighters, which is an obstruction to a pilot's forward vision. The F-16's ACES II zero/zero ejection seat is reclined at an unusual tilt-back angle of 30°; most fighters have a tilted seat at 13–15°. The tilted seat can accommodate taller pilots and increases g-force tolerance; however, it has been associated with reports of neck aches, possibly caused by incorrect headrest usage. Subsequent U.S. fighters have adopted more modest tilt-back angles of 20°. Because of the seat angle and the canopy's thickness, the ejection seat lacks canopy-breakers for emergency egress; instead the entire canopy is jettisoned prior to the seat's rocket firing.

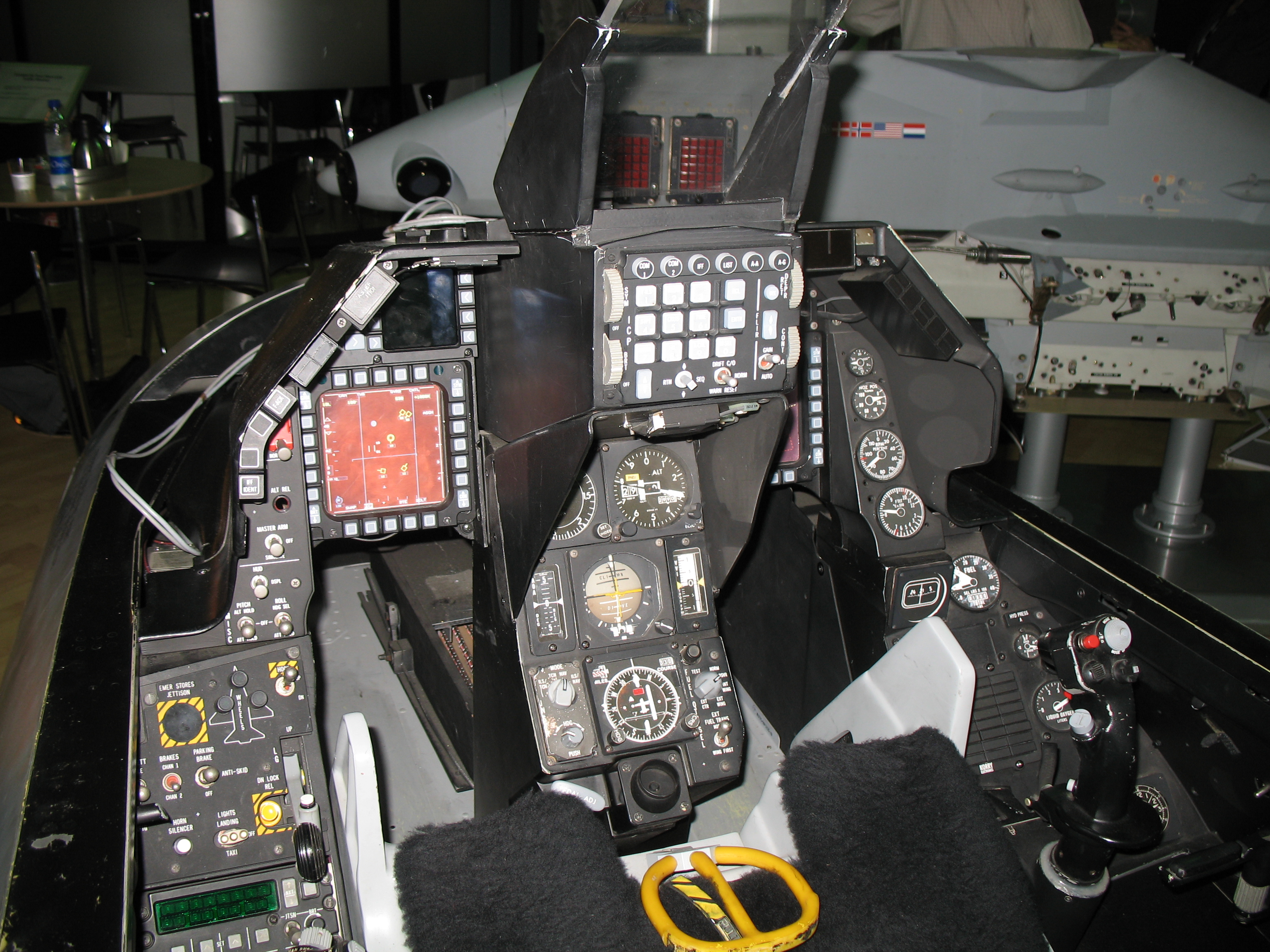
F-16 ground trainer cockpit (F-16 Mid-Life Update (MLU))

The pilot flies primarily by means of an armrest-mounted side-stick controller (instead of a traditional center-mounted stick) and an engine throttle; conventional rudder pedals are also employed. To enhance the pilot's degree of control of the aircraft during high-g combat maneuvers, various switches and function controls were moved to centralized hands on throttle-and-stick (HOTAS) controls upon both the controllers and the throttle. Hand pressure on the side-stick controller is transmitted by electrical signals via the FBW system to adjust various flight control surfaces to maneuver the F-16. Originally, the side-stick controller was non-moving, but this proved uncomfortable and difficult for pilots to adjust to, sometimes resulting in a tendency to "over-rotate" during takeoffs, so the control stick was given a small amount of "play". Since the introduction of the F-16, HOTAS controls have become a standard feature on modern fighters.

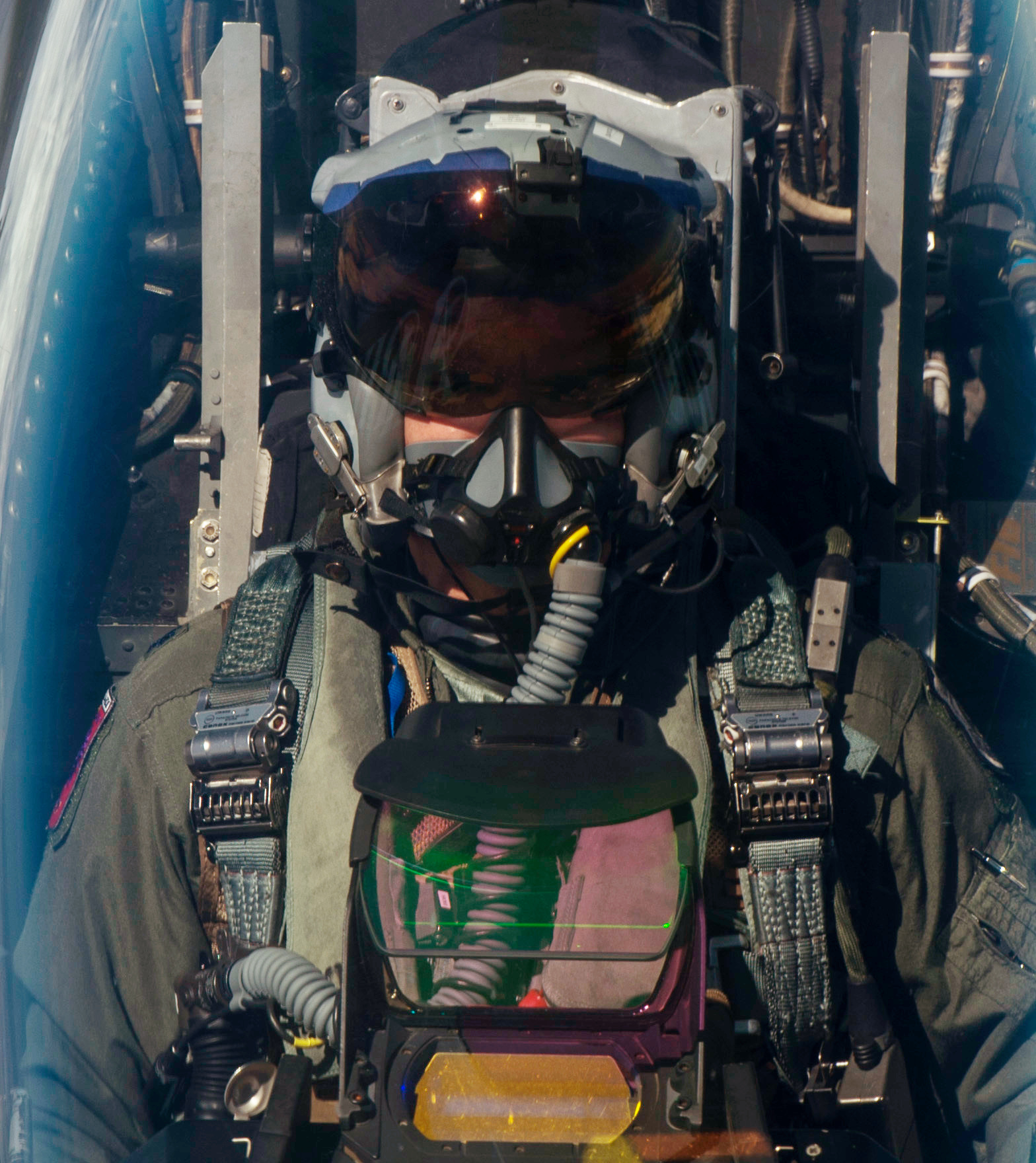
F-16 pilot with Joint Helmet Mounted Cueing System and cockpit head-up display

The F-16 has a head-up display (HUD), which projects visual flight and combat information in front of the pilot without obstructing the view; being able to keep their head "out of the cockpit" improves the pilot's situation awareness. Further flight and systems information are displayed on multi-function displays (MFD). The left-hand MFD is the primary flight display (PFD), typically showing radar and moving maps; the right-hand MFD is the system display (SD), presenting information about the engine, landing gear, slat and flap settings, and fuel and weapons status. Initially, the F-16A/B had monochrome cathode-ray tube (CRT) displays; replaced by color liquid-crystal displays on the Block 50/52. The Mid-Life Update (MLU) introduced compatibility with night-vision goggles (NVG). The Boeing Joint Helmet Mounted Cueing System (JHMCS) is available from Block 40 onwards for targeting based on where the pilot's head faces, unrestricted by the HUD, using high-off-boresight missiles like the AIM-9X. The newer Scorpion Helmet Mounted Display is also available and would later replace the JHMCS in U.S. service.

In November 2024 it was announced that the US Air Force had awarded a $9 million contract to Danish defense company Terma A/S, to supply its 3D audio system for the aircraft, with a program of upgrades over the following two years. The system will provide high-fidelity digital audio by spatially separating radio signals, aligning audio with threat directions, and integrating active noise reduction.

=== Fire-control radar ===
The F-16A/B was originally equipped with the Westinghouse AN/APG-66 fire-control radar. Its slotted planar array antenna was designed to be compact to fit into the F-16's relatively small nose. In uplook mode, the APG-66 uses a low pulse-repetition frequency (PRF) for medium- and high-altitude target detection in a low-clutter environment, and in look-down/shoot-down employs a medium PRF for heavy clutter environments. It has four operating frequencies within the X band, and provides four air-to-air and seven air-to-ground operating modes for combat, even at night or in bad weather. The Block 15's APG-66(V)2 model added more powerful signal processing, higher output power, improved reliability, and increased range in cluttered or jamming environments. The Mid-Life Update (MLU) program introduced a new model, APG-66(V)2A, which features higher speed and more memory.

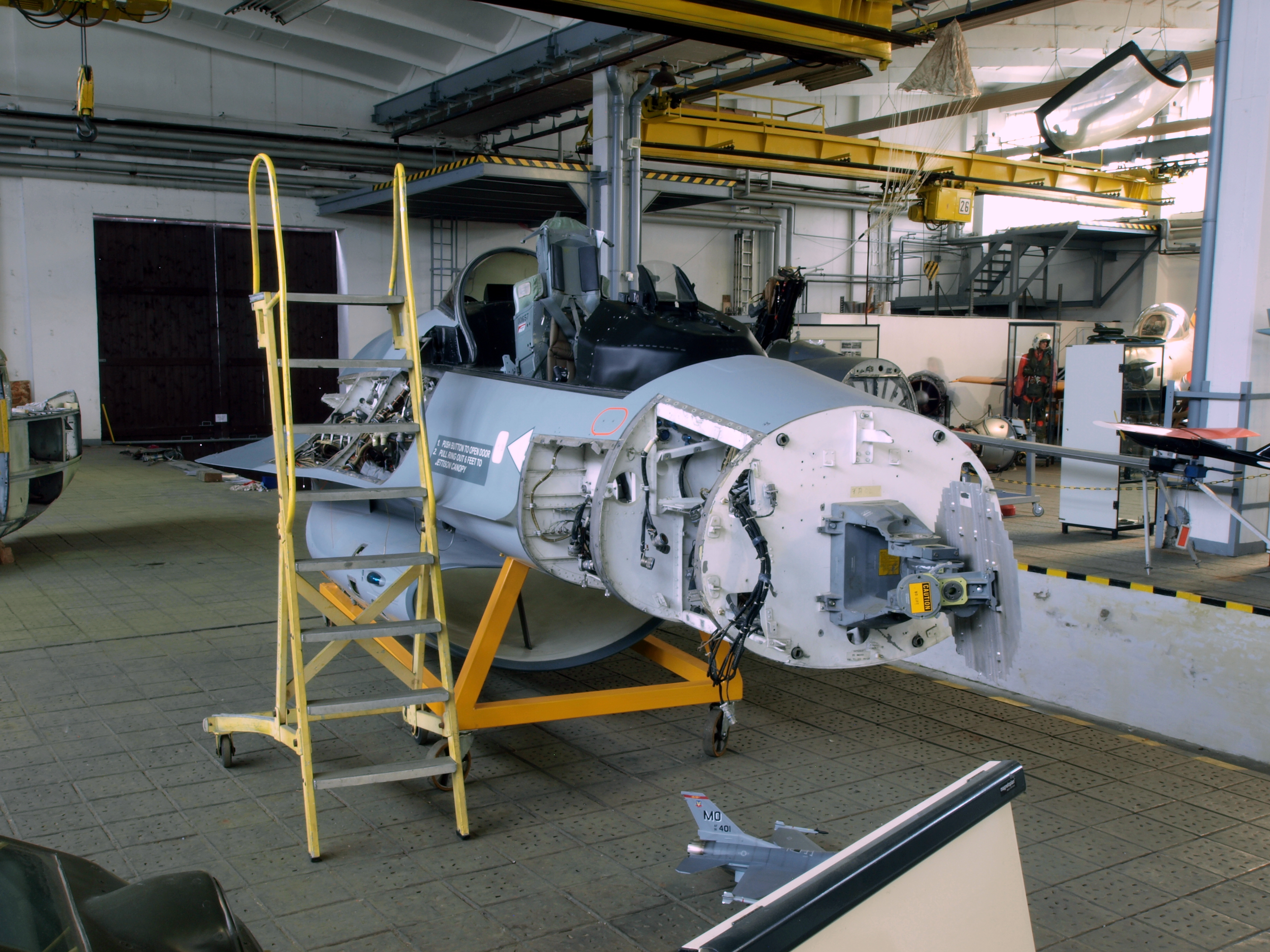
AN/APG-68, as fitted to the nose

The AN/APG-68, an evolution of the APG-66, was introduced with the F-16C/D Block 25. The APG-68 has greater range and resolution, as well as 25 operating modes, including ground-mapping, Doppler beam-sharpening, ground moving target indication, sea target, and track while scan (TWS) for up to 10 targets. The Block 40/42's APG-68(V)1 model added full compatibility with Lockheed Martin Low Altitude Navigation and Targeting Infrared for Night (LANTIRN) pods, and a high-PRF pulse-Doppler track mode to provide Interrupted Continuous Wave guidance for semi-active radar homing (SARH) missiles like the AIM-7 Sparrow. Block 50/52 F-16s initially used the more reliable APG-68(V)5 which has a programmable signal processor employing Very High Speed Integrated Circuit (VHSIC) technology. The Advanced Block 50/52 (or 50+/52+) is equipped with the APG-68(V)9 radar, with a 30% greater air-to-air detection range and a synthetic aperture radar (SAR) mode for high-resolution mapping and target detection-recognition. In August 2004, Northrop Grumman was contracted to upgrade the APG-68 radars of Block 40/42/50/52 aircraft to the (V)10 standard, providing all-weather autonomous detection and targeting for Global Positioning System (GPS)-aided precision weapons, SAR mapping, and terrain-following radar (TF) modes, as well as interleaving of all modes.

The F-16E/F is outfitted with Northrop Grumman's AN/APG-80 active electronically scanned array (AESA) radar. Northrop Grumman developed the latest AESA radar upgrade for the F-16 (selected for USAF and Taiwan's Republic of China Air Force F-16 upgrades), named the AN/APG-83 Scalable Agile Beam Radar (SABR). In July 2007, Raytheon announced that it was developing a Next Generation Radar (RANGR) based on its earlier AN/APG-79 AESA radar as a competitor to Northrop Grumman's AN/APG-68 and AN/APG-80 for the F-16. On 28 February 2020, Northrop Grumman received an order from USAF to extend the service lives of their F-16s to at least 2048 with AN/APG-83 as part of the service-life extension program (SLEP).

=== Propulsion ===
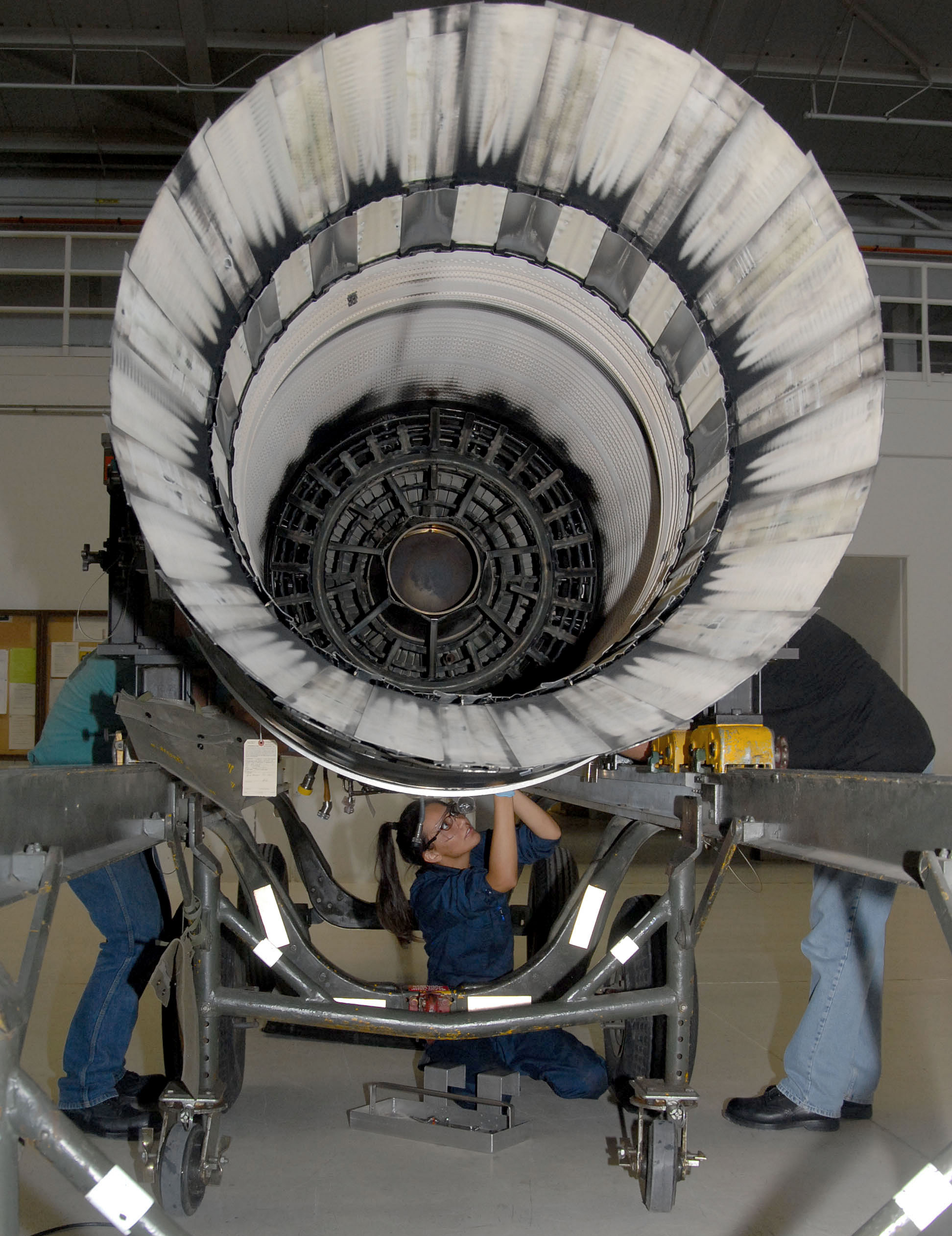
Afterburner – concentric ring structure inside the exhaust

The initial powerplant selected for the single-engined F-16 was the Pratt & Whitney F100-PW-200 afterburning turbofan, a modified version of the F-15's F100-PW-100, rated at 23,830 lbf (106.0 kN) thrust. During testing, the engine was found to be prone to compressor stalls and "rollbacks", wherein the engine's thrust would spontaneously reduce to idle. Until resolved, the Air Force ordered F-16s to be operated within "dead-stick landing" distance of its bases. It was the standard F-16 engine through the Block 25, except for the newly built Block 15s with the Operational Capability Upgrade (OCU). The OCU introduced the 23,770 lbf (105.7 kN) F100-PW-220, later installed on Block 32 and 42 aircraft: the main advance being a Digital Electronic Engine Control (DEEC) unit, which improved reliability and reduced stall occurrence. Beginning production in 1988, the "-220" also supplanted the F-15's "-100", for commonality. Many of the "-220" engines on Block 25 and later aircraft were upgraded from 1997 onwards to the "-220E" standard, which enhanced reliability and maintainability; unscheduled engine removals were reduced by 35%.

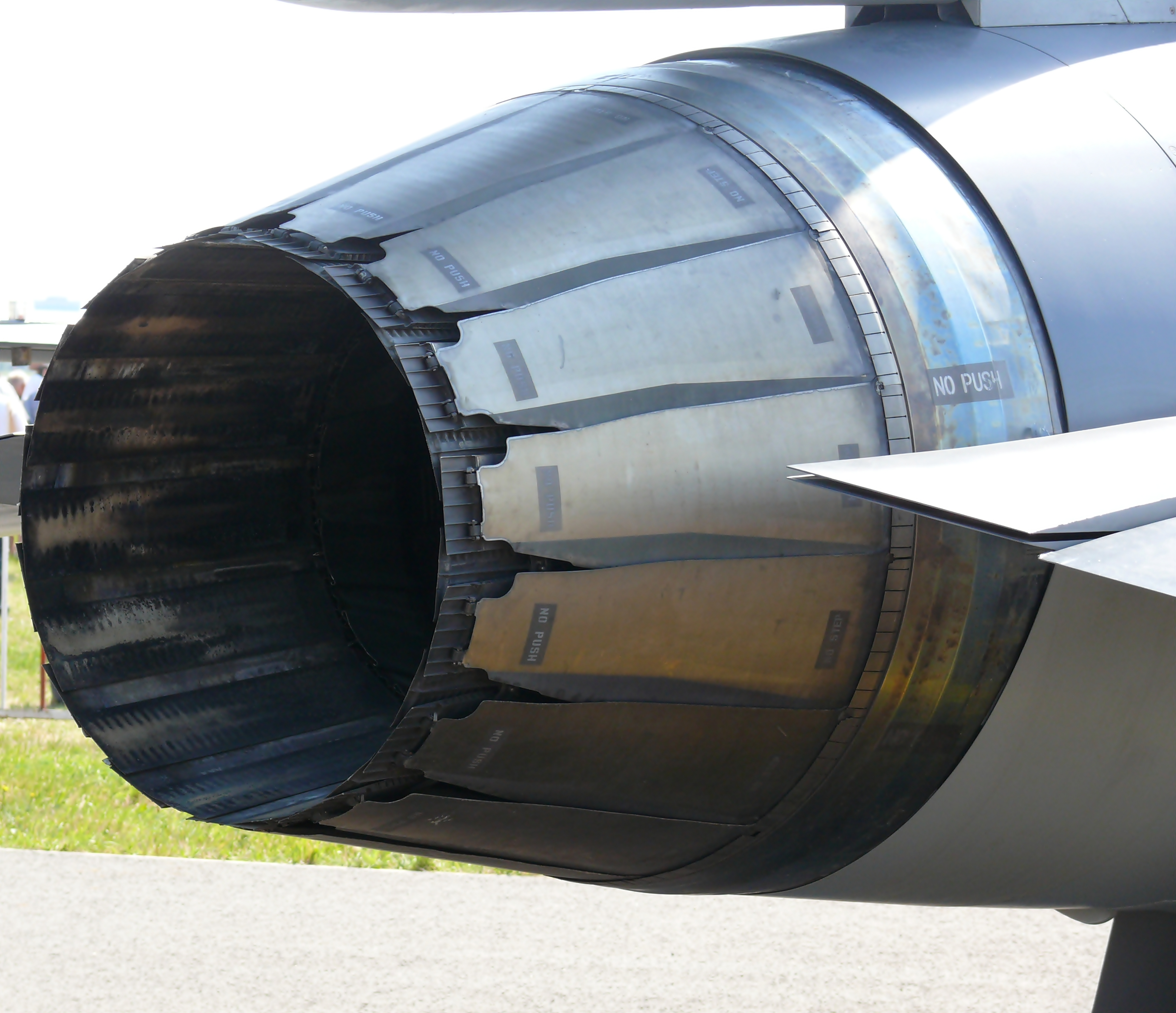
Adjustable exhaust nozzle in contracted position

The F100-PW-220/220E was the result of the USAF's Alternate Fighter Engine (AFE) program (colloquially known as "the Great Engine War"), which also saw the entry of General Electric as an F-16 engine provider. Its F110-GE-100 turbofan was limited by the original inlet to a thrust of 25,735 lbf (114.47 kN), the Modular Common Inlet Duct allowed the F110 to achieve its maximum thrust of 28,984 lbf (128.93 kN). (To distinguish between aircraft equipped with these two engines and inlets, from the Block 30 series on, blocks ending in "0" (e.g., Block 30) are powered by GE, and blocks ending in "2" (e.g., Block 32) are fitted with Pratt & Whitney engines.)

The Increased Performance Engine (IPE) program led to the 29,588 lbf (131.61 kN) F110-GE-129 on the Block 50 and 29,160 lbf (129.7 kN) F100-PW-229 on the Block 52. F-16s began flying with these IPE engines in the early 1990s. Altogether, of the 1,446 F-16C/Ds ordered by the USAF, 556 were fitted with F100-series engines and 890 with F110s. The United Arab Emirates' Block 60 is powered by the General Electric F110-GE-132 turbofan with a maximum thrust of 32,500 lbf (145 kN), the highest thrust engine developed for the F-16.

== Operational history ==
=== United States ===
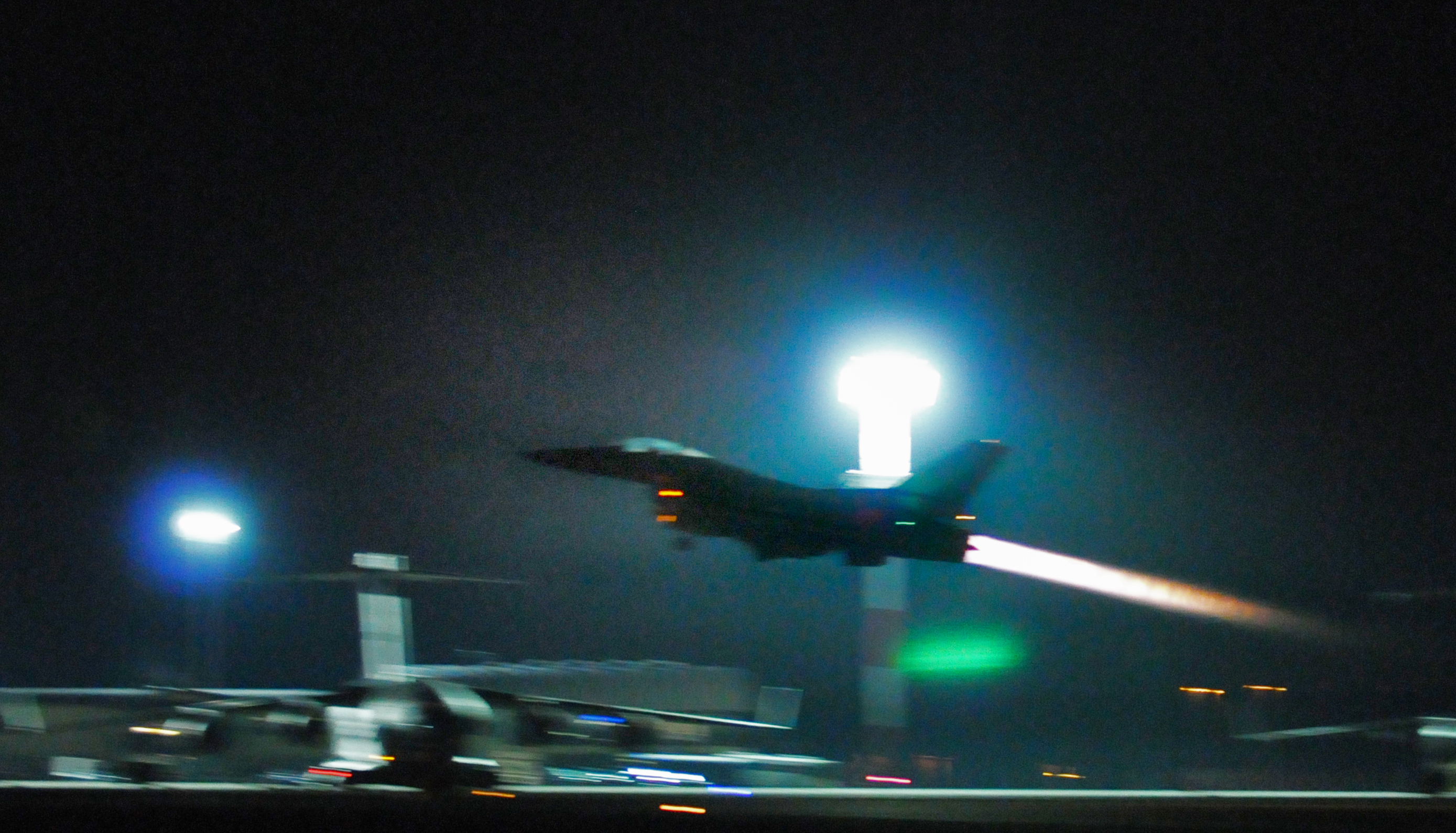
A U.S. Air Force F-16 from the 480th Fighter Squadron takes off from Spangdahlem Air Base in support of Operation Odyssey Dawn

The F-16 is used by the active duty USAF, Air Force Reserve, and Air National Guard units, the USAF aerial demonstration team, the U.S. Air Force Thunderbirds, and as an adversary-aggressor aircraft by the United States Navy at the Naval Strike and Air Warfare Center. Although initially designed to be a highly maneuverable fighter for air combat, the F-16 would primarily be flown by squadrons focused on ground attack that previously flew aircraft such as the F-105 Thunderchief or A-7 Corsair II.

The U.S. Air Force, including the Air Force Reserve and the Air National Guard, flew the F-16 in combat during Operation Desert Storm in 1991 and in the Balkans during the Yugoslav Wars later in the 1990s. During the NATO bombing of Yugoslavia, on 2 May 1999 an F-16 piloted by David L. Goldfein, later Chief of Staff of the United States Air Force, was shot down over western Serbia by the 250th Air Defence Missile Brigade. F-16s also patrolled the no-fly zones in Iraq during Operation Northern Watch and Operation Southern Watch and served during the War in Afghanistan and the War in Iraq from 2001 and 2003 respectively. In 2011, Air Force F-16s took part in the intervention in Libya.

On 11 September 2001, two unarmed F-16s were launched in an attempt to ram and down United Airlines Flight 93 before it reached Washington D.C. during the 11 September 2001 terrorist attacks, but Flight 93 was prematurely brought down by the hijackers after passengers attacked the cockpit, so the F-16s were retasked to patrol the local airspace and later escorted Air Force One back to Washington.

The F-16 had been scheduled to remain in service with the U.S. Air Force until 2025. Its replacement is planned to be the F-35A variant of the Lockheed Martin F-35 Lightning II, which is expected to gradually begin replacing several multirole aircraft among the program's member nations. However, owing to delays in the F-35 program, all USAF F-16s will receive service life extension upgrades. In 2022, it was announced the USAF would continue to operate the F-16 for another two decades.

=== Israel ===
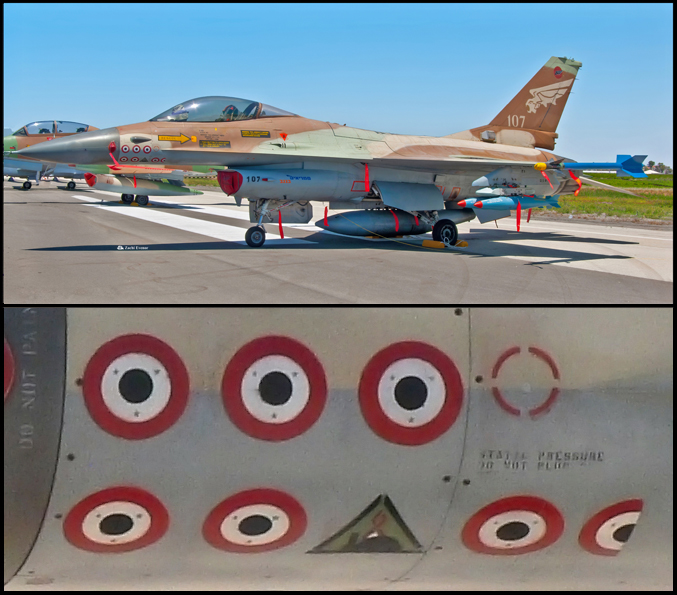
Israeli Air Force F-16A Netz 107 with 6.5 kill marks of other aircraft, a record for an F-16, as well as one kill mark of an Iraqi nuclear reactor.

The F-16's first air-to-air combat success was achieved by the Israeli Air Force (IAF) over the Bekaa Valley on 28 April 1981, against a Syrian Mi-8 helicopter, which was downed with cannon fire. On 7 June 1981, eight Israeli F-16s, escorted by six F-15s, executed Operation Opera, their first employment in a significant air-to-ground operation. This raid severely damaged Osirak, an Iraqi nuclear reactor under construction near Baghdad, to prevent the regime of Saddam Hussein from using the reactor for the creation of nuclear weapons.

The following year, during the 1982 Lebanon War Israeli F-16s engaged Syrian aircraft in one of the largest air battles involving jet aircraft, which began on 9 June and continued for two more days. Israeli Air Force F-16s were credited with 44 air-to-air kills during the conflict.

In January 2000, Israel completed a purchase of 102 new F-16I aircraft in a deal totaling $4.5 billion. F-16s were also used in their ground-attack role for strikes against targets in Lebanon. IAF F-16s participated in the 2006 Lebanon War and the 2008–09 Gaza War. During and after the 2006 Lebanon war, IAF F-16s shot down Iranian-made UAVs launched by Hezbollah, using Rafael Python 5 air-to-air missiles.

On 10 February 2018, an Israeli Air Force F-16I was shot down in northern Israel when it was hit by a relatively old model S-200 (NATO name SA-5 Gammon) surface-to-air missile of the Syrian Air Defense Force. The pilot and navigator ejected safely in Israeli territory. The F-16I was part of a bombing mission against Syrian and Iranian targets around Damascus after an Iranian drone entered Israeli airspace and was shot down. An Israel Air Force investigation determined on 27 February 2018 that the loss was due to pilot error since the IAF determined the air crew did not adequately defend themselves.

Following the aftermath of the October 7 attacks, F-16Is have played a major role in Israel's Operation Swords of Iron, executing numerous airstrikes against Hamas targets in Gaza. The IAF has also employed F-16s in operations against Hezbollah in Lebanon and in strikes on Iranian-linked assets in Syria and Iraq, demonstrating the aircraft's versatility and reach.

On 16 July 2024, the last single-seat F-16C Barak-1 ('Lightning' in Hebrew) were retired; the IAF continue to use the F-16D Brakeet and F-16I Sufa two-seat variants. In October 2024, during Operation Days of Repentance F-16Is took part in significant operations against Iranian military infrastructure as the Israeli forces launched coordinated strikes on Iranian air defense systems and missile production facilities, aiming to degrade Iran's military capabilities and deter further aggression.

Israeli F-16s have been instrumental in operations against Houthi targets in Yemen, taking advantage of the F-16's extended operational range and strategic reach, flying a distance of approximately 1,700 kilometers (about 1,056 miles). Notably, on 26 December 2024, as part of Operation Tzelilei HaKerem, the IAF conducted airstrikes targeting Sana'a International Airport and other strategic locations, responding to Houthi missile and drone attacks on Israeli territory.

In March 2026 during the Iran war the IRGC claims that it has shot down an Israeli F-16 however the IDF denies any damage to any of their aircraft.

=== Pakistan ===
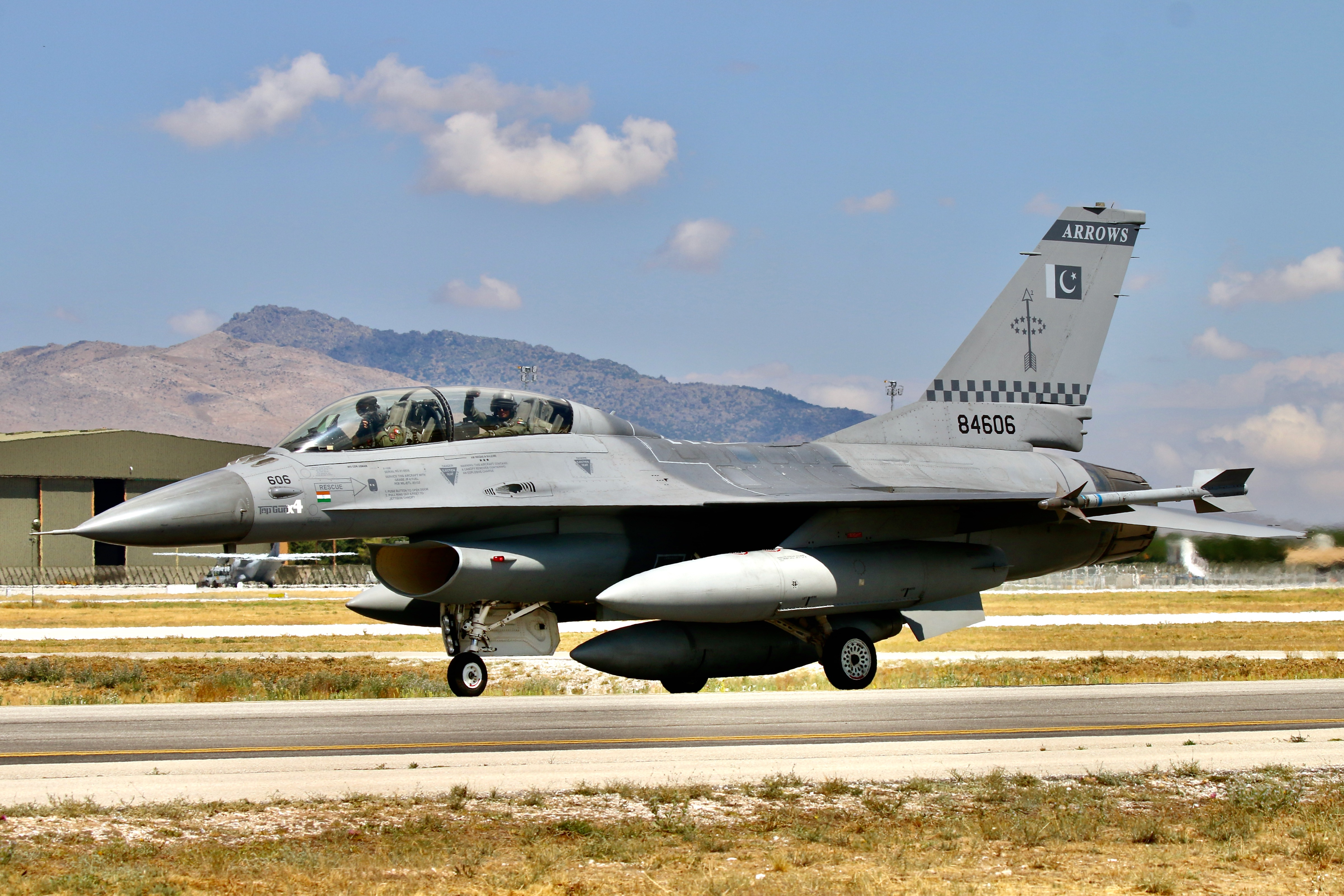
PAF F-16BM (S. No. 84-606), with the Indian MiG-21 kill mark visible on the nose.

During the Soviet–Afghan War, Pakistan Air Force (PAF) F-16As shot down between 20 and 30 Soviet and Afghan warplanes; the political situation however resulted in PAF officially recognizing only 9 kills which were made inside Pakistani airspace. From May 1986 to January 1989, PAF F-16s from the Tail Choppers and Griffin squadrons using mostly AIM-9 Sidewinder missiles, shot down four Afghan Su-22s, two MiG-23s, one Su-25, and one An-26. Most of these kills were by missiles, but at least one, a Su-22, was destroyed by cannon fire. One F-16 was lost in these battles. The downed F-16 was likely hit accidentally by the other F-16.

The Pakistan Air Force has used its F-16s in various foreign and internal military exercises, such as the "Indus Vipers" exercise in 2008 conducted jointly with Turkey.

Between May 2009 and November 2011, the PAF F-16 fleet flew more than 5,500 sorties in support of the Pakistan Army's operations against the Taliban insurgency in the FATA region of North-West Pakistan. More than 80% of the dropped munitions were laser-guided bombs.

On 27 February 2019, following six Pakistan Air Force airstrikes in Jammu and Kashmir, India, Pakistani officials said that two of its fighter jets shot down one MiG-21 and one Su-30MKI belonging to the Indian Air Force. Indian officials only confirmed the loss of one MiG-21 but denied losing any Su-30MKI in the clash and claimed the Pakistani claims as dubious. Additionally Indian officials also claimed to have shot down one F-16 belonging to the Pakistan Air Force. This was denied by the Pakistani side, considered dubious by neutral sources, and later backed by a report by Foreign Policy magazine, reporting that the US had completed a physical count of Pakistan's F-16s and found none missing. A report by The Washington Post noted that the Pentagon and State Department refused public comment on the matter but did not deny the earlier report.

In October 2025, Indian Air Force Chief of the Air Staff Amar Preet Singh claimed that five "high tech fighters" between F-16 and JF-17 class were downed by Indian air defense systems. Though refraining to provide the evidences, he also reiterated his claim of August 2025 that 4-5 F-16s in the hangars at PAF Base Shahbaz were hit in Indian strikes during the 2025 India–Pakistan conflict. However, the U.S. defense officials had earlier refuted the Indian claims by having told the Reuters that they were not aware of any F-16 being hit inside Pakistan.

Following the 2026 Iran war ceasefire in April 2026, Indian media sources reported that the Pakistan Air Force had mobilised its JF-17 and F-16 fighters, as well as IL-78 tankers and C-130 cargo planes. The fighters are expected to fly an escort mission for the Iranian representatives and the PAF set up a protective shield over Iran and the Persian Gulf for the Iranian delegation to travel to Islamabad for further negotiations with the United States. five PAF F-16s also escorted the US Vice President JD Vance's C-32 to Nur Khan base in Islamabad for negotiations.

=== Turkey ===
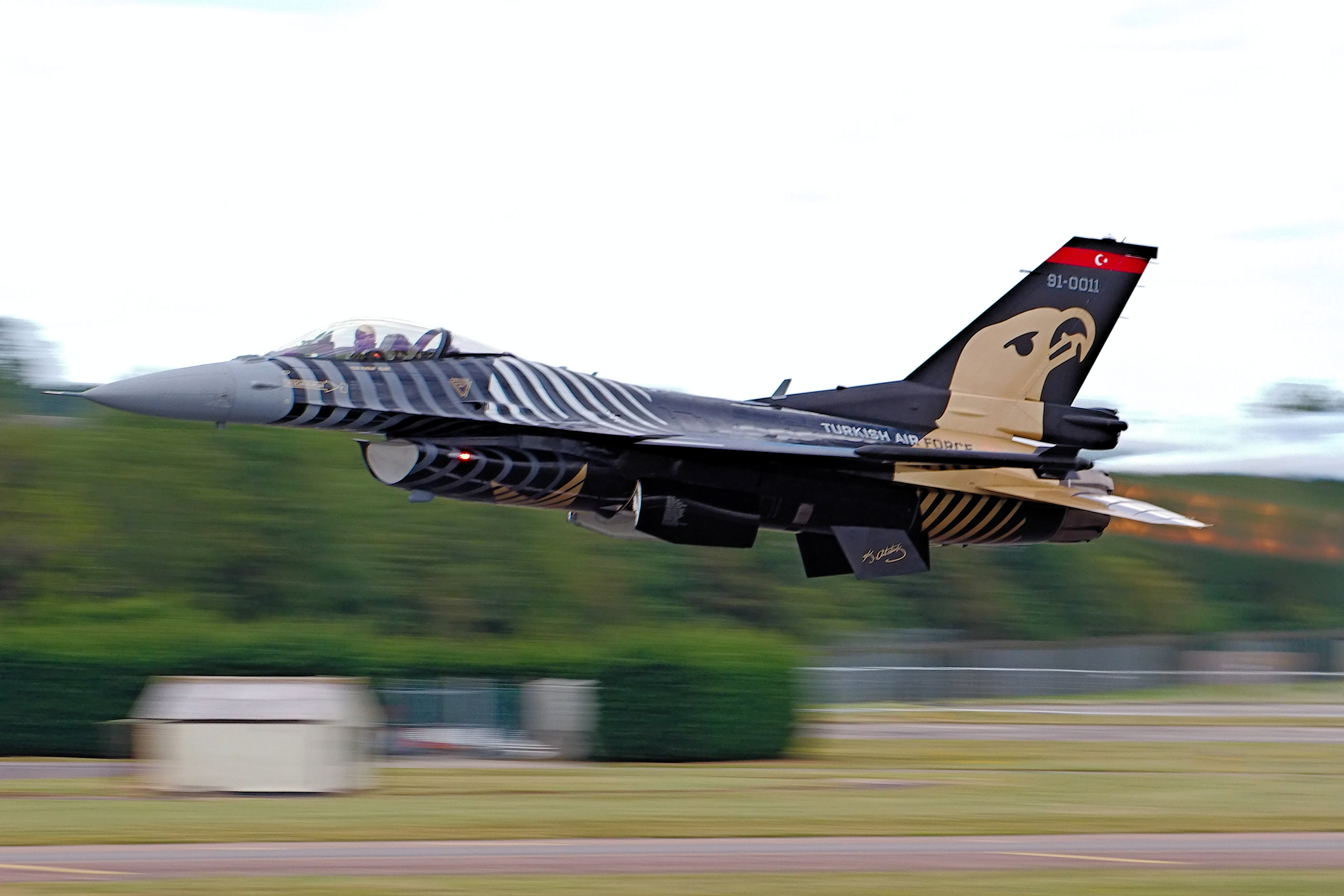
F-16 SoloTürk aerial aerobatic aircraft

The Turkish Air Force acquired its first F-16s in 1987. F-16s were later produced in Turkey under four phases of Peace Onyx programs. In 2015, they were upgraded to Block 50/52+ with CCIP by Turkish Aerospace Industries. Turkish F-16s are being fitted with indigenous AESA radars and EW suite called SPEWS-II.

On 18 June 1992, a Greek Mirage F1 crashed during a dogfight with a Turkish F-16. On 8 February 1995, a Turkish F-16 crashed into the Aegean Sea after being intercepted by Greek Mirage F1 fighters.

Turkish F-16s have participated in Bosnia-Herzegovina and Kosovo since 1993 in support of United Nations resolutions.

On 8 October 1996, seven months after the escalation a Greek Mirage 2000 reportedly fired an R.550 Magic II missile and shot down a Turkish F-16D over the Aegean Sea. The Turkish pilot died, while the co-pilot ejected and was rescued by Greek forces. In August 2012, after the downing of an RF-4E on the Syrian coast, Turkish Defence Minister İsmet Yılmaz confirmed that the Turkish F-16D was shot down by a Greek Mirage 2000 with an R.550 Magic II in 1996 near Chios island. Greece denies that the F-16 was shot down. Both Mirage 2000 pilots reported that the F-16 caught fire and they saw one parachute.

On 23 May 2006, two Greek F-16s intercepted a Turkish RF-4 reconnaissance aircraft and two F-16 escorts off the coast of the Greek island of Karpathos, within the Athens FIR. A mock dogfight ensued between the two sides, resulting in a midair collision between a Turkish F-16 and a Greek F-16. The Turkish pilot ejected safely, but the Greek pilot died owing to damage caused by the collision.

Turkey used its F-16s extensively in its conflict with Kurdish insurgents in southeastern parts of Turkey and Iraq. Turkey launched its first cross-border raid on 16 December 2007, a prelude to the 2008 Turkish incursion into northern Iraq, involving 50 fighters before Operation Sun. This was the first time Turkey had mounted a night-bombing operation on a massive scale, and also the largest operation conducted by the Turkish Air Force.

During the Syrian Civil War, Turkish F-16s were tasked with airspace protection on the Syrian border. After the RF-4 downing in June 2012 Turkey changed its rules of engagement against Syrian aircraft, resulting in scrambles and downings of Syrian combat aircraft. On 16 September 2013, a Turkish Air Force F-16 shot down a Syrian Arab Air Force Mil Mi-17 helicopter near the Turkish border. On 23 March 2014, a Turkish Air Force F-16 shot down a Syrian Arab Air Force MiG-23 when it allegedly entered Turkish air space during a ground attack mission against Al Qaeda-linked insurgents. On 16 May 2015, two Turkish Air Force F-16s shot down a Syrian Mohajer 4 UAV firing two AIM-9 missiles after it trespassed into Turkish airspace for 5 minutes. A Turkish Air Force F-16 shot down a Russian Air Force Sukhoi Su-24 on the Turkey-Syria border on 24 November 2015.

On 1 March 2020, two Syrian Sukhoi Su-24s were shot down by Turkish Air Force F-16s using air-to-air missiles over Syria's Idlib Governorate. All four pilots safely ejected. On 3 March 2020, a Syrian Arab Army Air Force L-39 combat trainer was shot down by a Turkish F-16 over Syria's Idlib province. The pilot died.

As a part of Turkish F-16 modernization program new air-to-air missiles are being developed and tested for the aircraft. GÖKTUĞ program led by TUBITAK SAGE has presented two types of air-to-air missiles named as Bozdogan (Merlin) and Gokdogan (Peregrine). While Bozdogan has been categorized as a Within Visual Range Air-to-Air Missile (WVRAAM), Gokdogan is a Beyond Visual Range Air-to-Air Missile (BVRAAM). On 14 April 2021, first live test exercise of Bozdogan have successfully completed and the first batch of missiles are expected to be delivered throughout the same year to the Turkish Air Force.

In January 2024, the United States approved the sale of 40 new F-16 Block 70/72 "Viper" aircraft. As of 1 June 2026, the U.S. Department of War had not publicly announced a firm production contract with Lockheed Martin for Turkey's procurement of 40 F-16 Block 70/72 fighters, although Turkish officials stated that the Letter of Offer and Acceptance (LOA) had entered into force following an initial payment.

Turkey has also initiated the indigenous Özgür modernization program for its F-16 fleet, led by Turkish Aerospace Industries and ASELSAN. The program replaces foreign mission computers and avionics with domestically developed systems. The initial Özgür-I phase focused primarily on Block 30 aircraft and introduced a national mission computer, indigenous operational flight software, new cockpit displays, IFF systems, and integration of Turkish-made weapons such as the Bozdoğan and Gökdoğan air-to-air missiles.

The expanded Özgür-II configuration is intended for Block 40 and Block 50 aircraft and includes more comprehensive upgrades such as AESA radar integration, advanced electronic warfare systems, improved communication suites, and compatibility with additional indigenous precision-guided munitions.

=== Egypt ===
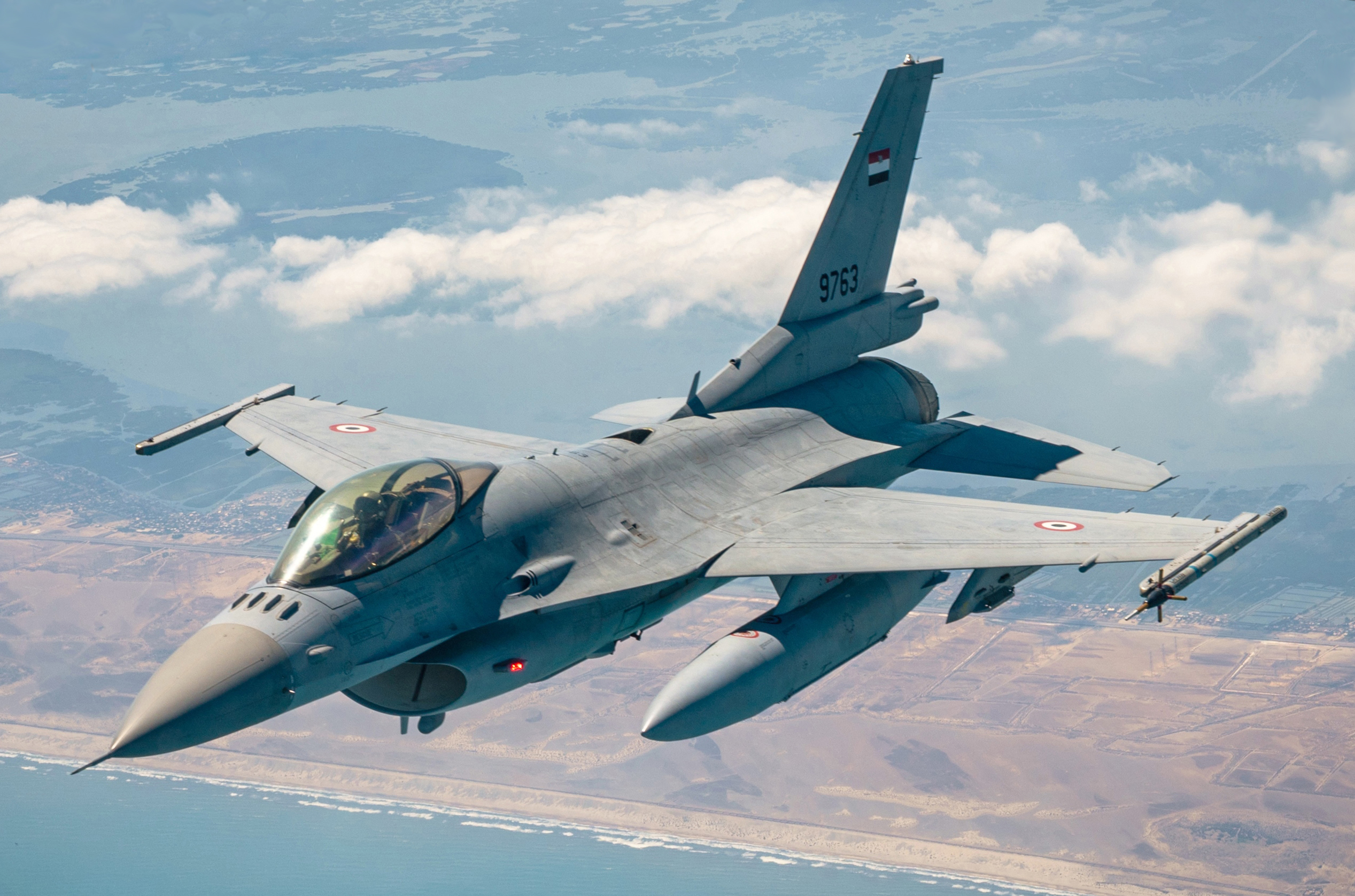
An F-16C of the Egyptian Air Force in 2022

On 16 February 2015, Egyptian F-16s struck weapons caches and training camps of the Islamic State (ISIS) in Libya in retaliation for the murder of 21 Egyptian Coptic Christian construction workers by masked militants affiliated with ISIS. The airstrikes killed 64 ISIS fighters, including three leaders in Derna and Sirte on the coast.

=== Europe ===
F-16s contribute to the NATO Dual Capable Aircraft program for delivery of US nuclear weapons stored in Europe. F-16 wings for this mission are operated by the Belgian Air Component at Kleine Brogel, the Royal Netherlands Air and Space Force at Volkel, by the USAF at Aviano in Italy, as well as potentially the Turkish Air Force at Incirlik in an emergency scenario. F-16s deployed in Europe have had a nuclear mission since 1982. They are intended to be replaced in this capacity by the Lockheed Martin F-35A Lightning II.

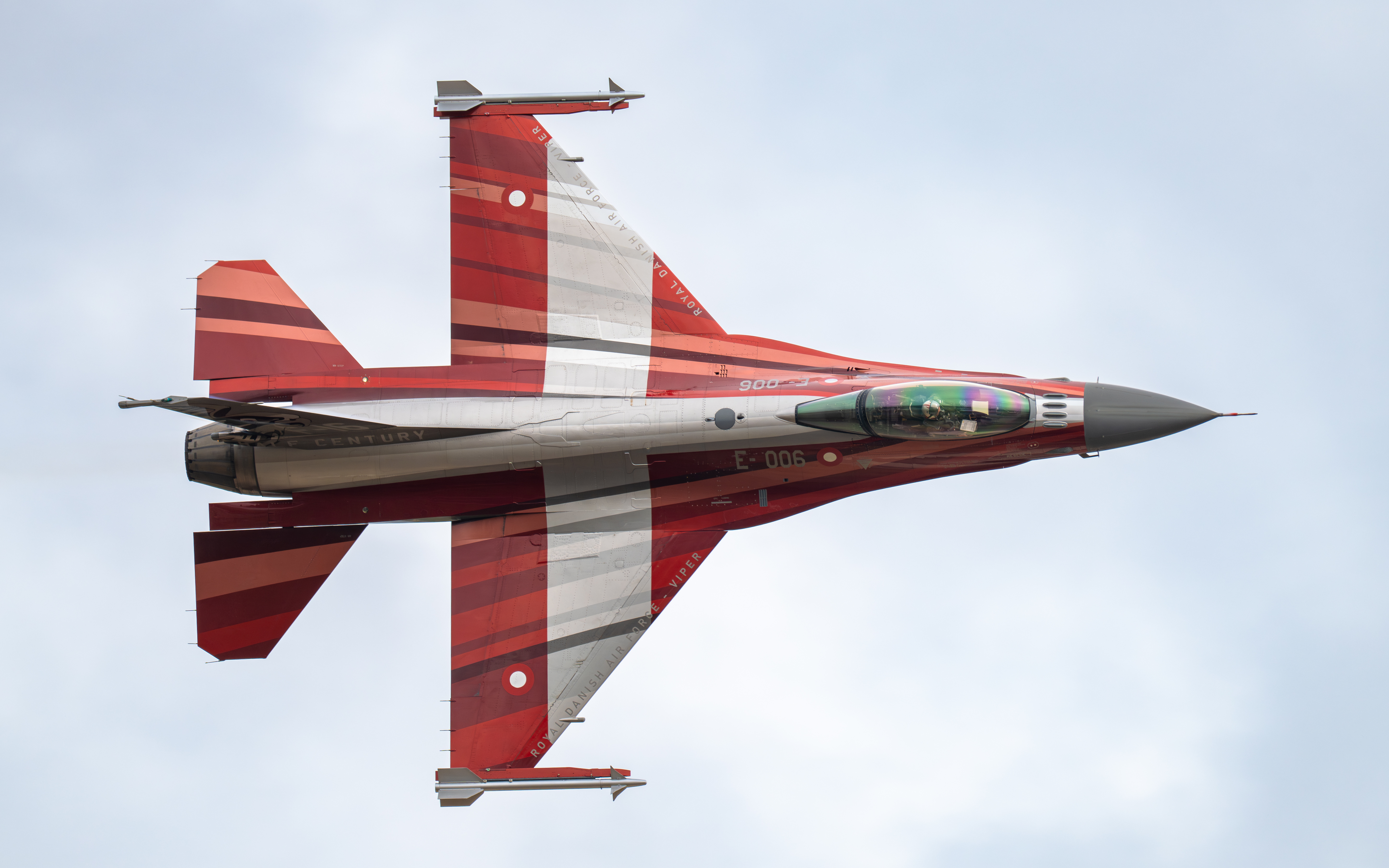
F-16AM in the type's last year of service for the Royal Danish Air Force in 2025.

The Royal Netherlands Air Force, Royal Danish Air Force, and Royal Norwegian Air Force all flew the F-16. All F-16s in most European air forces are equipped with drag chutes specifically to allow them to operate from automobile highways. The Belgian Air Component, and the Portuguese Air Force continue to operate early variants of the F-16, while the Hellenic Air Force fly a mix of Block 30, and upgraded Block 50 & 50+ variants.

A Yugoslavian MiG-29 was shot down by a Dutch F-16AM during the Kosovo War in 1999. Belgian and Danish F-16s also participated in joint operations over Kosovo during the war. Dutch, Belgian, Danish, and Norwegian F-16s were deployed during the 2011 intervention in Libya and in Afghanistan. In Libya, Norwegian F-16s dropped almost 550 bombs and flew 596 missions, some 17% of the total strike missions including the bombing of Muammar Gaddafi's headquarters.

In late March 2018, Croatia announced its intention to purchase 12 used Israeli F-16C/D "Barak"/"Brakeet" jets, pending U.S. approval. Acquiring these F-16s would allow Croatia to retire its aging MiG-21s. In January 2019, the deal was canceled because U.S. would only allow the resale if Israel stripped the planes of all the modernized electronics, while Croatia insisted on the original deal with all the upgrades installed. At the end of November 2021, Croatia signed with France instead, for 12 Rafales.

On 19 May 2026, an F-16 Fighting Falcon of the Romanian Air Force, operating under NATO's Baltic Air Policing mission, shot down a Ukrainian unmanned aircraft jammed by Russian electronic warfare over Estonian territory.

On 24 July 2026, an F-16 Fighting Falcon of the Romanian Air Force shot down an unmanned aircraft. The UAV was a Shahed-type (Geran-2) one-way attack drone used by Russian forces in the war against Ukraine. On 25 July 2026, another drone was shot down by the same pilot. On 26 July 2026, a Romanian F-16 shot down a third UAV over Romania's territorial waters in another airspace violation incident. A Romanian F-16 further destroyed a Russian unmanned surface vehicle close to the Neptun Deep offshore platform with its 20 mm cannon on 20 August, marking the first time a Romanian F-16 destroyed a maritime drone. On 17 October, two Romanian F-16s destroyed two Russian Geran-4 jet-powered drones, marking the first incident when Romanian aircraft shot down Russian jet drones.

=== Ukraine ===
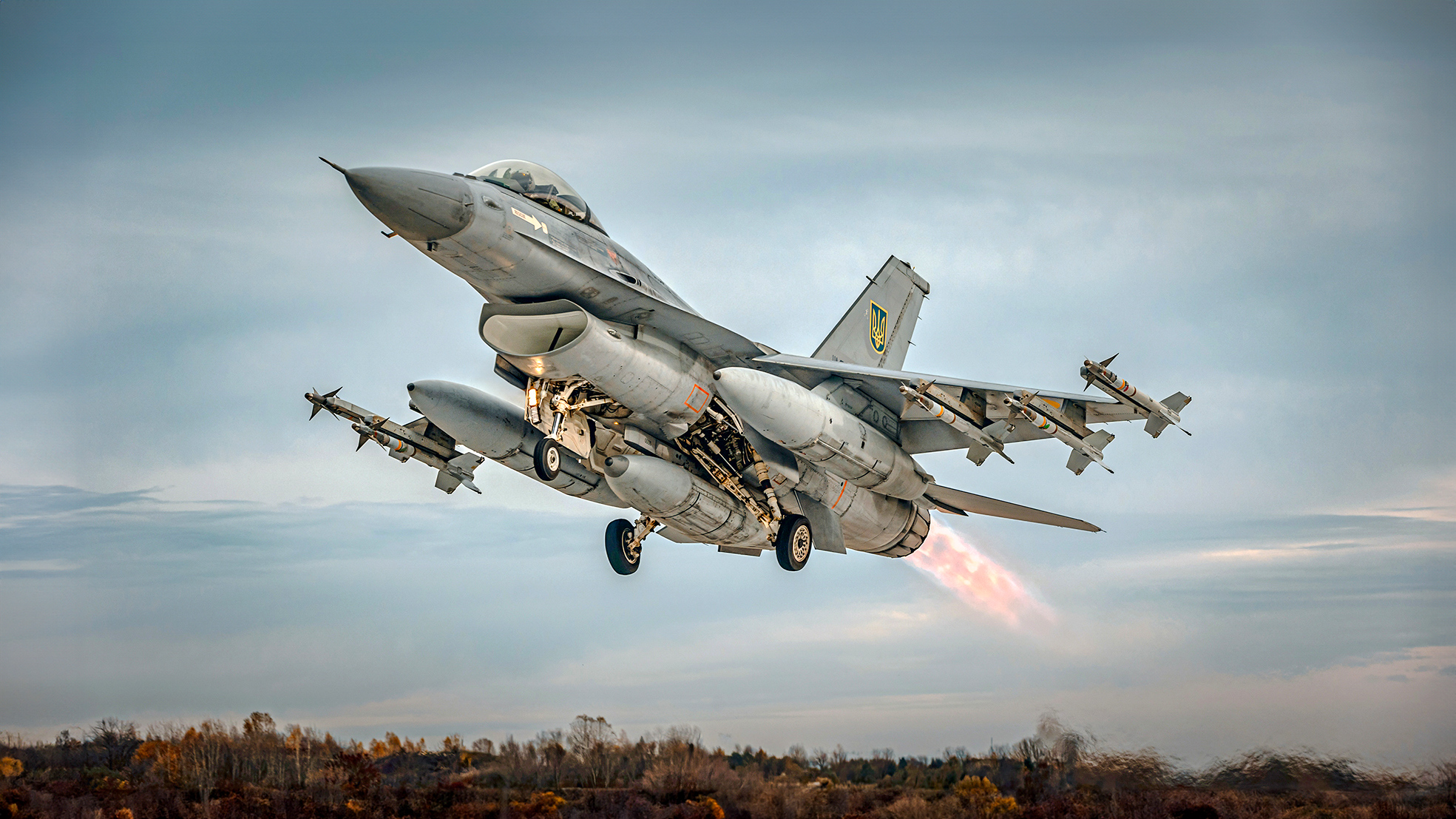
A Ukrainian Air Force F-16

In May 2023, an international coalition consisting of the United Kingdom, the Netherlands, Belgium and Denmark announced their intention to train Ukrainian Air Force pilots on the F-16 ahead of possible future deliveries to increase the Ukrainian Air Force capabilities in the current Russo-Ukrainian War. The U.S. confirmed that it would approve the re-export from these countries to Ukraine. Denmark has agreed to help train Ukrainians on their usage of the fighter. Denmark's acting Defence Minister Troels Lund Poulsen said that Denmark "will now be able to move forward for a collective contribution to train Ukrainian pilots to fly F-16s". On 6 July 2023, Romania announced that it will host the future training center after the meeting of the Supreme Council of National Defense. During the 2023 Vilnius summit, a coalition was formed consisting of Denmark, the Netherlands, Belgium, Canada, Luxembourg, Norway, Poland, Portugal, Romania, Sweden, the United Kingdom, and Ukraine. A number of Ukrainian pilots began training in Denmark and the U.S. The European F-16 Training Center, organized by Romania, the Netherlands, and Lockheed Martin through several subcontractors, officially opened on 13 November 2023. It is located at the Romanian Air Force's 86th Air Base, and Ukrainian pilots began training there in September 2024. On 17 August 2023, the U.S. approved the transfer of F-16s from the Netherlands and Denmark to Ukraine after the Ukrainian pilots have completed their training. The Netherlands and Denmark have announced that together they will donate up to 61 F-16AM/BM Block 15 MLU fighters to Ukraine once pilot training has been completed.

On 13 May 2024, Danish Prime Minister Mette Frederiksen said that "F-16 from Denmark will be in the air over Ukraine within months." Denmark is sending 19 F-16s in total. By the end of July 2024, the first F-16s were delivered to Ukraine.

On 4 August 2024, President Zelenskyy announced to the public that the F-16 was now in operational service with Ukraine. Zelenskyy stated at an opening ceremony that: "F-16s are in Ukraine. We did it. I am proud of our guys who are mastering these jets and have already started using them for our country".

On 26 August 2024, F-16s were reportedly used to intercept Russian cruise missiles for the first time. Also on 26 August, a Ukrainian F-16 crashed and the pilot, Oleksii Mes, was killed while intercepting Russian aerial targets during the cruise missile strikes. The cause is under investigation.

On 13 December 2024, the Ukrainian Air Force stated that an F-16 shot down six Russian cruise missiles. Two were downed with "medium-range missiles", another two with "short-range missiles", and two were claimed to be downed by 20 mm cannon.

On 12 April 2025, a Ukrainian Air Force F-16AM Block 20 was shot down in Sumy oblast, most likely by the S-400 missile system. The crew of the S-400 system received a reward of 15 million roubles from a Russian private oil extraction company.

By October 2025, four F-16 fighters had been lost by Ukrainian Air Force, with three pilots killed.

In April 2026, reports emerged that Ukrainian F-16 pilots undergoing training with the RAF were being trained to operate in GPS-denied environments due to extensive Russian electronic warfare and signal jamming encountered during the Russo-Ukrainian War. According to Royal Air Force instructors involved in the program, pilots were trained in low-altitude visual navigation and terrain-based orientation methods intended to compensate for degraded satellite navigation systems.

In July 2026, according to US general Dan Caine, a Ukrainian F-16 shot down a Russian Su-35. If confirmed, it would mark the first air-to-air victory for Ukrainian F-16 against Russian fighter aircraft.

At the International Fighter Conference in Munich on 5 November 2026, Ukraine's F-16 unit commander revealed that the country's F-16 fleet had shot down 4,700 Russian drones and cruise missiles since the aircraft entered service, with the fighter being responsible for 85% of all successful drone interceptions. The commander added that the F-16s shot down most targets with the onboard cannon, while APKWS rockets were used when available, and air-to-air missiles like the AIM-9 or AIM-120 were reserved as a last resort. Additionally, Ukraine's F-16s have also been used in airstrikes alongside older jets, utilizing precision-guided munitions.

At the same conference, the commander further revealed that a Ukrainian F-16 pilot, who is with the 107th Separate Aviation Wing, shot down 8 Russian drones in a single sortie using his fighter's cannon, returning to base with 100 rounds out of his original 500 rounds, and was made Hero of Ukraine after the mission. The same pilot broke the record a few days later when he shot down nine drones and returned with some 80 rounds remaining.

==== Combat losses ====
Ukraine has confirmed the loss of five F-16 fighters and three pilots as of July 2026.

The first crash occurred on 26 August 2024. An F-16 of the Ukrainian Air Force crashed in an undisclosed location in Ukraine during a Russian missile and drone attack. The pilot of the aircraft, Oleksii Mes, died in the crash. On 30 August 2024, the Commander of the Ukrainian Air Force, Mykola Oleshchuk, was dismissed by President Zelenskyy and replaced by Lieutenant General Anatolii Kryvonozhko, which was partially attributed to "indications" that the F-16 that crashed on 26 August was shot down in "a friendly fire incident". Ukrainian parliamentarian Maryana Bezuhla and Oleshchuk had previously argued over the cause of the F-16 loss.

The second crash occurred on 12 April 2025. Ukraine stated that pilot Pavlo Ivanov was killed in action flying an F-16. BBC Ukraine reported that Russian Armed Forces fired three missiles at the F-16, which was probably flying over the Sumy region, either from an S-400 surface-to-air system or R-37 air-to-air missiles.

The third crash occurred on 16 May 2025. The Ukrainian Air Force Command stated that a third F-16 was lost due to an unspecified onboard emergency while carrying out a mission to repel a Russian aerial attack. The pilot was stated to have steered the aircraft from populated areas before ejecting and was rescued in a stable condition.

The fourth crash occurred on 29 June 2025. A Ukrainian F-16 was lost and the pilot died while repelling a Russian missile and drone attack, the third F-16 Ukraine has lost in such a way. The pilot, Lieutenant Colonel Maksym Ustymenko, "used all of his onboard weapons and shot down seven air targets". The seventh damaged his fighter and forced him to fly away from a residential area before crashing.

On 29 July 2026, a Ukrainian F-16 crashed while on a combat mission, forcing the pilot to eject to safety. The cause of crash was “an in-flight emergency”, which is being investigated.

=== Venezuela ===
The Venezuela Air Force was the first Latin American operator of the F-16 and have used them on combat missions. Venezuela was granted permission to acquire 24 F-16s in the early 1980s, ordering 24 A/B models built to the Block 15 standard though they had originally sought 72. The purchase was rationalized to the American Government as a defense against Communism, specifically Cuban MiG-23s and MiG-21s and were used to equip Escuadrón 161 "Caribes" and Escuadrón 162 "Gavilanes" of Grupo Aéreo de Caza No.16 "Dragones". During the November 1992 Venezuelan coup attempt, two F-16A belonging to the government loyalist managed to shoot down two OV-10 Bronco and an AT-27 Tucano flown by the rebels and establishing aerial superiority for the government forces.

Two armed F-16s of the Venezuelan Air Force flew over the U.S. Navy destroyer USS Jason Dunham while in international waters, in what the U.S. Department of Defense described as a "show of force" and "highly provocative move". The action happened amidst tension between the U.S. and Venezuela due to ongoing U.S. military campaign against certain Latin American drug cartels.

=== Others ===
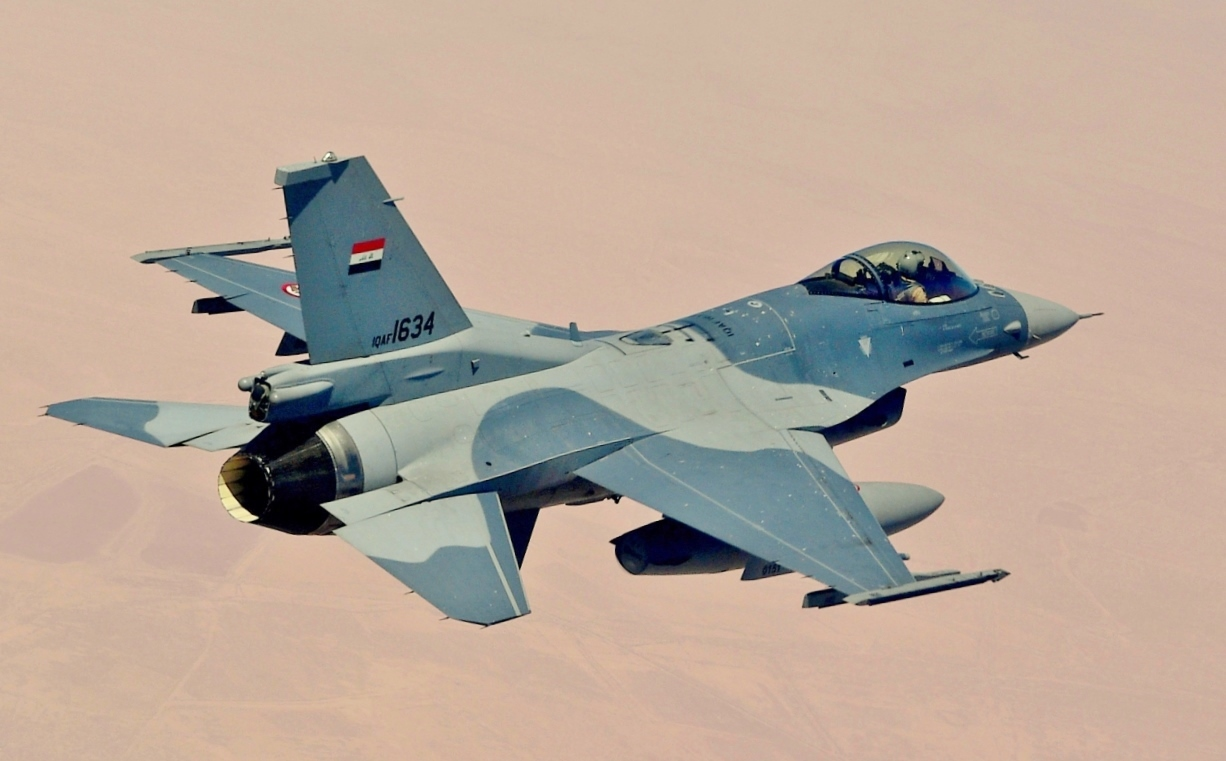
Iraqi Air Force F-16C

Two F-16B of the Indonesian Air Force intercepted and engaged several US Navy F/A-18 Hornets over the Java Sea in the 2003 Bawean incident.

The Royal Moroccan Air Force and the Royal Bahraini Air Force each lost a single F-16C, both shot down by Houthi anti-aircraft fire during the Saudi Arabian-led intervention in Yemen, respectively on 11 May 2015 and on 30 December 2015.

On 11 October 2023, Deputy Assistant Secretary for Regional Security Mira Resnick confirmed to Jorge Argüello, Argentinean ambassador to the US, that the State Department has approved the transfer of 38 F-16s from Denmark. On 16 April 2024, it was announced by defense minister Luis Petri that the country went through with the purchase of 24+1 Danish F-16s, that are to be brought up to date before they are sent to Argentina. The 25th plane, an F-16B MLU Block 10, meant for mechanics training, came disassembled in an Argentinian C-130 in late December 2024. The first aircraft, a F-16B, was unveiled in Buenos Aires on 24 February 2025.

F-16s of the Royal Thai Air Force were used to strike several Cambodian military targets during the 2025 Cambodia–Thailand conflict in July and December 2025.

=== Civilian operators ===
==== Top Aces ====
Top Aces F-16A Netz

In January 2021, Canadian defence contractor Top Aces announced that they had taken delivery of the first civilian owned F-16s to their US HQ in Mesa, Arizona. In an approval process that had taken years, they had purchased a batch of 29 F-16A/B Netz from the Israeli Air Force, including several that had taken part in Operation Opera. A year later, the first of these aircraft had finished the extensive AAMS mission system upgrades including AESA radar, HMCS, ECM, and Tactical Datalink. In late 2022 they began regular operations flying as contracted aggressors for USAF F-22 and F-35 squadrons in Luke AFB and Eglin AFB, as well as supporting exercises in other USAF and USMC bases.

== Variants ==
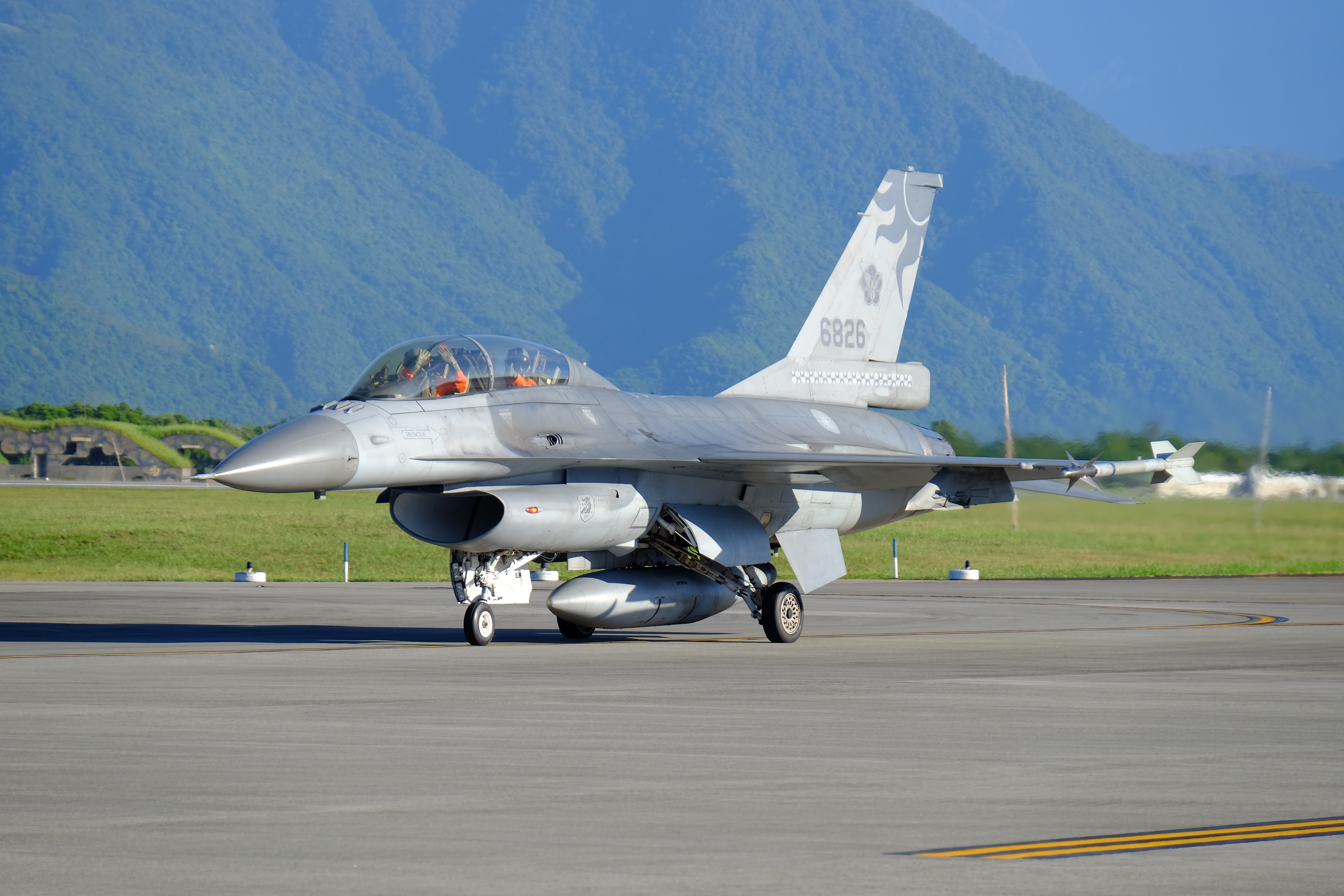
A Republic of China Air Force F-16B landing at Hualien Air Force Base

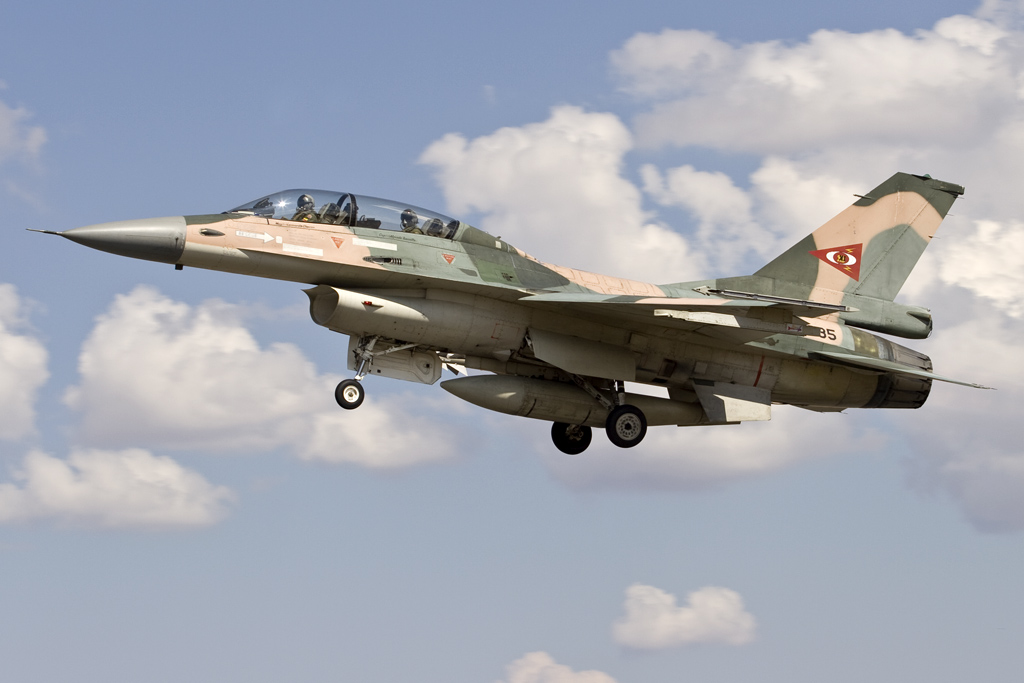
Venezuelan Air Force F-16B

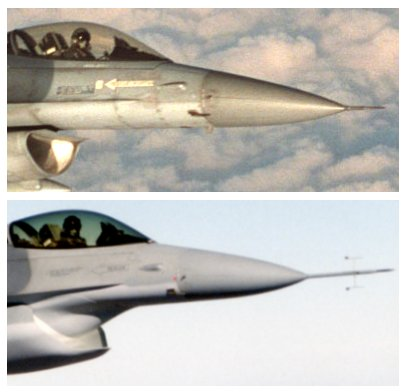
Testing of the F-35 diverterless supersonic inlet on an F-16 testbed. The original intake with splitter plate is shown in the top image.

F-16 models are denoted by increasing block numbers to denote upgrades. The blocks cover both single- and two-seat versions. A variety of software, hardware, systems, weapons compatibility, and structural enhancements have been instituted over the years to gradually upgrade production models and retrofit delivered aircraft.

While many F-16s were produced according to these block designs, there have been many other variants with significant changes, usually because of modification programs. Other changes have resulted in role-specialization, such as the close air support and reconnaissance variants. Several models were also developed to test new technology. The F-16 design also inspired the design of other aircraft, which are considered derivatives. Older F-16s are being converted into QF-16 drone targets.

F-16A/B
The F-16A (single seat) and F-16B (two seat) were initial production variants. These variants include the Block 1, 5, 10, 15, and 20 versions. Block 15 was the first major change to the F-16 with larger horizontal stabilizers. It is the most numerous of all F-16 variants with 983 produced. Around 300 earlier USAF F-16A and B aircraft were upgraded to the Block 15 Mid-Life Update (MLU) standard, getting analogous capability to F-16C/D Block 50/52 aircraft. From 1987 a total of 214 Block 15 aircraft were upgraded to OCU (Operational Capability Upgrade) standard, with engines, structural and electronic improvements, and from 1988 all Block 15 were directly built to OCU specifications. Between 1989 and 1992 a total of 271 Block 15OCU airframes (246 F-16A and 25 F-16B) were converted at the Ogden Air Logistic Center to the ADF (Air Defense Fighter) variant, with improved IFF system, radio and radar, the ability to carry advanced Beyond Visual Range missiles and the addition of a side-mounted 150,000 candlepower spotlight for visual night identification of intruders. Originally intended for Cold-War air defense of the continental U.S. airspace, with the fall of the Berlin Wall the ADF lost a clear mission, and most were mothballed starting from 1994. Some mothballed ADFs were later exported to Jordan (12 -A and 4 -B models) and Thailand (15 -A and 1 -B), while 30 -A and 4 -B models were leased to Italy from 2003 to 2012

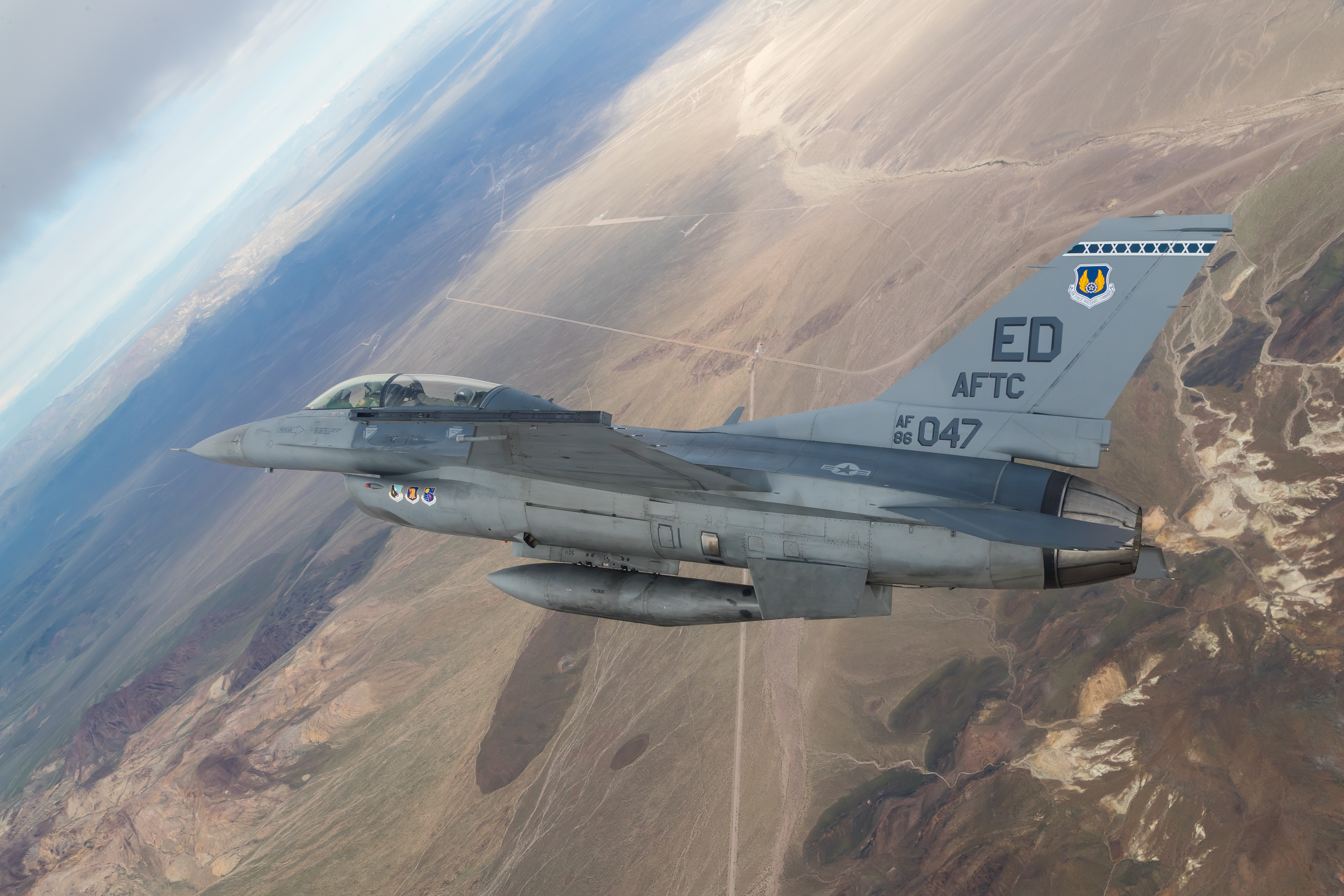
An F-16D assigned to the 416th Flight Test Squadron, 412th Test Wing, Air Force Test Center, flies over the Mojave Desert near Edwards AFB, California

F-16C/D

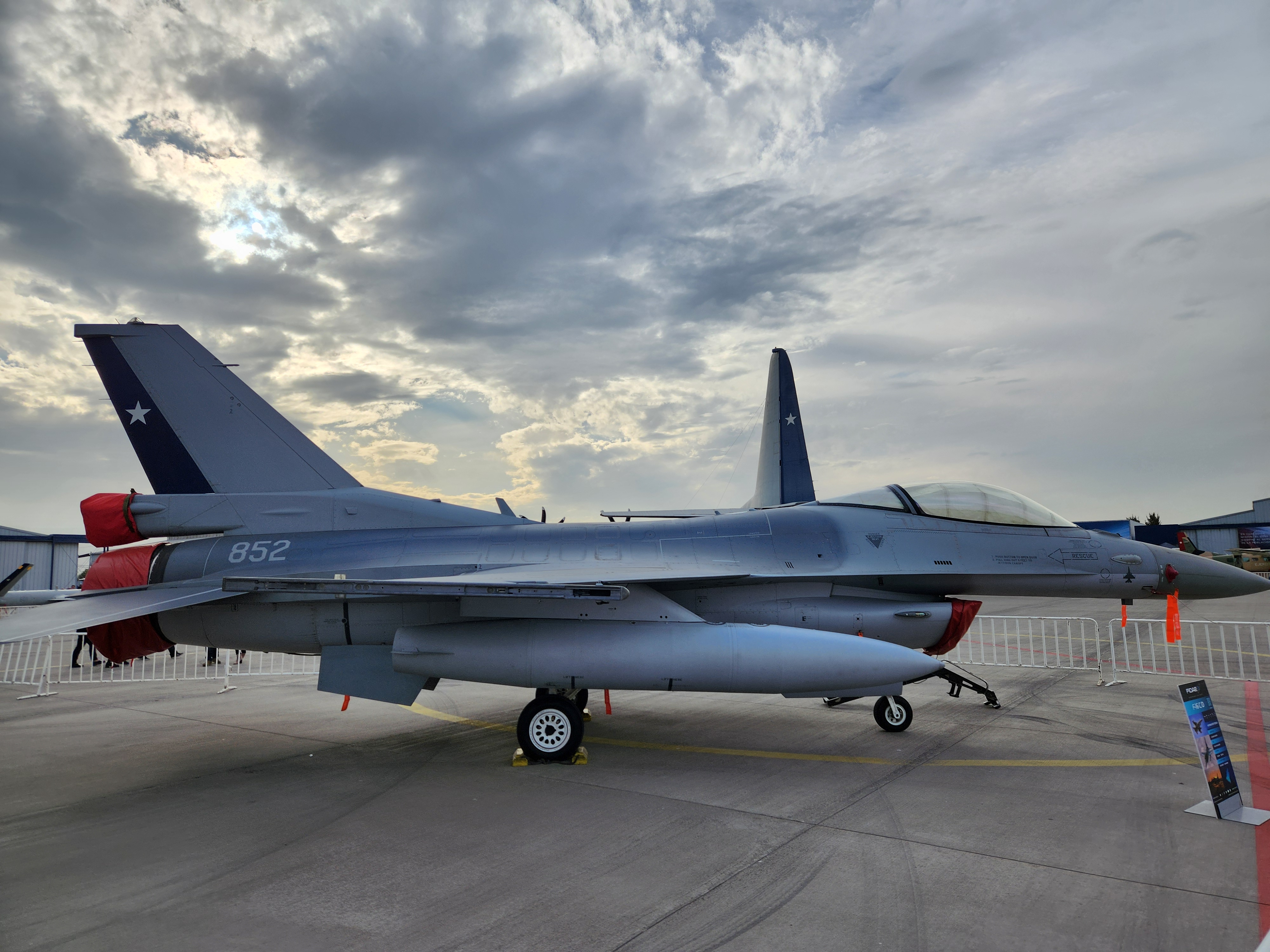
F-16C Block 50M of the Chilean Air Force

The F-16C (single seat) and F-16D (two seat) variants entered production in 1984. The first C/D version was the Block 25 with improved cockpit avionics and radar which added all-weather capability with beyond-visual-range (BVR) AIM-7 and AIM-120 air-air missiles. Block 30/32, 40/42, and 50/52 were later C/D versions. The F-16C/D had a unit cost of US$18.8 million (1998). Operational cost per flight hour has been estimated at $7,000 to $22,470 or $24,000, depending on the calculation method.

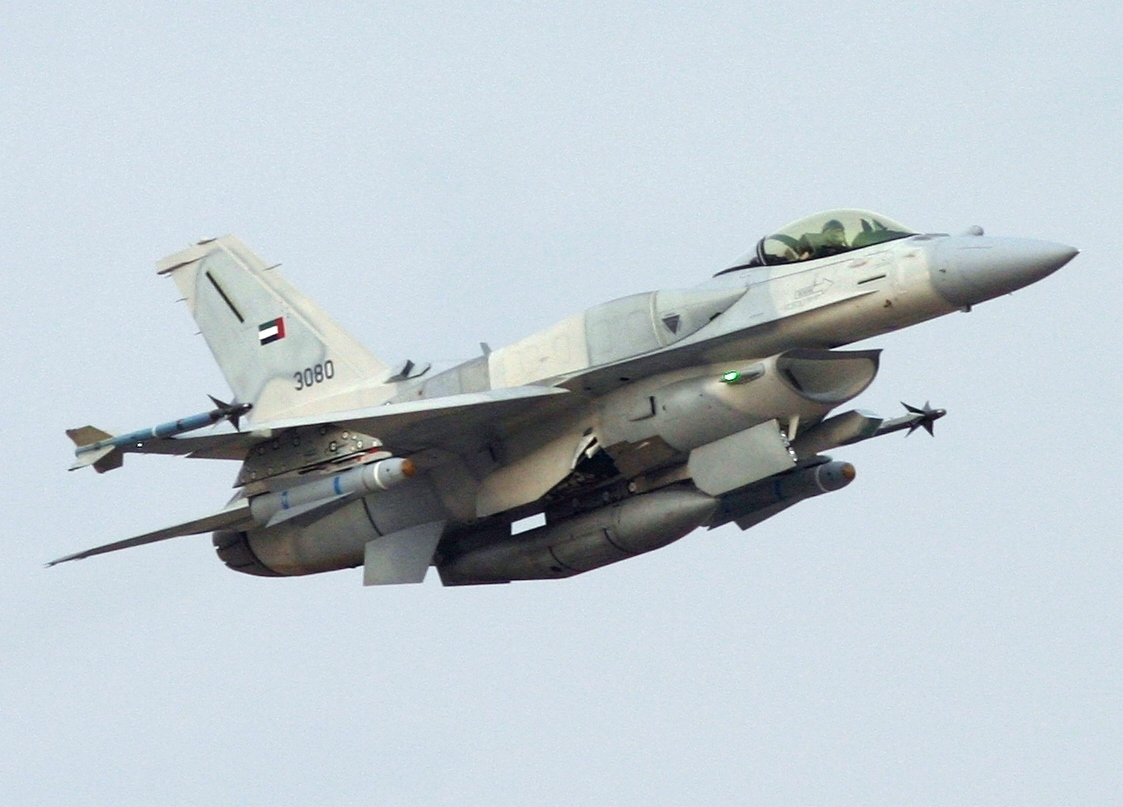
United Arab Emirates Air Force F-16E Block 60 with the IFTS pod, CFTs, and various external armament taking off

F-16E/F
The F-16E (single seat) and F-16F (two seat) are newer F-16 Block 60 variants based on the F-16C/D Block 50/52. The United Arab Emirates invested heavily in their development. They feature improved AN/APG-80 active electronically scanned array (AESA) radar, infrared search and track (IRST), avionics, conformal fuel tanks (CFTs), and the more powerful General Electric F110-GE-132 engine. (Note: The F-16XL was originally referred to as "F-16E", with "F-16F" reserved for a variant, however this was dropped after the decision was made to procure the F-15E Strike Eagle instead.)

F-16IN
For the Indian MRCA competition for the Indian Air Force, Lockheed Martin offered the F-16IN Super Viper. The F-16IN is based on the F-16E/F Block 60 and features conformal fuel tanks; AN/APG-80 AESA radar, General Electric F110-GE-132A engine with FADEC controls; electronic warfare suite and infrared search and track (IRST) unit; updated glass cockpit; and a helmet-mounted cueing system. As of 2011, the F-16IN is no longer in the competition. In 2016, Lockheed Martin offered the new F-16 Block 70/72 version to India under the Make in India program. In 2016, the Indian government offered to purchase 200 (potentially up to 300) fighters in a deal worth $13–15bn. As of 2017, Lockheed Martin has agreed to manufacture F-16 Block 70 fighters in India with the Indian defense firm Tata Advanced Systems Limited. The new production line could be used to build F-16s for India and for exports.

F-16IQ
In September 2010, the Defense Security Cooperation Agency informed the United States Congress of a possible Foreign Military Sale of 18 F-16IQ aircraft along with the associated equipment and services to the newly reformed Iraqi Air Force. The total value of sale was estimated at US$4.2 billion. The Iraqi Air Force purchased those 18 jets in the second half of 2011, then later exercised an option to purchase 18 more for a total of 36 F-16IQs. As of 2021, the Iraqi had lost two in accidents. By 2023, the US government reported that these jets were Iraq's most capable airborne platforms with a 66 percent mission-capable rate. Their maintenance was being supported by private contractors. At the same time, Iraq's Russian-made systems were suffering from sanctions imposed in the wake of Russia's invasion of Ukraine.

F-16N
The F-16N was an adversary aircraft operated by the United States Navy. It is based on the standard F-16C/D Block 30, is powered by the General Electric F110-GE-100 engine, and is capable of supercruise. The F-16N has a strengthened wing and is capable of carrying an Air Combat Maneuvering Instrumentation (ACMI) pod on the starboard wingtip. Although the single-seat F-16Ns and twin-seat (T)F-16Ns are based on the early-production small-inlet Block 30 F-16C/D airframe, they retain the APG-66 radar of the F-16A/B. In addition, the aircraft's 20 mm cannon has been removed, as has the airborne self-protection jammer (ASPJ), and they carry no missiles. Their EW fit consists of an ALR-69 radar warning receiver (RWR) and an ALE-40 chaff/flare dispenser. The F-16Ns and (T)F-16Ns have the standard Air Force tailhook and undercarriage and are not aircraft carrier–capable. Production totaled 26 airframes, of which 22 are single-seat F-16Ns and 4 are twin-seat TF-16Ns. The initial batch of aircraft was in service between 1988 and 1998. At that time, hairline cracks were discovered in several bulkheads, and the Navy did not have the resources to replace them, so the aircraft were eventually retired, with one aircraft sent to the collection of the National Naval Aviation Museum at NAS Pensacola, Florida, and the remainder placed in storage at Davis-Monthan AFB. These aircraft were later replaced by embargoed ex-Pakistani F-16s in 2003. The original inventory of F-16Ns was previously operated by adversary squadrons at NAS Oceana, Virginia; NAS Key West, Florida; and the former NAS Miramar, California. The current F-16A/B aircraft are operated by the Naval Strike and Air Warfare Center at NAS Fallon, Nevada.

Lockheed Martin F-16V Viper
At the 2012 Singapore Air Show, Lockheed Martin unveiled plans for the new F-16V variant with the V suffix for its Viper nickname. It features an AN/APG-83 active electronically scanned array (AESA) radar, a new mission computer and electronic warfare suite, an automated ground collision avoidance system, and various cockpit improvements; this package is an option on current production F-16s and can be retrofitted to most in service F-16s. First flight took place 21 October 2015. Taiwanese media reported that Taiwan and the U.S. both initially invested in the development of the F-16V. Upgrades to Taiwan's F-16 fleet began in January 2017. The first country to confirm the purchase of 16 new F-16 Block 70/72 was Bahrain. Greece announced the upgrade of 84 F-16C/D Block 52+ and Block 52+ Advanced (Block 52M) to the latest V (Block 70/72) variant in October 2017. Slovakia announced on 11 July 2018 that it intends to purchase 14 F-16 Block 70/72 aircraft. Lockheed Martin has redesignated the F-16V Block 70 as the "F-21" in its offering for India's fighter requirement. Taiwan's Republic of China Air Force announced on 19 March 2019 that it formally requested the purchase of an additional 66 F-16V fighters. The Trump administration approved the sale on 20 August 2019. On 14 August 2020, Lockheed Martin was awarded a US$62 billion contract by the US DoD that includes 66 new F-16s at US$8 billion (~$9.79 billion in 2025) for Taiwan.

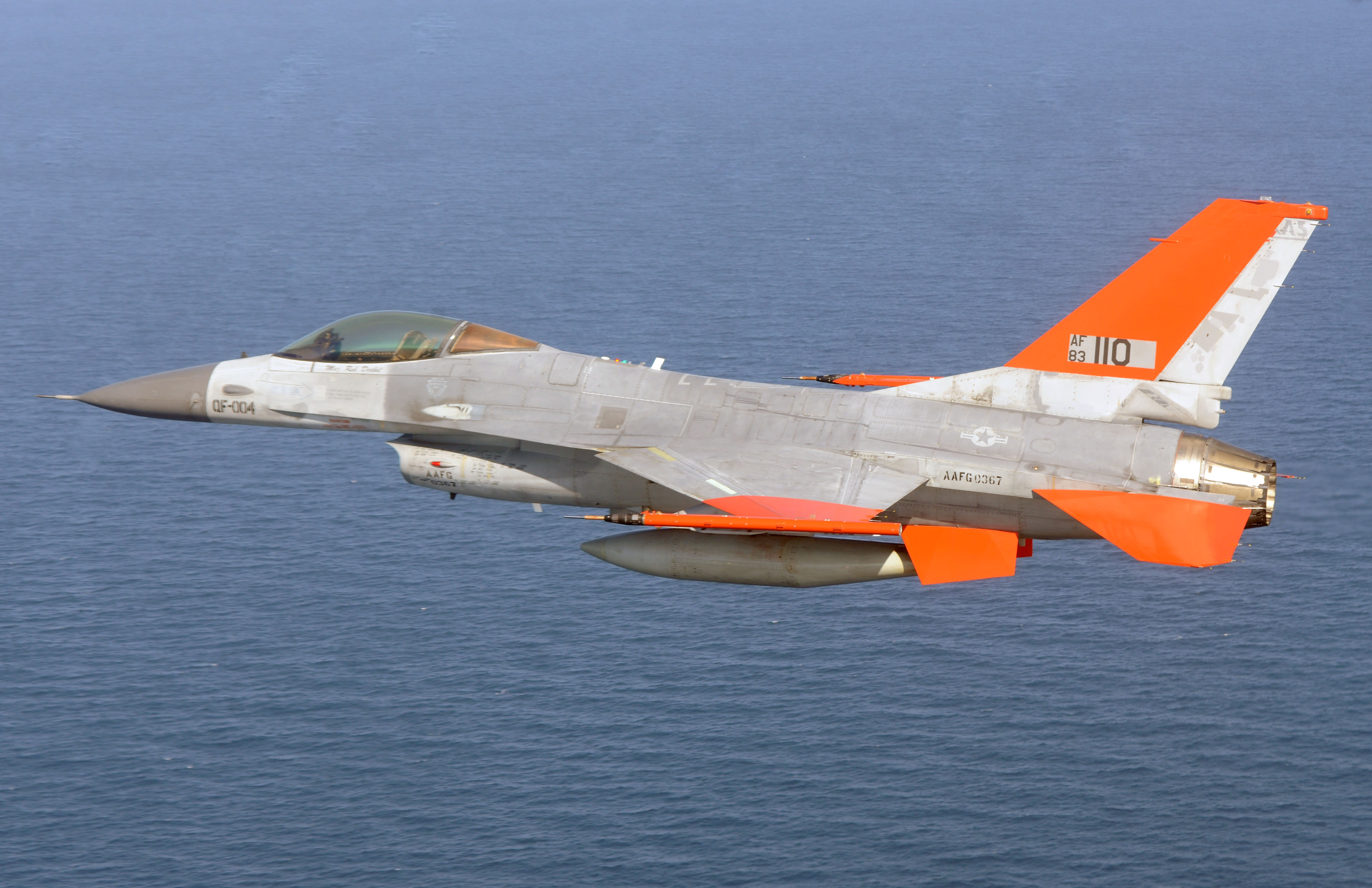
USAF QF-16A, on its first unmanned test flight, over the Gulf of Mexico

QF-16
In September 2013, Boeing and the U.S. Air Force tested an unmanned F-16, with two US Air Force pilots controlling the airplane from the ground as it flew from Tyndall AFB over the Gulf of Mexico.

F-16G
In September 2026, it was reported that the US plans to order F-16s after more than 20 years. This new variant is to be more advanced than the F-16V. It will have Northrop Grumman's Integrated Viper Electronic Warfare Suite (IVEWS) also known as AN/ALQ-257, and an upgraded targeting pod Litening LA. The new variant will also have conformal fuel tanks, 600 U.S. gallons (2,300 L) wing tanks, a drag chute, and IRST.

=== Related developments ===
Vought Model 1600
Proposed naval variant
General Dynamics F-16XL
1980s technology demonstrator
General Dynamics NF-16D VISTA
1990s experimental fighter
Mitsubishi F-2
1990s Japanese multirole fighter based on the F-16

== Operators ==
Operators: Current Former Future

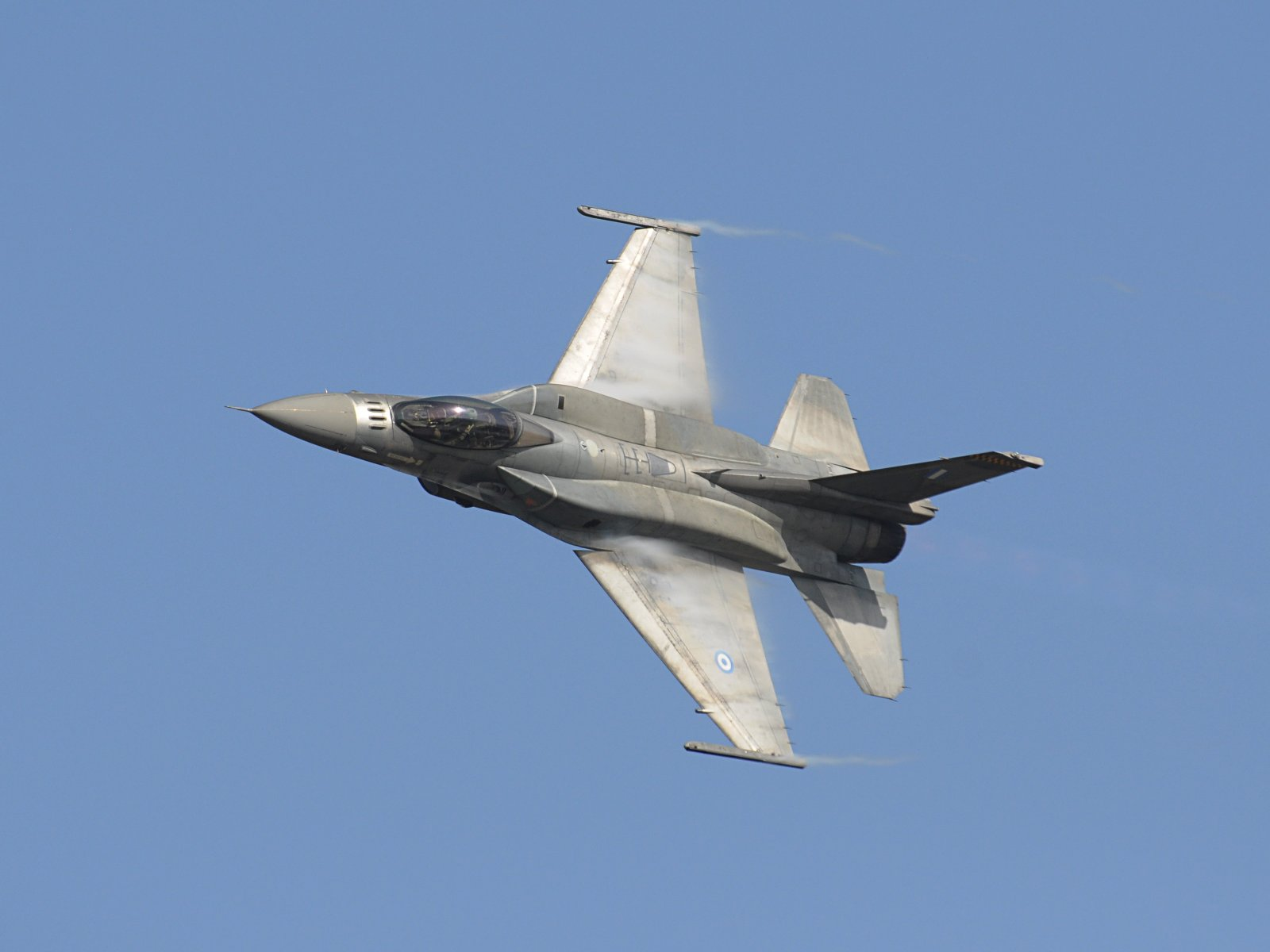
F-16C Block 52 of the Hellenic Air Force with conformal fuel tanks and Advanced IFF (AIFF)

As of 2026, there were 2,102 F-16s in active service around the world.

- Argentina
- Bahrain - Royal Bahraini Air Force operates 16 single-seat F-16C Block 40s and 4 dual-seat F-16D Block 40s.
- Belgium
- Bulgaria
- Chile
- Egypt
- Greece - 120 F-16s being upgraded to Viper F-16Vs.
- Indonesia
- Iraq
- Israel
- Jordan - Royal Jordanian Air Force operates 44 F-16AM Block 20 MLU and 15-18 F-16BM Block 20 MLU.
- Morocco - The Royal Moroccan Air Force is converting its 23 F-16C/D Block 52+ to F-16Vs.
- Oman
- Pakistan
- Peru
- Poland - The Polish Air Force is converting its 48 Block 52+ to F-16Vs.
- Portugal
- Republic of China - Republic of China Air Force operates 139 F-16V converted from its F-16 Block 20s. 66 F-16 Block 70s being delivered.
- Romania - operates 64 F-16 MLUs + 1 for ground training.
- Singapore
- Slovakia
- South Korea
- Thailand
- Turkey
- Ukraine
- United Arab Emirates
- United States
- Venezuela

=== Former operators ===
- Denmark – Royal Danish Air Force sold 24 F-16s to Argentine Air Force in 2024. 19 F-16s donated to Ukrainian Air Force.
- Italy – Italian Air Force used up to 30 F-16As and 4 F-16Bs of the Block 15 ADF variant, leased from the U.S. Air Force, from 2003 to 2012.
- Netherlands – Royal Netherlands Air and Space Force originally bought 213 aircraft. Later sold six F-16s to Royal Jordanian Air Force, and 36 F-16s to Chilean Air Force in 2005. It donated the remaining operational fleet of 24 aircraft to Ukraine as part of the F-16 training coalition in 2024-25.
- Norway – Royal Norwegian Air Force (RNoAF) on 6 January 2022, Norway announced that all F-16s had been retired and replaced with the F-35. The RNoAF sold 32 of their F-16s to Romanian Air Force, with the remaining operational aircraft being donated to Ukraine.

== Notable accidents and incidents ==
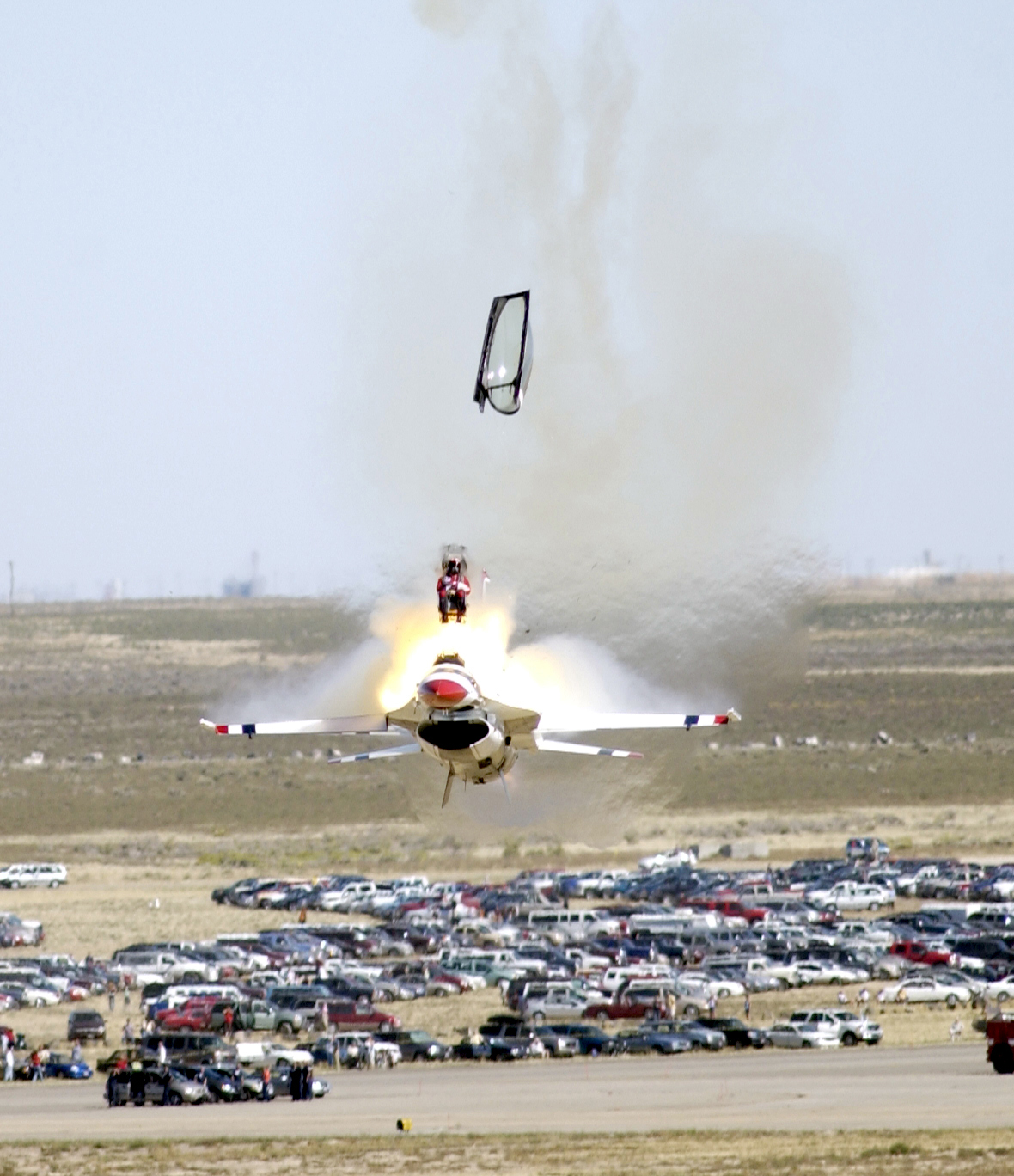
A U.S. Air Force Thunderbirds pilot ejects from the F-16 just before impact at an air show in September 2003 at Mountain Home Air Force Base

The F-16 has been involved in over 670 hull-loss accidents as of January 2025.

- On 8 May 1975, while practicing a 9-g aerial display maneuver with the second YF-16 (tail number 72-1568) at Fort Worth, Texas, prior to being sent to the Paris Air Show, one of the main landing gears jammed. The test pilot, Neil Anderson, had to perform an emergency gear-up landing and chose to do so in the grass, hoping to minimize damage and avoid injuring any observers. The aircraft was only slightly damaged, but because of the mishap, the first prototype was sent to the Paris Air Show in its place.
- On 15 November 1982, while on a training flight outside Kunsan Air Base in South Korea, USAF Captain Ted Harduvel died when he crashed inverted into a mountain ridge. In 1985, Harduvel's widow filed a lawsuit against General Dynamics claiming an electrical malfunction, not pilot error, as the cause; a jury awarded the plaintiff $3.4 million in damages. However, in 1989, the U.S. Court of Appeals ruled the contractor had immunity to lawsuits, overturning the previous judgment. The court remanded the case to the trial court "for entry of judgment in favor of General Dynamics". The accident and subsequent trial was the subject of the 1992 film Afterburn.
- On 23 March 1994, during a joint Army-Air Force exercise at Pope AFB, North Carolina, F-16D (AF Serial No. 88-0171) of the 23d Fighter Wing / 74th Fighter Squadron was simulating an engine-out approach when it collided with a USAF C-130E. Both F-16 crew members ejected, but their aircraft, on full afterburner, continued on an arc towards Green Ramp and struck a USAF C-141 that was being boarded by US Army paratroopers. This accident resulted in 24 fatalities and at least 100 others injured. It has since been known as the "Green Ramp disaster".
- On 15 September 2003, a United States Air Force Thunderbirds F-16C crashed during an air show at Mountain Home AFB, Idaho. Captain Christopher Stricklin attempted a "split S" maneuver based on an incorrect mean-sea-level altitude of the airfield. Climbing to only 1,670 ft (510 m) above ground level instead of 2,500 ft (760 m), Stricklin had insufficient altitude to complete the maneuver, but was able to guide the aircraft away from spectators and ejected less than one second before impact. Stricklin survived with only minor injuries; the aircraft was destroyed. USAF procedure for demonstration "Split-S" maneuvers was changed, requiring both pilots and controllers to use above-ground-level (AGL) altitudes.
- On 26 January 2015, a Greek F-16D crashed while performing a NATO training exercise in Albacete, Spain. Both crew members and nine French soldiers on the ground died when it crashed in the flight line, destroying or damaging two Italian AMXs, two French Alpha jets, and one French Mirage 2000. Investigations suggested that the accident was due to an erroneous rudder setting that was caused by loose papers in the cockpit.
- On 7 July 2015, an F-16CJ collided with a Cessna 150M over Moncks Corner, South Carolina, U.S. The pilot of the F-16 ejected safely, but both people in the Cessna were killed.
- On 11 October 2018, an F-16 MLU from the 2nd Tactical Wing of the Belgian Air Component, on the apron at Florennes Air Station, was hit by a gun burst from a nearby F-16, whose cannon was fired inadvertently during maintenance. The aircraft caught fire and burned to the ground, while two other F-16s were damaged and two maintenance personnel were treated for aural trauma.
- On 11 March 2020, a Pakistani F-16AM (Serial No. 92730) of the No. 9 Squadron (Pakistan Air Force) crashed in the Shakarparian area of Islamabad during rehearsals for the Pakistan Day Parade. The plane crashed when the F-16 was executing an aerobatic loop. As a result, the pilot of the F-16, Wing Commander Noman Akram, who was also the Commanding Officer of the No. 9 Squadron "Griffins", lost his life. A board of inquiry ordered by the Pakistan Air Force later revealed that the pilot had every chance to eject but opted not to and tried his best to save the aircraft and avoid civilian casualties on the ground. Videos taken by locals on the ground show his F-16AM crashing into some woods. He was hailed a hero by Pakistanis while also gaining some attention internationally.
- On 20 March 2024, an F-16 operated by the Hellenic Air Force crashed into the sea, close to the island of Psathoura in the northern Aegean Sea. The pilot ejected from the aircraft and was later rescued.
- On 30 April 2024, a U.S. Air Force F-16 crashed outside Holloman Air Force Base, located near Alamogordo in New Mexico. The pilot ejected safely before impact.
- On 8 May 2024, an F-16C of the Republic of Singapore Air Force crashed during takeoff within Tengah Air Base. The pilot successfully ejected from the aircraft without major injuries. The cause was later identified to be from the malfunction of two of the three primary pitch rate gyroscopes on the aircraft. This was noted to be a "rare occurrence" by Lockheed Martin due to the concurrent failure of the two independent pitch rate gyroscopes giving similar inputs which caused the digital flight control computer to reject inputs from the correctly functioning pitch rate gyroscope and the backup pitch rate gyroscope when it was activated by the rejection of a primary pitch rate gyroscope.
- On 28 August 2025, a Polish Air Force F-16C Block 52+, from the Tiger Demo Team, crashed in Poland, while practicing for the Radom Airshow. The pilot did not survive the accident and the airshow was cancelled.
- On 9 July 2026, a Hellenic Air Force F-16C Block 52+ ADV was extensively damaged when it made a gear-up landing at Zakynthos International Airport. The aircraft had taken off from its base at Araxos Air Base on a training flight when it experienced a mechanical issue, and the pilot elected to divert to Zakynthos. The pilot escaped uninjured, but fire engulfed the F-16 on the ground.
- On 17 September 2026, an F-16 training unit belonging to the 149th Fighter Wing crashed in Grand Traverse County, Michigan. The pilot ejected safely.
- On 22 September 2026, while on approach to its home base at Spangdahlem Air Base, F-16C (AF Serial No. 96-0083) of the 52nd Fighter Wing / 480th Fighter Squadron crashed approximately 400 m short of the runway. The pilot ejected successfully, but the aircraft was destroyed.

== Aircraft on display ==
As newer variants have entered service, many examples of older F-16 models have been preserved for display worldwide, particularly in Europe and the United States.

== Specifications (F-16C Block 50 and 52) ==
3-view drawing of an F-16

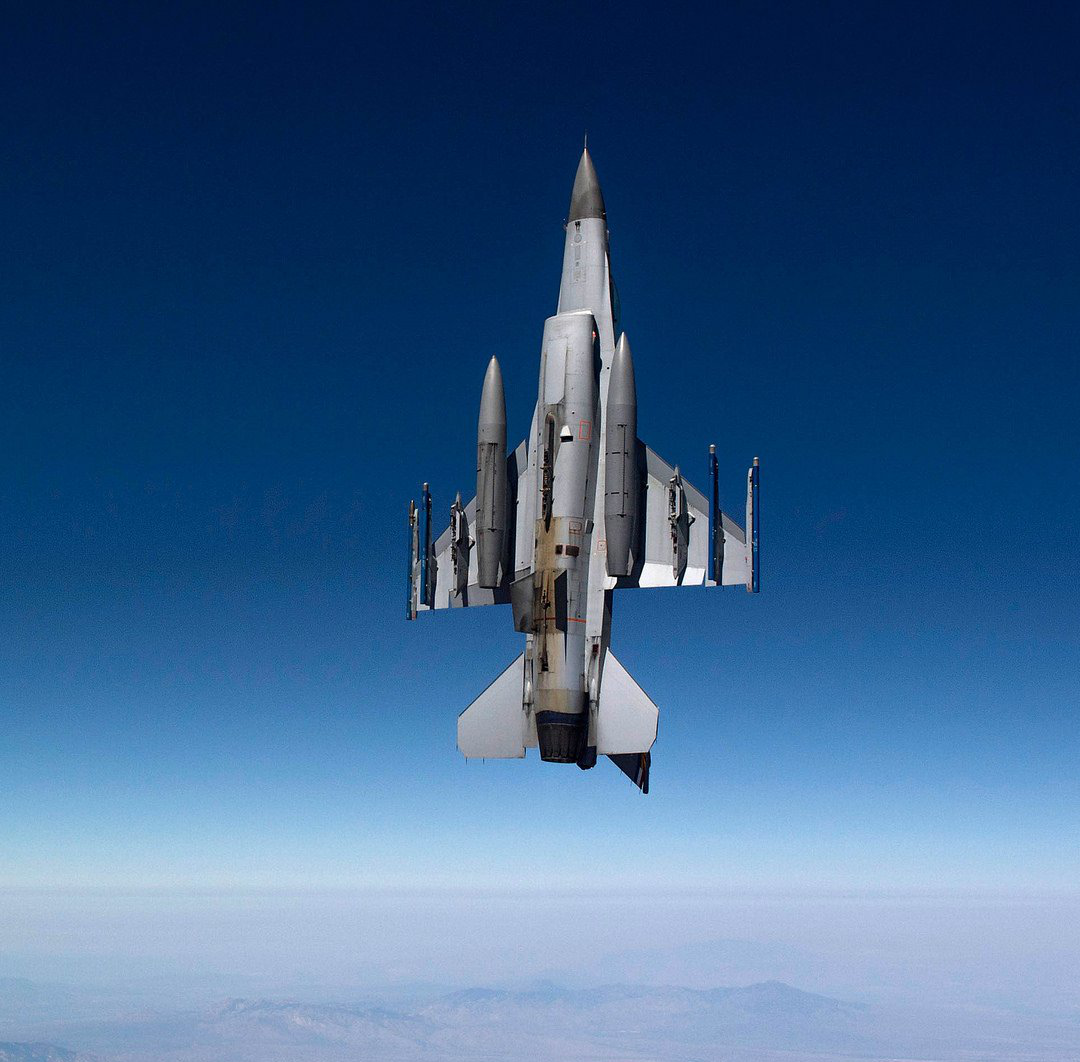
The underside of an F-16 during a vertical climb

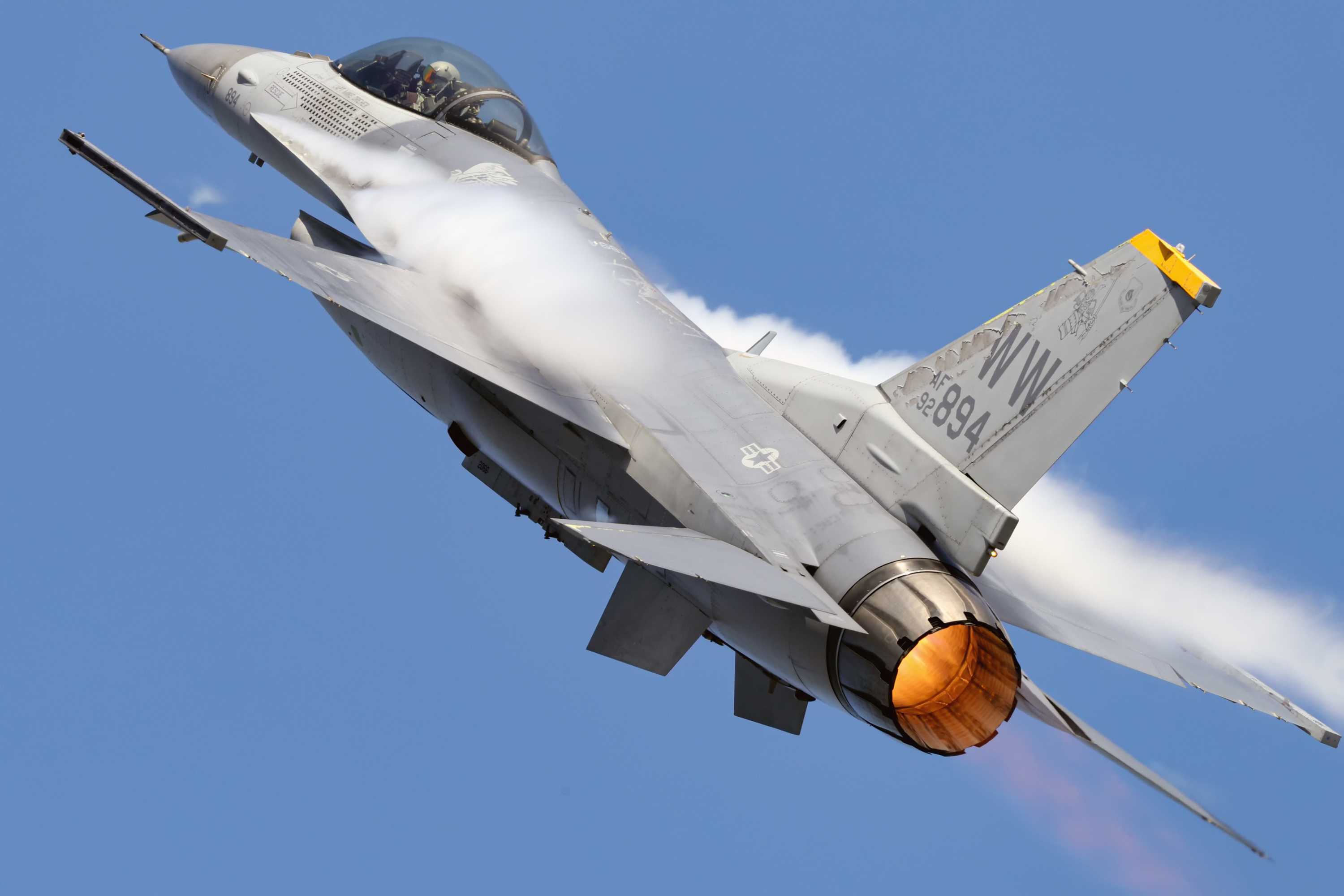
F-16 in afterburner

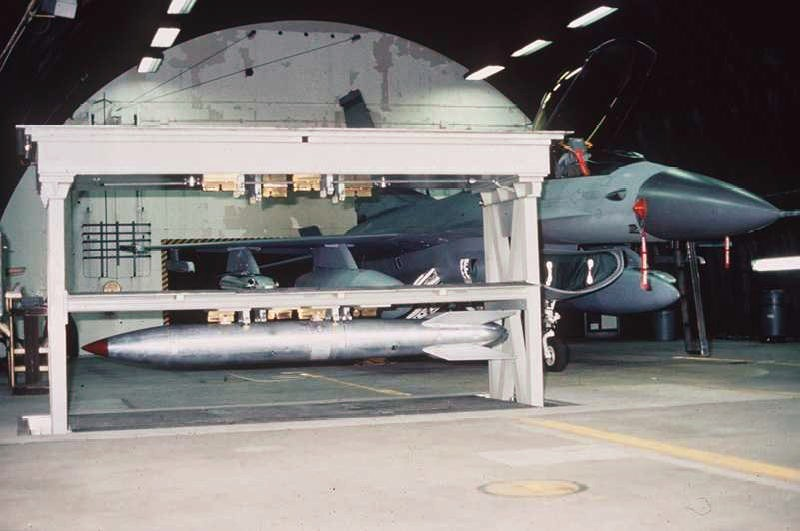
Weapons Storage and Security System vault in raised position holding a B61 nuclear bomb, adjacent to an F-16. The vault is within a Protective Aircraft Shelter.

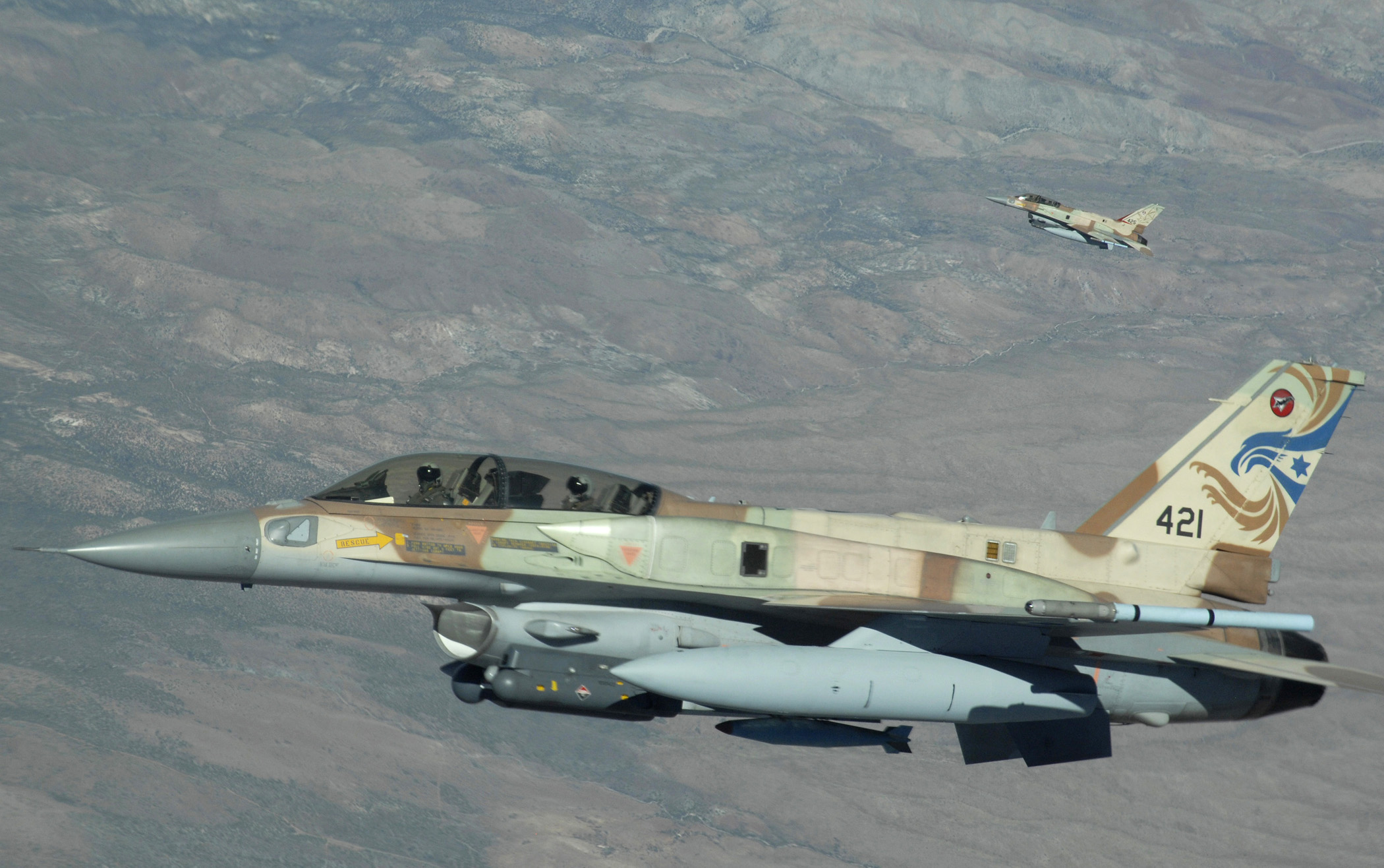
An Israeli F-16I Block 52 with conformal fuel tanks (CFTs), electronic countermeasures, and other external stores during a Red Flag exercise at Nellis AFB, Nevada

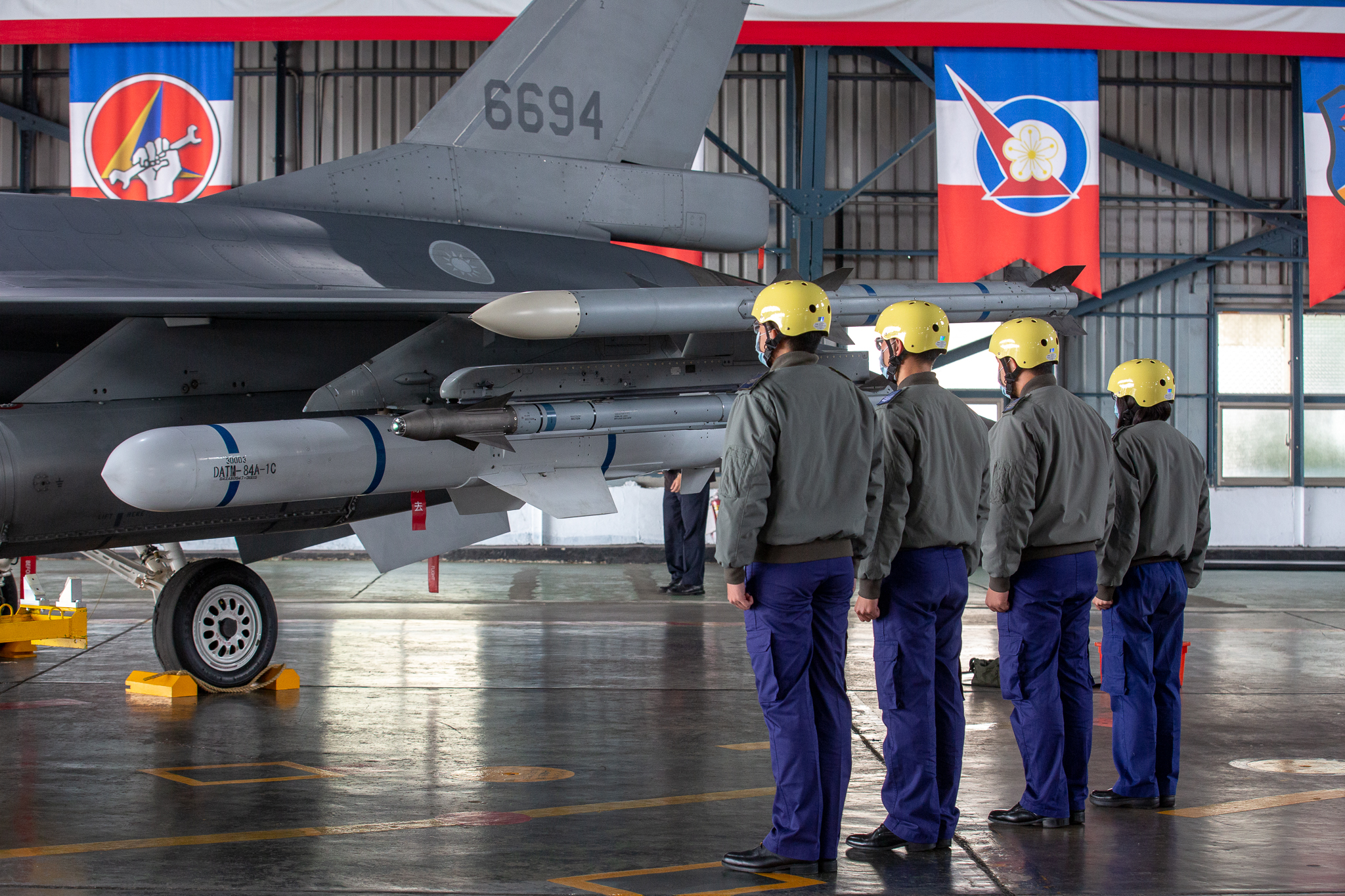
A view of an AGM-84 Harpoon air-to-surface anti-ship missile fixed under the wing of an F-16 of the Republic of China Air Force

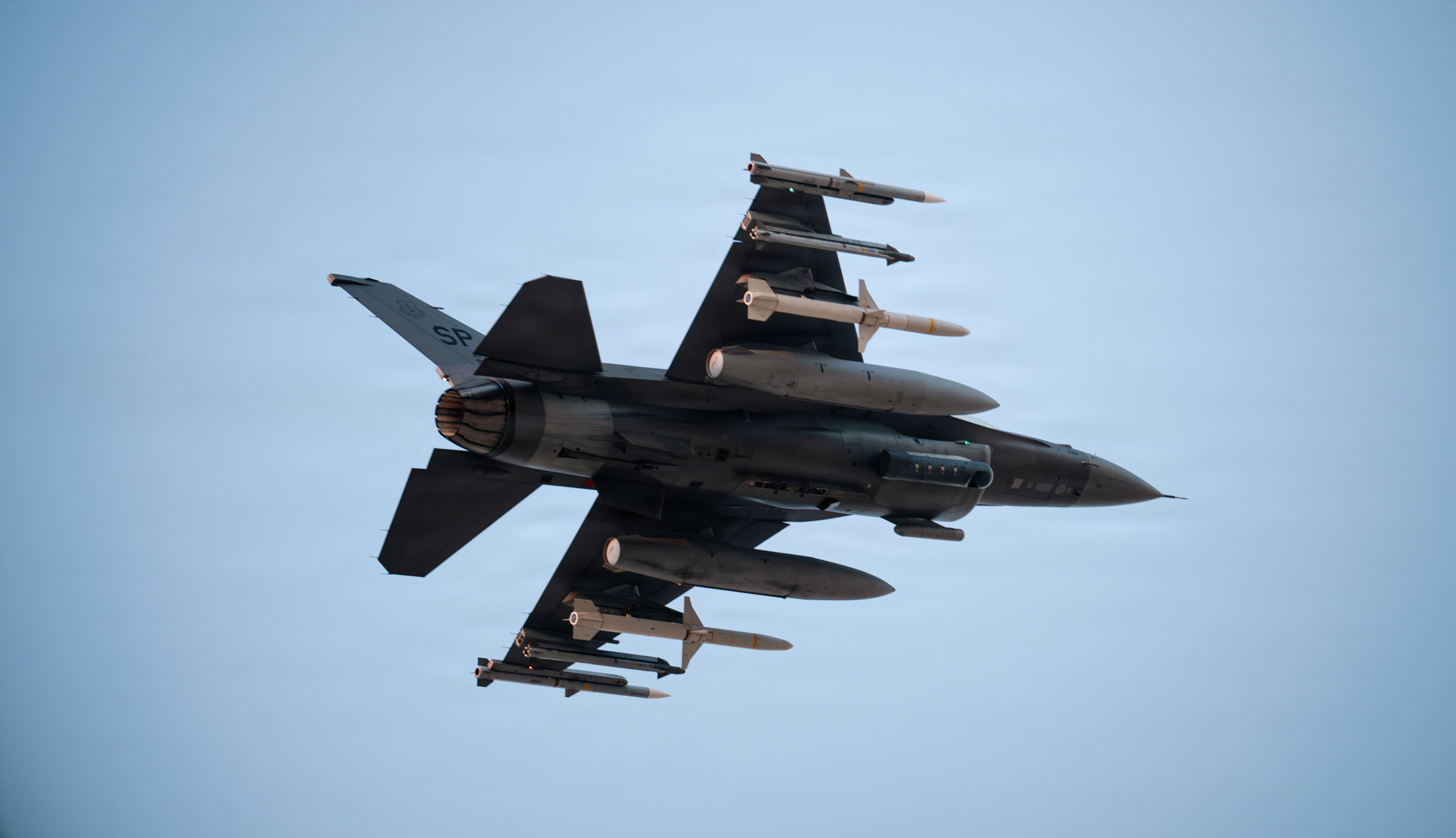
F-16 armed with AGM-88 HARMs, AIM-9X Sidewinders, and AIM-120 AMRAAMs during Operation Epic Fury

Data from USAF sheet, International Directory of Military Aircraft, Flight Manual for F-16C/D Block 50/52+

General characteristics

- Crew: 1
- Length: 49 ft 5 in (15.06 m)
- Wingspan: 32 ft 8 in (9.96 m)
- Height: 16 ft (4.9 m)
- Wing area: 300 sq ft (28 m^{2})
- Airfoil: NACA 64A204
- Empty weight: 18,900 lb (8,573 kg)
- Gross weight: 26,500 lb (12,020 kg)
- Max takeoff weight: 42,300 lb (19,187 kg)
- Fuel capacity: 7,000 pounds (3,200 kg) internal
- Powerplant: 1 × General Electric F110-GE-129 for Block 50 aircraft , 17,155 lbf (76.31 kN) thrust dry, 29,500 lbf (131 kN) with afterburner
  (1 × Pratt & Whitney F100-PW-229 for Block 52 aircraft, 17,800 lbf (79 kN) thrust dry and 29,160 lbf (129.7 kN) with afterburner.)

Performance

- Maximum speed: Mach 2.05, 1,176 kn (1,353 mph; 2,178 km/h) at 40,000 feet, clean
  - Mach 1.2, 800 kn (921 mph; 1,482 km/h) at sea level
- Cruise speed: 504 kn (580 mph, 933 km/h)
- Combat range: 295 nmi (339 mi, 546 km) on a hi-lo-hi mission with 4 × 1,000 lb (454 kg) bombs
- Ferry range: 2,277 nmi (2,620 mi, 4,217 km) with three drop tanks
- Service ceiling: 50,000 ft (15,000 m)
- g limits: +9
- Roll rate: 324°/s
- Wing loading: 88.3 lb/sq ft (431 kg/m^{2})
- Thrust/weight: 1.095 (1.24 with loaded weight & 50% internal fuel) (Note: Thrust (28,600 lb) / Loaded weight with 50% internal fuel (23,000 lb))

Armament

- Guns: 1 × 20 mm (0.787 in) M61A1 Vulcan 6-barrel rotary cannon, 500 rounds
- Hardpoints: 2 × wing-tip air-to-air missile launch rails, 6 × under-wing, and 3 × under-fuselage pylon (2 of 3 for sensors) stations with a capacity of up to 17,000 lb (7,700 kg) of stores
- Rockets:
  - 4 × LAU-61/LAU-68 rocket pods (each with 19/7 × Hydra 70 mm/APKWS rockets, respectively)
  - 4 × LAU-5003 rocket pods (each with 19 × CRV7 70 mm rockets)
  - 4 × LAU-10 rocket pods (each with 4 × Zuni 127 mm rockets)
- Missiles:
  - Air-to-air missiles:
    - 6 × AIM-9 Sidewinder
    - 6 × AIM-120 AMRAAM
    - 6 × IRIS-T
    - 6 × Python-4
    - 6 × Python-5
    - 2 × AIM-7 Sparrow and 4 × AIM-9 Sidewinder
  - Air-to-surface missiles:
    - 6 × AGM-65 Maverick
    - 2 × AGM-88 HARM
    - AGM-158 JASSM (JASSM)
  - Anti-ship missiles:
    - 2 × AGM-84 Harpoon
    - 4 × AGM-119 Penguin
    - Joint Strike Missile (to be integrated)
- Bombs:
  - 8 × CBU-87 Combined Effects Munition
  - 8 × CBU-89 Gator mine
  - 8 × CBU-97 Sensor Fuzed Weapon
  - 4 × Mark 84 general-purpose bombs
  - 8 × Mark 83 GP bombs
  - 12 × Mark 82 GP bombs
  - 8 × GBU-39 Small Diameter Bomb (SDB)
  - 4 × GBU-10 Paveway II
  - 6 × GBU-12 Paveway II
  - 4 × GBU-24 Paveway III
  - 4 × GBU-27 Paveway III
  - 4 × Joint Direct Attack Munition (JDAM) series
  - 4 × AGM-154 Joint Standoff Weapon (JSOW)
  - Wind Corrected Munitions Dispenser (WCMD)
  - B61 nuclear bomb
  - B83 nuclear bomb
- Others:
  - ADM-160 MALD
  - AN/ALE-47 flares/infrared decoys dispenser pod and chaff pod or
  - AN/ALQ-131 & AN/ALQ-184 ECM pods on centerline or
  - LANTIRN, Lockheed Martin Sniper XR & Litening targeting pods or
  - AN/ASQ-213 HARM targeting system (HTS) Pod (typically configured on station 5L with Sniper XR pod on station 5R) or
  - Up to 3 × 300/330/370/600 US gallon (1,135, 1,250, 1,400, 2,270 L) Sargent Fletcher drop tanks for ferry flight/extended range/loitering time or
  - UTC Aerospace DB-110 long range EO/IR sensor pod on centerline

Avionics

- AN/APG-68 radar
- AN/ALR-56M radar warning receiver, being replaced on US Air Force F-16C/D Block 40/42 and 50/52 by AN/ALR-69A(V)
- AN/ALQ-213 electronic warfare suite, being replaced on US Air Force F-16C/D Block 40/42 and 50/52 by AN/ALQ-257
- MIL-STD-1553 bus

== See also ==
- Aircraft in fiction § F-16 Fighting Falcon
- Fourth-generation fighter
- Green Ramp disaster
- David S. Lewis (General Dynamics' CEO during formative period for F-16)
- RSAF Black Knights – F-16 Aerobatic Team

Related development

- Vought Model 1600
- General Dynamics F-16XL
- General Dynamics X-62 VISTA
- AIDC F-CK-1 Ching-kuo
- KAI T-50 Golden Eagle
- Mitsubishi F-2

Aircraft of comparable role, configuration, and era

- Chengdu J-10
- Dassault Mirage 2000
- McDonnell Douglas F/A-18 Hornet
- Mikoyan MiG-29
- HAL Tejas
- PAC/CAC JF-17 Thunder
- Saab JAS 39 Gripen

Related lists

- List of active United States military aircraft
- List of fighter aircraft
- List of military electronics of the United States
