= Dassault Rafale =

Multi-role combat aircraft family by Dassault

Rafale
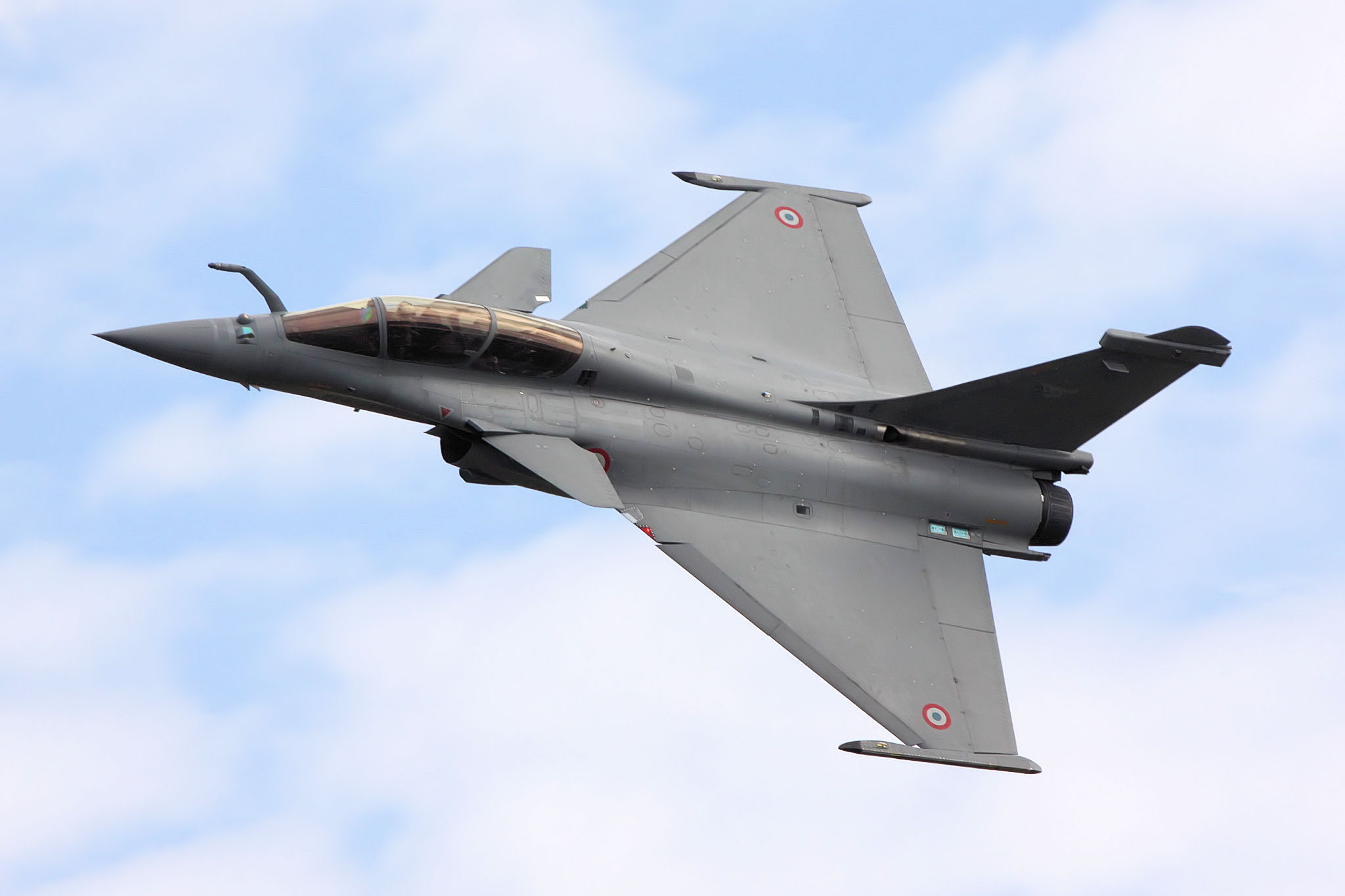
- A French Air Force Dassault Rafale B at Royal International Air Tattoo (RIAT) in 2009

General information
- Type: Multirole fighter
- National origin: France
- Manufacturer: Dassault Aviation
- Status: In service
- Primary users: French Air and Space Force French Navy; Egyptian Air Force; Indian Air Force; See Operators below for others
- Number built: 316 / 647

History
- Manufactured: 1986–present
- Introduction date: 18 May 2001 (navy)
- First flight: Rafale A demo: 4 July 1986; Rafale C: 19 May 1991

The Dassault Rafale (French: [ʁafal], literally meaning "gust of wind", or "burst of fire" in a more military sense) is a French twin-engine, canard delta wing, multirole fighter aircraft designed and built by Dassault Aviation. Equipped with a wide range of weapons, the Rafale is intended to perform air supremacy, interdiction, aerial reconnaissance, ground support, in-depth strike, anti-ship strike and nuclear deterrence missions. Dassault markets the aircraft as an "omnirole" fighter due to its ability to perform multiple distinct mission roles during a single sortie.

In the late 1970s, the French Air Force and French Navy sought to replace and consolidate their existing fleets of aircraft. In order to reduce development costs and boost prospective sales, France entered into an arrangement with the UK, Germany, Italy and Spain to produce an agile multi-purpose "Future European Fighter Aircraft" (which would become the Eurofighter Typhoon). Subsequent disagreements over workshare and differing requirements led France to pursue its own development programme. Dassault built a technology demonstrator that first flew in July 1986 as part of an eight-year flight-test programme, paving the way for approval of the project.

The Rafale is distinct from other European fighters of its era in that it is almost entirely built by one country, France, involving most of France's major defence contractors, such as Dassault, Thales and Safran. Many of the aircraft's avionics and features, such as direct voice input, the RBE2 AA active electronically scanned array (AESA) radar and the optronique secteur frontal infra-red search and track (IRST) sensor, were domestically developed and produced for the Rafale programme. Originally scheduled to enter service in 1996, the Rafale suffered significant delays due to post-Cold War budget cuts and changes in priorities. There are three main variants: Rafale C single-seat land-based version, Rafale B twin-seat land-based version, and Rafale M single-seat carrier-based version.

Introduced in 2001, the Rafale is being produced for both the French Air Force and for carrier-based operations in the French Navy. It has been marketed for export to several countries, and was selected for purchase by the Egyptian Air Force, the Indian Air Force, the Indian Navy, the Qatar Air Force, the Hellenic Air Force, the Croatian Air Force, the Indonesian Air Force, the United Arab Emirates Air Force and the Serbian Air Force. The Rafale is considered one of the most advanced and capable warplanes in the world, and among the most successful internationally. It has been used in combat over Afghanistan, Libya, Mali, Iraq, Syria, and by India near its border with Pakistan.

== Development ==
=== Background ===
In the mid-1970s, the French Air Force (Armée de l'Air) and French Navy (Marine Nationale) had separate requirements for a new generation of fighters to replace those in or about to enter service. Because their requirements were similar, and to reduce cost, both services issued a common request for proposal. In 1975, the country's Ministry of Aviation initiated studies for a new aircraft to complement the upcoming and smaller Dassault Mirage 2000, with each aircraft optimized for differing roles.

The Rafale aircraft development programme was the end product of efforts by various European countries for a common fighter aircraft. In 1979, Dassault-Breguet (later Dassault Aviation) joined the MBB/BAe "European Collaborative Fighter" project which was renamed the "European Combat Aircraft" (ECA). The company contributed the aerodynamic layout of a prospective twin-engine, single-seat fighter; however, the project collapsed in 1981 due to differing operational requirements of each partner country. In 1983, the "Future European Fighter Aircraft" (FEFA) programme was initiated, bringing together France, Italy, Spain, West Germany and the United Kingdom to jointly develop a new fighter, although the latter three had their own aircraft developments. French officials envisioned a lightweight, multirole aircraft that—in addition to fulfilling both air force and naval roles—it was believed, would be attractive on the export fighter market. This was in contrast to the British requirement for a heavy long-range interceptor. France also demanded a lead role, with the commensurate technical and industrial primacy, whereas the other countries were accepting of a more egalitarian programme structure. (Note: Quote: "Dassault demands design leadership as the price for European co-operation.")

There was little common ground between France and the other members of this project, but by 1983, the five countries had agreed on a European Staff Target for a future fighter. Nevertheless, differences persisted, and so France withdrew from the multilateral talks in July 1985 to preserve the technological independence of its fighter aircraft industry. West Germany, the UK and Italy opted out and established a new European Fighter Aircraft (EFA) programme. In Turin, on 2 August 1985, West Germany, the UK and Italy agreed to go ahead with the EFA, and confirmed that France, along with Spain, had chosen not to proceed as a member of the project. Despite pressure from France, Spain rejoined the EFA project in early September 1985. The four-nation project eventually resulted in the Eurofighter Typhoon's development.

Rafale logo

In France, the government proceeded with its own programme. The Ministry of Defence required an aircraft capable of air-to-air and air-to-ground, all-day and adverse weather operations. As France was the sole developer of the Rafale's airframe, avionics, propulsion system and armament, the resultant aircraft was to replace a multitude of aircraft in the French Armed Forces. The Rafale would perform roles previously filled by an assortment of specialised platforms, including the Jaguar, Mirage F1C/CR/CT, Mirage 2000C/-5/N in the French Air Force, and the F-8P Crusader, Étendard IVP/M and Super Étendard in French Naval Aviation.

=== Demonstration ===
At the same time as the multinational talks were occurring, Dassault-Breguet had been busy designing its Avion de Combat Experimental (ACX). During late 1978, prior to France's joining of the ECA, Dassault received contracts for the development of project ACT 92 (Avion de Combat Tactique, meaning "Tactical Combat Airplane"). The following year, the National Office for Aviation Studies and Research began studying the possible configurations of the new fighter under the codename Rapace ("Bird of Prey"). By March 1980, the number of configurations had been narrowed down to four, two of which had a combination of canards, delta wings and a single vertical tail-fin. The ACX project was given political impetus when the French government awarded a contract for two (later reduced to one) technology demonstrator aircraft on 13 April 1983. The government and industry would each provide half of the development cost, with first flight to take place in 1986. At the time, there was no guarantee that the effort would result in a full-scale development programme, and the aircraft remained a purely "proof-of concept" test vehicle. In an effort to harmonize design specifics with the requirements of other countries while collaboration talks were being held, Dassault sized the ACX aircraft in the 9.5 tonne range. After France decided to pull out of the multilateral talks, designers focused on a more compact size, as specified by the Air Force. The ACX programme was renamed Rafale ("squall") in April 1985.

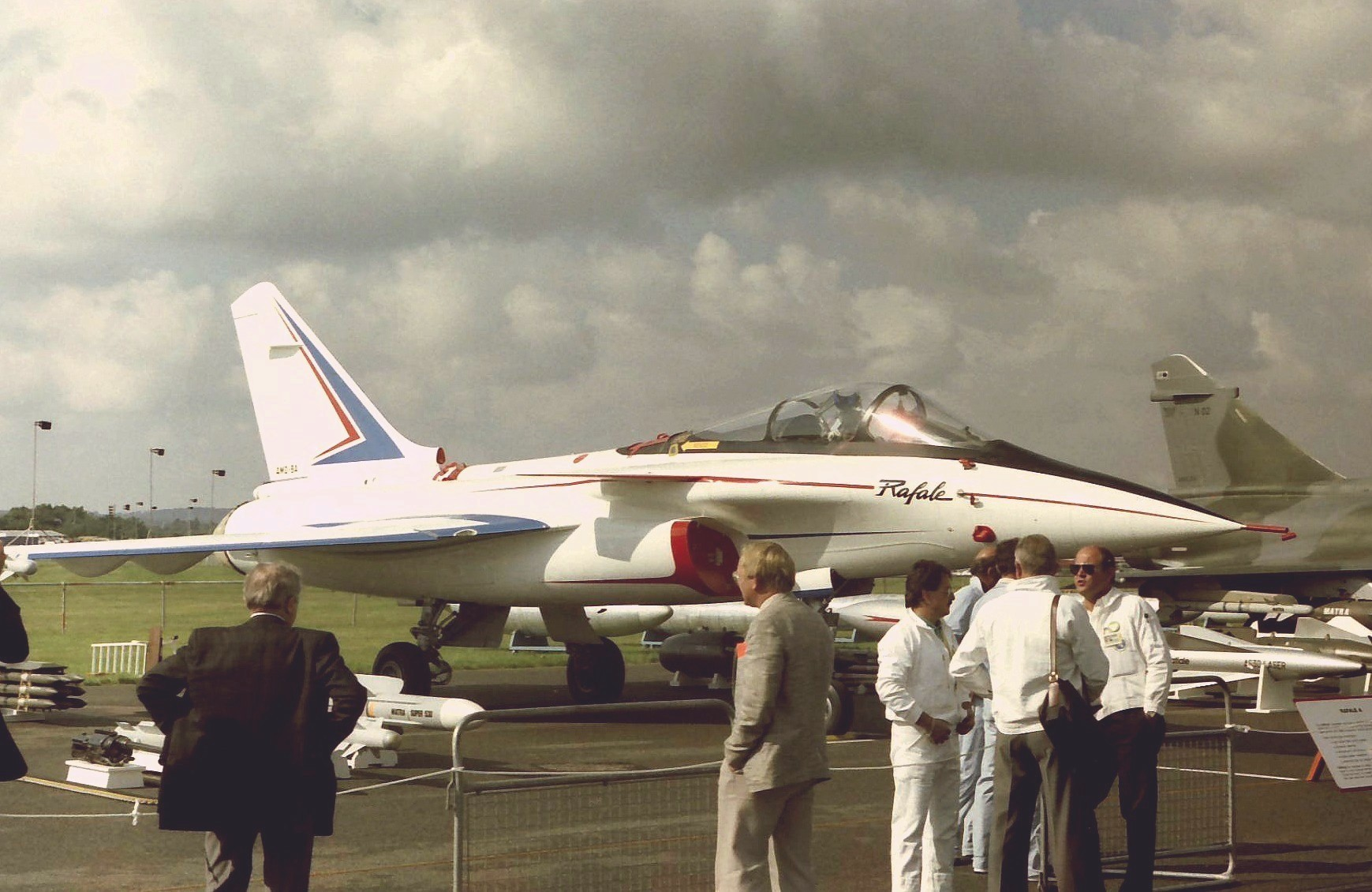
The Dassault Rafale A technology demonstrator

Construction of the Rafale A (ACX) technology demonstrator started in 1984. It had a length of 15.8 m (52 ft), a wingspan of 11 m (36 ft), and a 9.5 t (21,000 lb) empty weight. The austere aircraft lacked in major subsystems, and had the minimal cockpit systems and a fly-by-wire flight control system for the validation of the design's basic airframe-engine layout. The company desired to use the Rafale A to continue the company approach of risk reduction through incremental improvement and to test the aerodynamically unstable delta wing-canard configuration.The aircraft was Dassault's 92nd prototype in 40 years. At the time of its construction, the aircraft had two 68.8 kN (15,500 lbf) General Electric F404 engines that were then in service with the F/A-18 Hornet, pending the availability of the Snecma M88 turbofan engines. It was rolled out in December 1985 at Saint-Cloud, and on 4 July 1986, made its first flight from the company's Istres test facility in southern France, piloted by Guy Mitaux-Maurouard. During the one-hour flight, the aircraft reached an altitude of 11,000 m (36,000 ft) and a speed of Mach 1.3. The aircraft participated in the Farnborough air show the following month.

The aircraft participated in an intensive flight test programme that saw it simulate air force and naval operations. The test vehicle flew approaches to the carrier Clemenceau, and also tested for coordination with Foch. By 1987, the aircraft had been flown by Air Force, Navy and CEV test pilots. Its port-side F404 engine was replaced with the 72.9 kN (16,400 lbf) M88 in early 1990, and the aircraft flew under the updated powerplant configuration in May 1990. The aircraft thereafter attained a speed of Mach 1.4 without the use of engine reheat, thereby demonstrating supercruise. The Rafale A was used until January 1994, and was retired after 867 sorties.

The early successful demonstration programme increased French industry and government confidence in the viability of a full-scale development programme for the Rafale. In June 1987, French prime minister Jacques Chirac declared that the government would proceed with the project. A contract for four pre-production aircraft (one Rafale C, two Rafale Ms and one Rafale B) was awarded on 21 April 1988 for a test and validation programme. There was nevertheless government uncertainty in the programme, as it was expected to cost some Ffr120 billion (1988 francs) in total development and procurement costs. Prime minister Michel Rocard was concerned about the state of the project and the failure of the previous government to secure cooperation with other countries, but stated that, "It is inconceivable that we should not be able to build the weapons necessary for our independence". France had earlier entered unsuccessful talks with Belgium, Denmark, the Netherlands, and Norway, about the possible collaboration on the project.

=== Testing ===
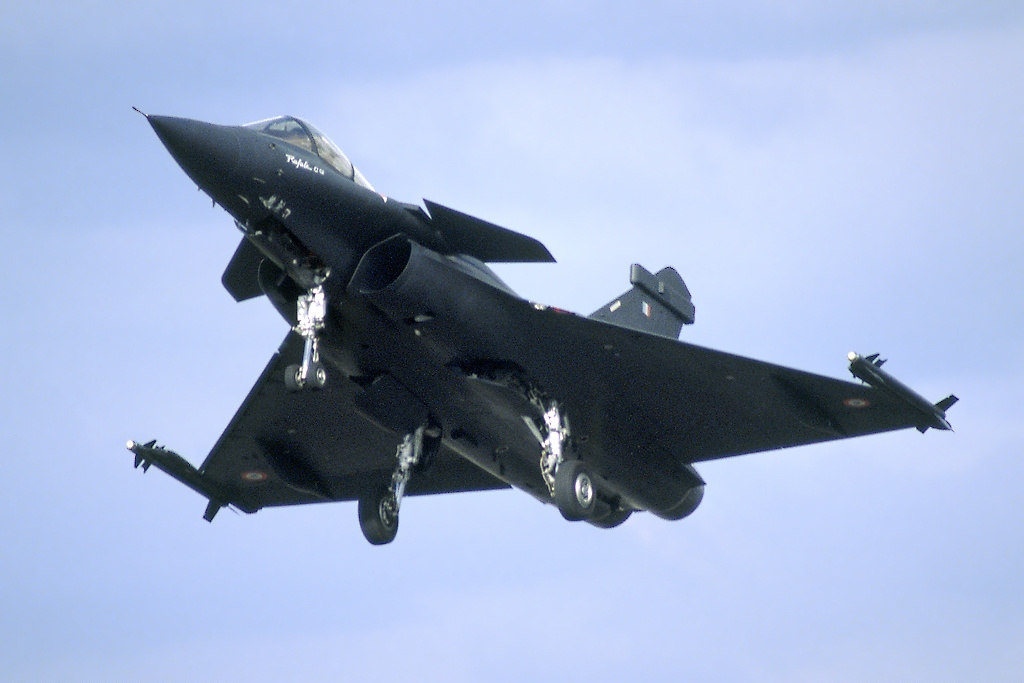
The Rafale C preproduction aircraft

To meet the various roles expected of the new aircraft, the Air Force required two variants: the single-seat Rafale C (chasseur, meaning "fighter") and the Rafale B (biplace, "two-seater"). Its first flight on 19 May 1991 occurred at the company's test facility in Istres. This signalled the start of a test programme which primarily aimed to test the M88-2 engines, human-machine interface and weapons, and expand the flight envelope. Due to budgetary constraints, the second single-seat prototype was never built. The aircraft differed significantly from the Rafale A demonstrator. Although superficially similar to the heavier test vehicle, the aircraft was smaller, with a length of 15.3 m (50 ft) and a wingspan of 10.9 m (36 ft).It was less detectable by radar due to the canopy being gold-plated and the addition of radar-absorbent materials; Dassault had also removed the dedicated airbrake. The sole Rafale B two-seat preproduction aircraft, B01, made its first flight on 30 April 1993, and served as a platform for testing of weapons and fire-control systems, including the RBE2 radar and the SPECTRA electronic warfare suite.

The first of two Rafale M (maritime, "naval") prototypes, M01, made its maiden flight on 12 December 1991, followed by the second on 8 November 1993. These aircraft differed from the air force variants in having reinforced structure to allow the aircraft to operate aboard ships, and provision for a tail hook and an in-built ladder, which increased the weight of the Rafale M by 500 kg (1,100 lb) over other production variants. Since France has no land-based catapult test facility, catapult trials were carried out in mid-1992 and early 1993 at the United States Navy facility at NAS Lakehurst, New Jersey. The aircraft then carried out shipboard trials aboard Foch in April 1993. The aircraft conducted landings and launches from the nuclear-powered aircraft carrier Charles de Gaulle in July 1999. Testing showed that the aircraft had the ability to land with significant loads of unexpended ordnance.

=== Production ===
The Rafale B was initially expected to be just a trainer, but the Gulf War showed that a second crew member was invaluable on strike and reconnaissance missions. The Air Force therefore switched its preferences towards the two-seater, and planned that the variant would constitute 60 percent of the Rafale fleet. The service originally planned to order 250 Rafales, later reduced to 234 aircraft, 95 "C" and 139 "B" models" and then to 212 aircraft. The Navy originally planned to order 86 Rafales, which was reduced to 60 due to budget cuts, 25 M single-seaters and 35 two-seat Ns. The two-seater was later cancelled.

The ACX and subsequent production Rafale was designed in a "virtual" format. Dassault used the experience and technical expertise of its sister company Dassault Systèmes, which had invented the CATIA (Computer Aided Three-dimensional Interactive Application) system, a three-dimensional computer-aided design and computer-aided manufacturing (CAD/CAM) software suite that became standard across the industry. CATIA enabled digitization and efficiency improvements throughout the programme, as it implemented recently developed processes such as digital mockup and product data management (PDM). Engineers worked directly with computers in generating 3D models of the aircraft, and took advantage of the design software in facilitating machine-tool preparation. The system consisted of 15GB databases of each of the Rafale's components, assisting with various aspects of the design, manufacture and through-life support. The computer-aided arrangement also simplified routine maintenance.

Production of the first aircraft series formally started in December 1992, but was suspended in November 1995 due to political and economic uncertainty, and resumed in January 1997 after the Ministry of Defence and Dassault agreed on a 48-aircraft (28 firm and 20 options) production run with delivery between 2002 and 2007. A further order of 59 Rafale F3s was announced in December 2004. In November 2009 the French government ordered an additional 60 aircraft to take the total order for the French Air Force and Navy to 180.

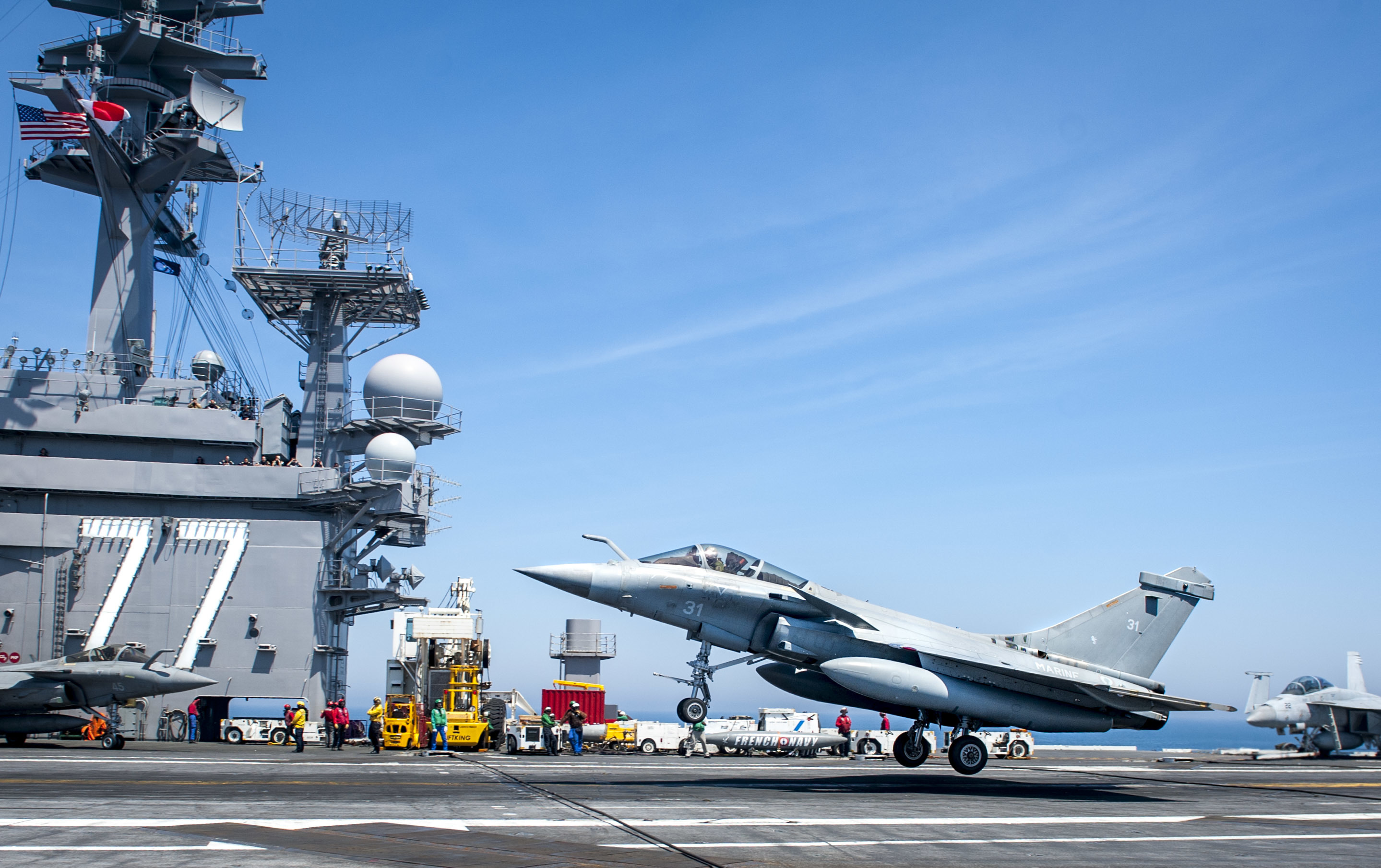
A French Navy Rafale M landing aboard USS George H.W. Bush - 11 May 2018

The Rafale is manufactured almost entirely in France, except for some imported non-sensitive components. Different components are produced in various plants across the country, including the fuselage in Paris, wings in Martignas, and fins in Biarritz, with final assembly taking place in Merignac near Bordeaux. Dassault carries out 60% of the work, its partner Thales 25%, and its other partner Safran 15%. The three companies rely on a network of 500 subcontractors, many of which are small and medium enterprises, providing work for 7,000 direct and indirect employees. As of 2012, each fighter took 24 months to manufacture, with an annual production rate of eleven aircraft.

The Rafale was originally planned to enter service in 1995. The aircraft's development proceeded on time, on budget, and without major difficulties. However, the project needed to compete with other defense acquisition programmes for a dwindling national defense budget. This occurred in a political environment in which the chief security threat, the Soviet Union, no longer existed. The French government consequently reduced Rafale orders, which Dassault and other companies involved claimed impeded production management and led to higher costs, and delayed the entry of the aircraft into service. At one stage, French naval authorities investigated the possibility of acquiring used F/A-18s to replace the obsolete F-8 for its carriers, but the French government intended an all-Rafale fleet, and did not go ahead with the plan. Deliveries of the Rafale M were subsequently given a high priority to replace the Navy's aged F-8 fighters. In the words of a naval official, "Although we lost the battle for the F/A-18s, I guess you could say that we had at least some success by 'persuading' the government to give us initial delivery priority". The first production Rafale B took its first flight on 24 November 1998, followed by the first Rafale M for the French Navy on 7 July 1999.

In March 2025, Dassault Aviation announced an increase in production in anticipation of more orders from France and other countries. The company's chief executive, Eric Trappier, said they plan to deliver three aircraft per month in 2025, increasing to four per month from 2028 to 2029.

On 5 June 2025, Dassault Aviation announced its partnership with India's Tata Advanced Systems (TASL) for the production of Rafale's fuselage in India after signing four Production Transfer Agreements. The manufacturing will be taken up in TASL's Hyderabad facility. The first fuselage will roll out from fiscal year of 2028 with a production rate of two units per month. This will be the first time the Rafale's fuselage is manufactured outside of France. Since earlier, five different parts of Rafale is being manufactured by Dassault Reliance Aerospace Limited (DRAL) in Nagpur, India.

=== Upgrades and replacement ===
The Rafale has been designed with an open software architecture that facilitates straightforward upgrades. Dassault and its industry partners have therefore undertaken continuous tests and development primarily aimed at progressively improving the aircraft's sensors and avionics, and to allow additional armament integration. In 2011, upgrades under consideration included a software radio and satellite link, a new laser-targeting pod, smaller bombs and enhancements to the aircraft's data-fusion capacity. In July 2012, fleetwide upgrades of the Rafale's battlefield communications and interoperability capabilities commenced.

At one stage, French officials were reportedly considering equipping the Rafale to launch miniaturised satellites.

In January 2014, the defence ministry announced that funds had been allocated towards the development of the F3R standard. The standard includes the integration of the Meteor BVR missile, among other weapons and software updates. The standard was validated in 2018.

Development work started on the F4 standard in 2019. The design received radar and sensor upgrades that facilitate the detection of airborne stealth targets at long range, as well as improved capabilities in the helmet-mounted display. With improved communications equipment, it is also more effective in network-centric warfare. Flight tests were conducted starting in 2021 and the first F4-standard aircraft was delivered in 2023. Previous aircraft will be upgraded to the standard, with a further 30 aircraft to be ordered in 2023.

The total programme cost, as of FY2013, was around €45.9 billion, which translated to a unit programme cost of approximately €160.5 million. This figure takes in account improved hardware of the F3 standard, and which includes development costs over a period of 40 years, including inflation. The unit flyaway price as of 2010 was €101.1 million for the F3+ version.

The F5 standard will have more powerful engines, carry the ASN4G hypersonic nuclear missile, RBE2 XG radar, improved survivability and data links, and will be accompanied by an unmanned combat air vehicle (UCAV) weighing more than ten metric tons (9.8 long tons; 11 short tons).

The Rafale is planned to be the French Air and Space Force's primary combat aircraft until at least 2040. In 2018, Dassault announced the successor to the Rafale as the New Generation Fighter. This fighter aircraft, under development by Dassault Aviation and Airbus Defence and Space, is to replace France's Rafale, Germany's Eurofighter Typhoon, and Spain's F/A-18 Hornet in the 2030–2040 timeframe. In June 2026, it was announced that the NGF had been cancelled due to disputes between the two companies, leaving the Rafale's replacement aircraft uncertain with 14 years left in its role as the primary combat aircraft of the French Air and Space Force.

== Design ==
=== Overview ===
The Rafale was developed as a modern jet fighter with a very high level of agility; Dassault chose to combine a delta wing with active close-coupled canard to maximize maneuverability. The aircraft is capable of withstanding from −3.6 g to 9 g (10.5 g on Rafale solo display and a maximum of 11g can be reached in case of emergency). The Rafale is an aerodynamically unstable aircraft and uses digital fly-by-wire flight controls to artificially enforce and maintain stability. (Note: Quote: "Longitudinal stability is moderately negative with a full fly-by-wire digital control system. The system is quadruple redundant with three digital channels and one separately designed analog channel. Design independence between channels is pivotal in preventing fatal flaws simultaneously affecting several channels due to software misconceptions.") The aircraft's canards also act to reduce the minimum landing speed to 115 knots (213 km/h; 132 mph); while in flight, airspeeds as low as 15 knots (28 km/h; 17 mph) have been observed during training missions. According to simulations by Dassault, the Rafale has sufficient low speed performance to operate from STOBAR-configured aircraft carriers, and can take off using a ski-jump with no modifications.

The Rafale M features a greatly reinforced undercarriage to cope with the additional stresses of naval landings, an arrestor hook, and "jump strut" nosewheel, which only extends during short takeoffs, including catapult launches. It also features a built-in ladder, carrier-based microwave landing system, and the new fin-tip Telemir system for syncing the inertial navigation system to external equipment. Altogether, the naval modifications of the Rafale M increase its weight by 500 kilograms (1,100 lb) compared to other variants. The Rafale M retains about 95 percent commonality with Air Force variants including, although unusual for carrier-based aircraft, being unable to fold its multi-spar wings to reduce storage space. The size constraints were offset by the introduction of Charles de Gaulle, France's first nuclear-powered carrier, which was considerably larger than previous carriers, Foch and Clemenceau.

Although not a full-aspect stealth aircraft, the cost of which was viewed as unacceptably excessive, the Rafale was designed for a reduced radar cross-section (RCS) and infrared signature. In order to reduce the RCS, changes from the initial technology demonstrator include a reduction in the size of the tail-fin, fuselage reshaping, repositioning of the engine air inlets underneath the aircraft's wing, and the extensive use of composite materials and serrated patterns for the construction of the trailing edges of the wings and canards. Seventy percent of the Rafale's surface area is composite. Many of the features designed to reduce the Rafale's visibility to threats remain classified.

=== Cockpit ===
The Rafale's glass cockpit was designed around the principle of data fusion—a central computer selects and prioritises information to display to pilots for simpler command and control. For displaying information gathered from a range of sensors across the aircraft, the cockpit features a wide-angle holographic head-up display (HUD) system, two head-down flat-panel colour multi-function displays (MFDs) as well as a central collimated display. These displays have been strategically placed to minimise pilot distraction from the external environment.< Some displays feature a touch interface for ease of human–computer interaction (HCI). A head-mounted display (HMD) remains to be integrated to take full advantage of its MICA missiles. The cockpit is fully compatible with night vision goggles (NVG). The primary flight controls are arranged in a hands-on-throttle-and-stick (HOTAS)-compatible configuration, with a right-handed side-stick controller and a left-handed throttle. The seat is inclined rearwards at an angle of 29° to improve g-force tolerance during manoeuvring and to provide a less restricted external pilot view.

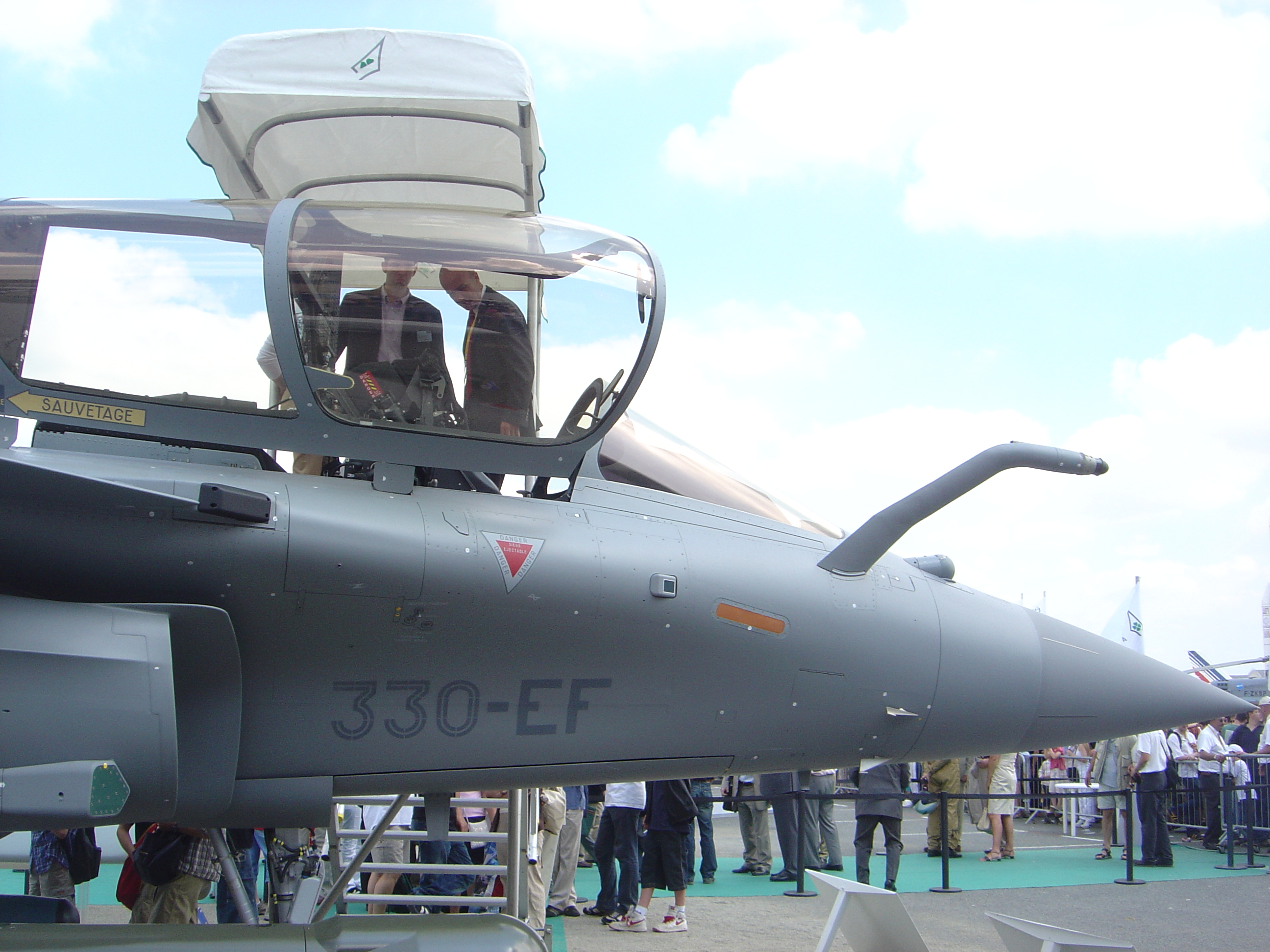
Forward section of Rafale on display at the Paris Air Show, 2005

Great emphasis has been placed on pilot workload minimisation across all operations. Among the features of the highly digitised cockpit is an integrated direct voice input (DVI) system, allowing a range of aircraft functions to be controlled by spoken voice commands, simplifying the pilot's access to many of the controls. For safety reasons, generally DVI is deliberately not employed for safety-critical elements of the aircraft's operation, such as the final release of weapons.

In the area of life support, the Rafale is fitted with a Martin-Baker Mark 16F "zero-zero" ejection seat, capable of operation at zero speed and zero altitude. An on-board oxygen generating system, developed by Air Liquide, eliminates the need to carry bulky oxygen canisters. The Rafale's flight computer has been programmed to counteract pilot disorientation and to employ automatic recovery of the aircraft during negative flight conditions. The auto-pilot and autothrottle controls are also integrated, and are activated by switches located on the primary flight controls. An intelligent flight suit worn by the pilot is automatically controlled by the aircraft to counteract in response to calculated g-forces.

=== Avionics and equipment ===
The Rafale core avionics systems employ an integrated modular avionics (IMA), called MDPU (modular data processing unit). This architecture hosts all the main aircraft functions such as the flight management system, data fusion, fire control, and the man-machine interface. (Note: Quote: "The core of the enhanced capabilities of the RAFALE lies in a new Modular Data Processing Unit (MDPU). It is composed of up to 18 flight line-replaceable modules, each with a processing power 50 times higher than that of the 2084 XRI-type computer fitted on the early versions of Mirage 2000-5.") The total value of the radar, electronic communications and self-protection equipment is about 30 percent of the cost of the entire aircraft. The IMA has since been installed upon several upgraded Mirage 2000 fighters, and incorporated into the civilian airliner, the Airbus A380. According to Dassault, the IMA greatly assists combat operations via data fusion, the continuous integration and analysis of the various sensor systems throughout the aircraft, and has been designed for the incorporation of new systems and avionics throughout the Rafale's service life.

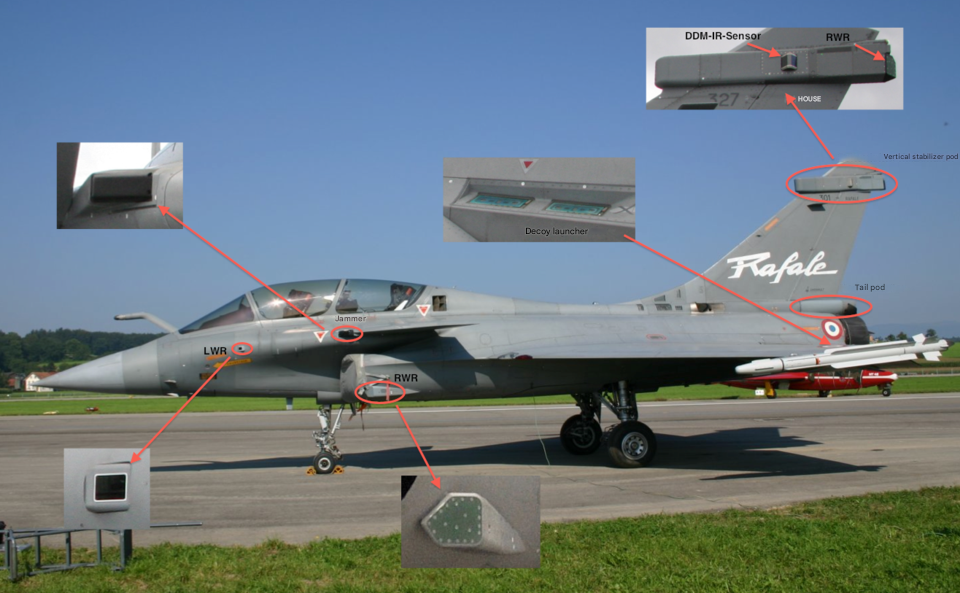
Annotated diagram of SPECTRA's elements

The Rafale features an integrated defensive-aids system named SPECTRA, which protects the aircraft against airborne and ground threats, developed as a joint venture between Thales and MBDA. Various methods of detection, jamming, and decoying have been incorporated, and the system has been designed to be highly reprogrammable for addressing new threats and incorporating additional sub-systems in the future. (Note: Quote: "SPECTRA provides all-weather reliable long-range detection, identification and location of threats, short response times and cutting-edge defensive measures based on combinations of jamming, decoying and evasive manoeuvres and on state-of-the-art technologies such as DRFM (Digital Radio Frequency Memory) signal processing.") Operations over Libya were greatly assisted by SPECTRA, allowing Rafales to perform missions independently from the support of dedicated Suppression of Enemy Air Defences (SEAD) platforms.

The Rafale's ground attack capability is heavily reliant upon sensory targeting pods, such as Thales Optronics's Reco New Generation/Areos reconnaissance pod and Damocles electro-optical/laser designation pod. Together, these systems provide targeting information, enable tactical reconnaissance missions, and are integrated with the Rafale's IMA architecture to provide analysed data feeds to friendly units and ground stations, as well as to the pilot. Damocles provides targeting information to the various armaments carried by the Rafale and is directly integrated with the Rafale's VHF/UHF secure radio to communicate target information with other aircraft. It also performs other key functions such as aerial optical surveillance and is integrated with the navigation system as a FLIR.

The Damocles designation pod was described as "lacking competitiveness" when compared to rivals such as the Sniper and LITENING pods; so work began on an upgraded pod, designated Damocles XF, with additional sensors and added ability to transmit live video feeds. A new Thales targeting pod, the Talios, was officially unveiled at the 2014 Farnborough Air Show and is expected to be integrated on the Rafale by 2018. Thales' Areos reconnaissance pod is an all-weather, night-and-day-capable reconnaissance system employed on the Rafale, and provides a significantly improved reconnaissance capability over preceding platforms. (Note: Quote: "According to DGA, Areos provides day identification capabilities that are two-and-a-half times better than those of the Mirage F1CR's Presto "wet-film" system and 8 times better than those of the legacy SDS250 photo pod of the Super-Étendard.") Areos has been designed to perform reconnaissance under various mission profiles and condition, using multiple day/night sensors and its own independent communications datalinks.

=== Radar and sensors ===
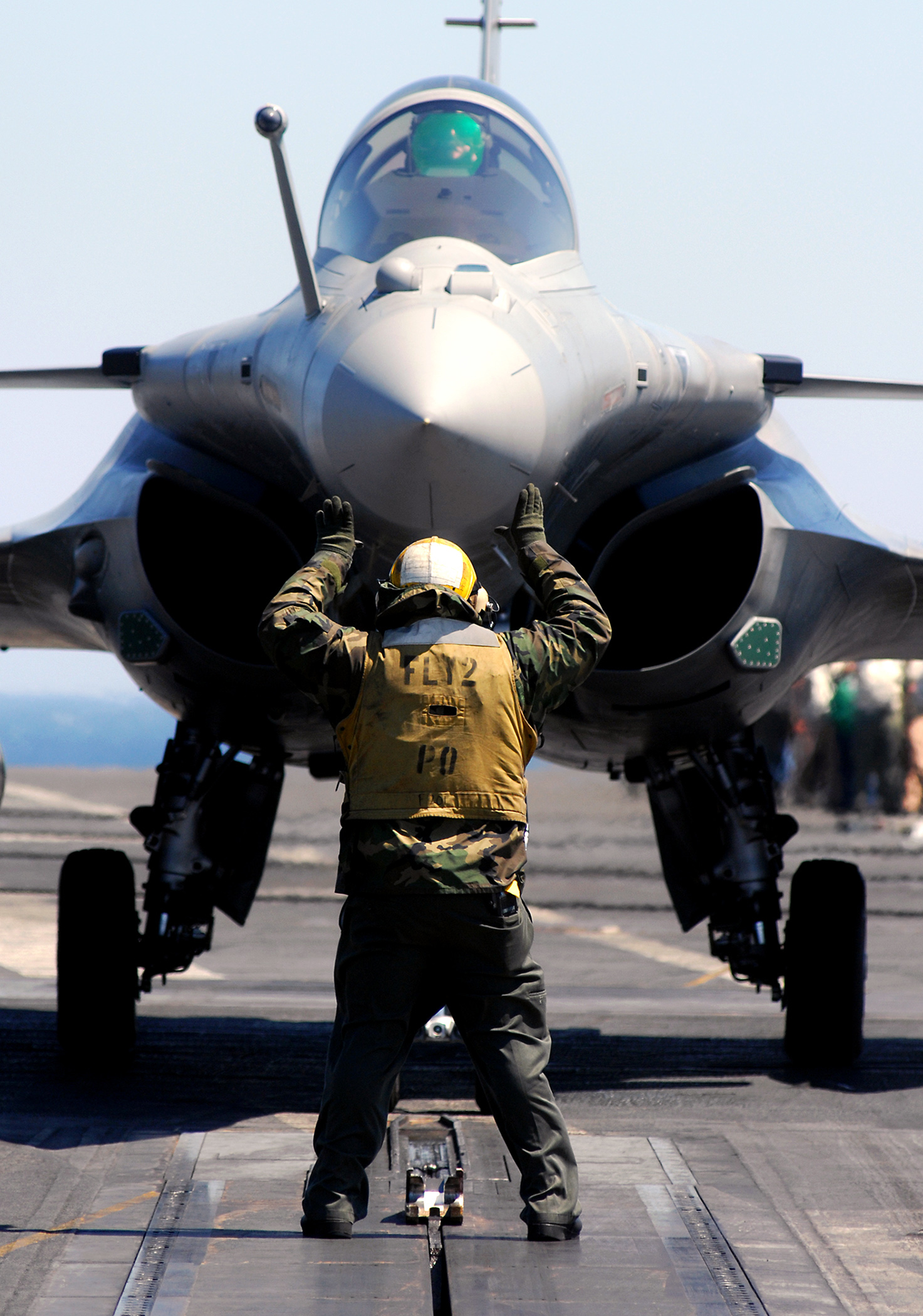
The OSF is visible above the nose cone, below the windscreen and to the side of the refueling probe

The Rafale was first outfitted with the Thales RBE2 passive electronically scanned multi-mode radar. Thales claims to have achieved increased levels of situational awareness as compared to earlier aircraft through the earlier detection and tracking of multiple air targets for close combat and long-range interception, as well as real-time generation of three-dimensional maps for terrain-following and the real-time generation of high resolution ground maps for navigation and targeting. In early 1994, it was reported that technical difficulties with the radar had delayed the Rafale's development by six months. In September 2006, Flight International reported the Rafale's unit cost had significantly increased due to additional development work to improve the RBE2's detection range.

The RBE2 AA active electronically scanned array (AESA) radar now replaces the previous passively scanned RBE2. The RBE2 AA is reported to deliver a greater detection range of 200 km, improved reliability and reduced maintenance demands over the preceding radar. A Rafale demonstrator began test flights in 2002 and has totaled 100 flight hours as of December 2011. By December 2009, production of the pre-series RBE2 AA radars was underway. In early October 2012, the first Rafale equipped with an RBE2 AA radar arrived at Mont-de-Marsan Air Base for operational service (the development was described by Thales and Dassault as "on time and on budget"). By early 2014, the first Air Force front-line squadron were supposed to receive Rafales equipped with the AESA radar, following the French Navy which was slated to receive AESA-equipped Rafales starting in 2013.

To enable the Rafale to perform in the air supremacy role, it includes several passive sensor systems. The front-sector electro-optical system or Optronique Secteur Frontal (OSF), developed by Thales, is completely integrated within the aircraft and can operate both in the visible and infrared wavelengths. The OSF enables the deployment of infrared missiles such as the MICA at beyond visual range distances; it can also be used for detecting and identifying airborne targets, as well as those on the ground and at sea. Dassault describes the OSF as being immune to jamming and capable of providing covert long-range surveillance. In 2012, an improved version of the OSF was deployed operationally.

=== Armament and standards ===
Initial deliveries of the Rafale M were to the F1 ("France 1") standard, which were equipped for the air-to-air interceptor combat duties, but lacked any armament for air-to-ground operations. The F1 standard became operational in 2004. Later deliveries were to the "F2" standard, which added the capability for conducting air-to-ground operations; the first F2 standard Rafale M was delivered to the French Navy in May 2006. Starting in 2008 onwards, Rafale deliveries have been to the nuclear-capable F3 standard that also added reconnaissance with the Areos reconnaissance pod, and it has been reported that all aircraft built to the earlier F1 and F2 standards are to be upgraded to become F3s.

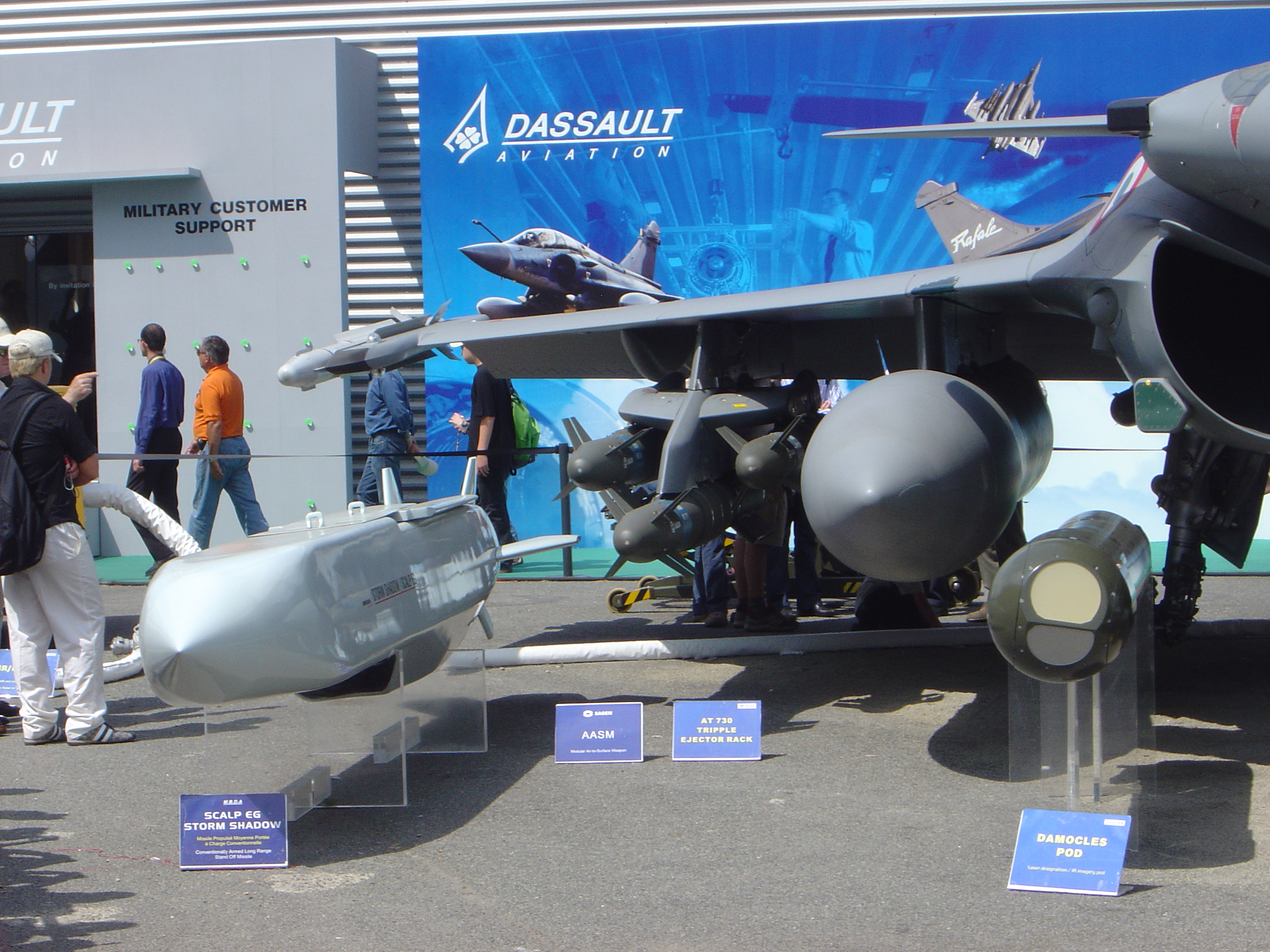
The Rafale's weapons

F3 standard Rafales are capable of undertaking many different mission roles with a range of equipment, namely air defence/superiority missions with Mica IR and EM air-to-air missiles, and precision ground attacks typically using SCALP EG cruise missiles and AASM Hammer air-to-surface missiles. In addition, anti-shipping missions could be carried out using the AM39 Exocet sea skimming missile, while reconnaissance flights would use a combination of onboard and external pod-based sensor equipment. Furthermore, the aircraft could conduct nuclear strikes when armed with ASMP-A missiles. In 2010, France ordered 200 MBDA Meteor beyond-visual-range air-to-air missiles (BVRAAM) which greatly increases the distance at which the Rafale can engage aerial targets.

The F4 standard program was launched on 20 March 2017 by the French ministry of defence. The first F4.1 standard test aircraft was delivered in March 2023.

For compatibility with armaments of varying types and origins, the Rafale's onboard store management system is compliant with MIL-STD-1760, an electrical interface between an aircraft and its carriage stores, thereby simplifying the incorporation of many of their existing weapons and equipment. The Rafale is typically outfitted with 14 hardpoints (only 13 on Rafale M version), five of which are suitable for heavy armament or equipment such as auxiliary fuel tanks, and has a maximum external load capacity of nine tons. In addition to the above equipment, the Rafale carries the 30 mm GIAT 30 revolver cannon and can be outfitted with a range of laser-guided bombs and ground-attack munitions. According to Dassault, the Rafale's onboard mission systems enable ground attack and air-to-air combat operations to be carried out within a single sortie, with many functions capable of simultaneous execution in conjunction with another, increasing survivability and versatility.

=== Engines ===
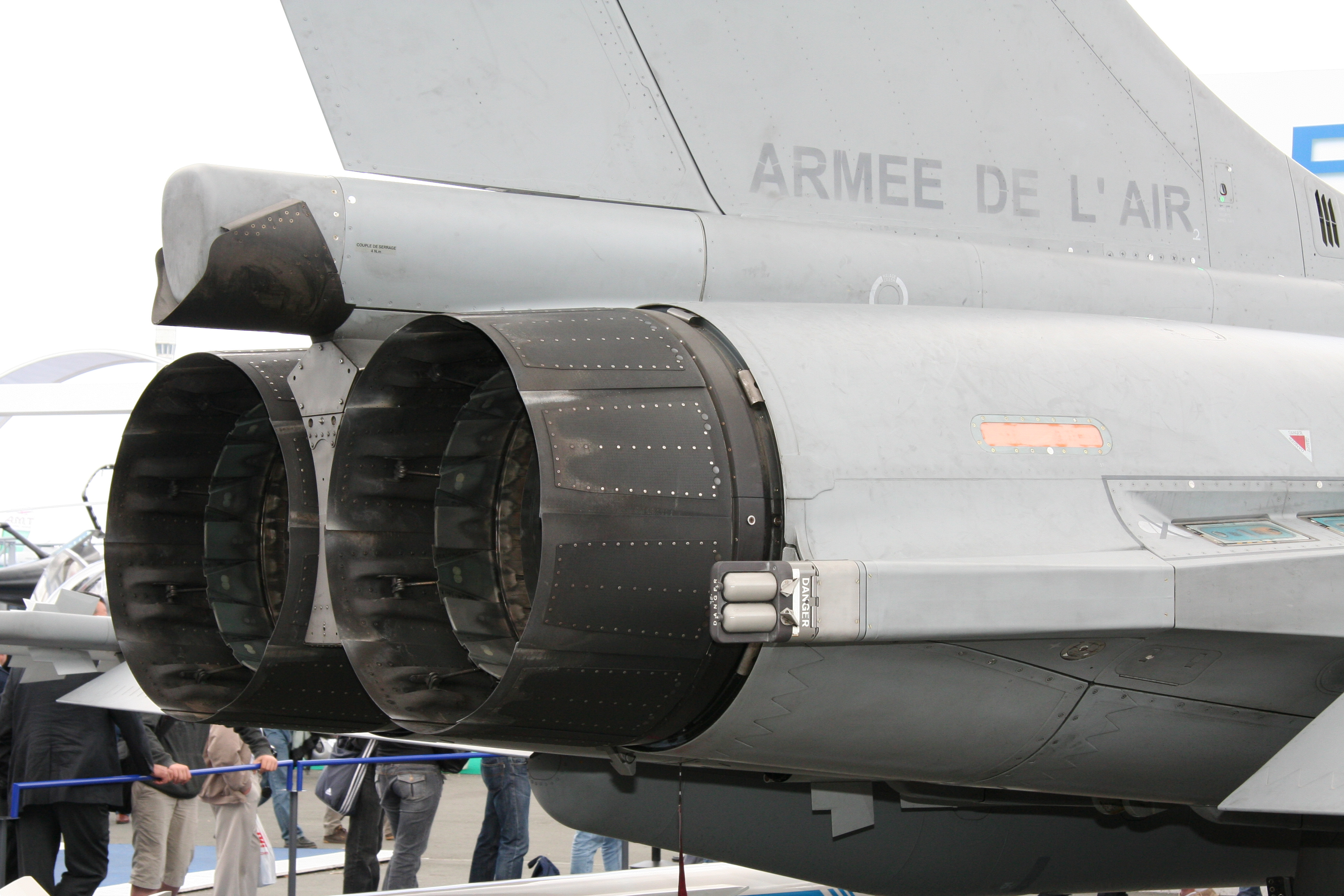
Closeup of the rear of the airframe and the two engine nozzles

The Rafale is fitted with two Snecma M88 engines, each capable of providing up to 50 kilonewtons (11,000 pounds-force) of dry thrust and 75 kN (17,000 lb_{f}) with afterburners. The engines feature several advances, including a non-polluting combustion chamber, single-crystal turbine blades, powder metallurgy disks, and technology to reduce radar and infrared signatures. The M88 enables the Rafale to supercruise while carrying four missiles and one drop tank.

Qualification of the M88-2 engine ended in 1996 and the first production engine was delivered by the end of the year. Due to delays in engine production, the Rafale A demonstrator was initially powered by the General Electric F404 engine. In May 2010, a Rafale flew for the first time with the M88-4E engine, an upgraded variant with lower maintenance requirements than the preceding M88-2. The engine is of a modular design for ease of construction and maintenance and to enable older engines to be retrofitted with improved subsections upon availability, such as existing M88-2s being upgraded to M88-4E standard. There has been interest in more powerful M88 engines by potential export customers, such as the United Arab Emirates (UAE). As of 2007, a thrust vectoring variant of the engine designated as M88-3D was also under development.

== Operational history ==
=== France ===
==== French Naval Aviation ====
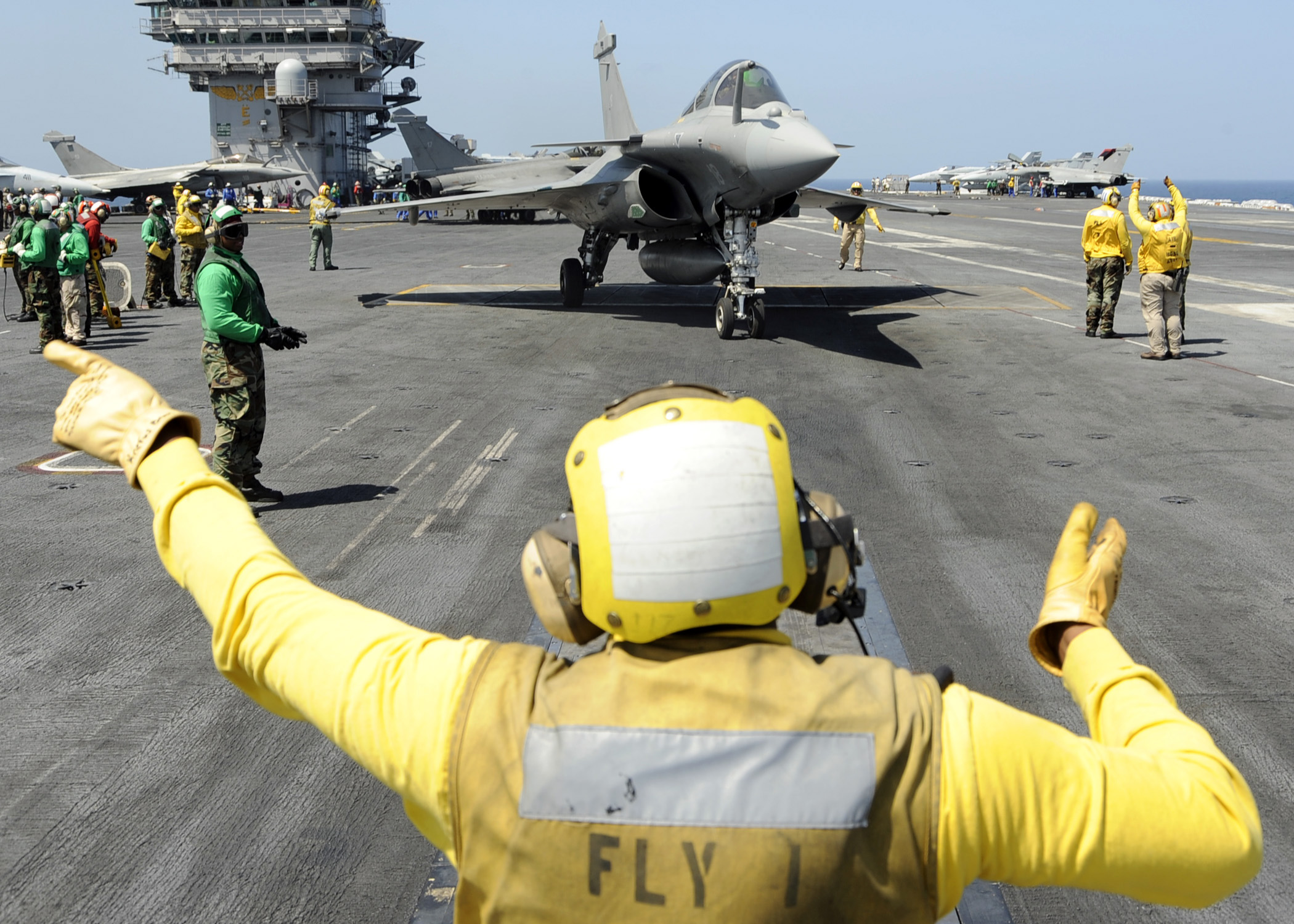
Rafale Ms aboard USS Theodore Roosevelt (CVN-71) in 2008

In December 2000, the French Naval Aviation (Aéronavale), the air arm of the French Navy, received its first two Rafale M fighters. On 18 May the following year, the squadron Flottille 12F, which had previously operated the F-8 Crusader, became the first squadron to operate the Rafale after it was officially re-activated prior to the delivery of the sixth Rafale. Flottille 12F immediately participated in Trident d'Or aboard the aircraft carrier Charles de Gaulle with warships from ten other nations. During the maritime exercise, the Navy tested the Rafale's avionics during simulated interceptions with various foreign aircraft, in addition to carrier take-offs and landings. After almost four years of training, the Rafale M was declared operational with the French Navy in June 2004.

The Rafale M is fully compatible with United States Navy aircraft carriers and some French Navy pilots have qualified to fly the aircraft from US Navy flight decks. On 4 June 2010, during an exercise on USS Harry S. Truman, a French Rafale became the first jet fighter of a foreign navy to have its engine replaced on board an American aircraft carrier.

In 2002, the Rafales were first deployed to a combat zone; seven Rafale Ms embarked aboard Charles de Gaulle of the French Navy during "Mission Héraclès", the French participation in "Operation Enduring Freedom". They flew from the aircraft carrier over Afghanistan, but the F1 standard precluded air-to-ground missions and the Rafale did not see any action. In March 2002, the aircraft carrier was stationed in the Gulf of Oman, where its complement of Rafales undertook training operations. In June 2002, while Charles de Gaulle was in the Arabian Sea, Rafales conducted several patrols near the India-Pakistan border.

In 2016, Rafales operating from Charles de Gaulle struck targets associated with the Islamic State of Iraq and the Levant (IS).

In December 2015, American and French military officials reportedly discussed the possibility of French naval Rafale Ms flying combat missions from a US Navy Nimitz-class aircraft carrier as soon as January 2017. This would enable continued French Navy operations against ISIL while Charles de Gaulle undergoes its year-and-a-half-long major refit, scheduled to begin in early 2017. Although Rafales have launched and landed on U.S. carriers to demonstrate interoperability, it would be the first time they would fly combat missions from one. As many as 18 Rafale Ms could be deployed on a carrier, although some room would have to be made for French Navy support crews familiar with maintaining the Rafale, as well as for spare parts and munitions. Operation Chesapeake, a test of this interoperability, was conducted in May 2018, when 12 Rafales of Flottilles 11F, 12F, and 17F, along with nearly 350 support personnel embarked aboard USS George H.W. Bush for two weeks of carrier qualifications and exercises after conducting a month of shore based training at Naval Air Station Oceana.

On 9 January 2025, Rafale M conducted joint anti-aircraft drills with Su-30MKI and Jaguar aircraft of the Indian Air Force. The French Carrier Strike Group (CSG) centered on the Charles de Gaulle, the carrier air wing including Rafale M, her escort ships and fleet support ship Jacques Chevallier were on a visit to India between 4 and 9 January 2025 during the Mission Clemenceau 25. Simultaneously, INS Mormugao conducted joint navigational drills and Maritime Partnership Exercise with the escort ships.

On June 8, 2026, a Rafale engaged a drone that had entered Latvian airspace.

==== French Air and Space Force ====
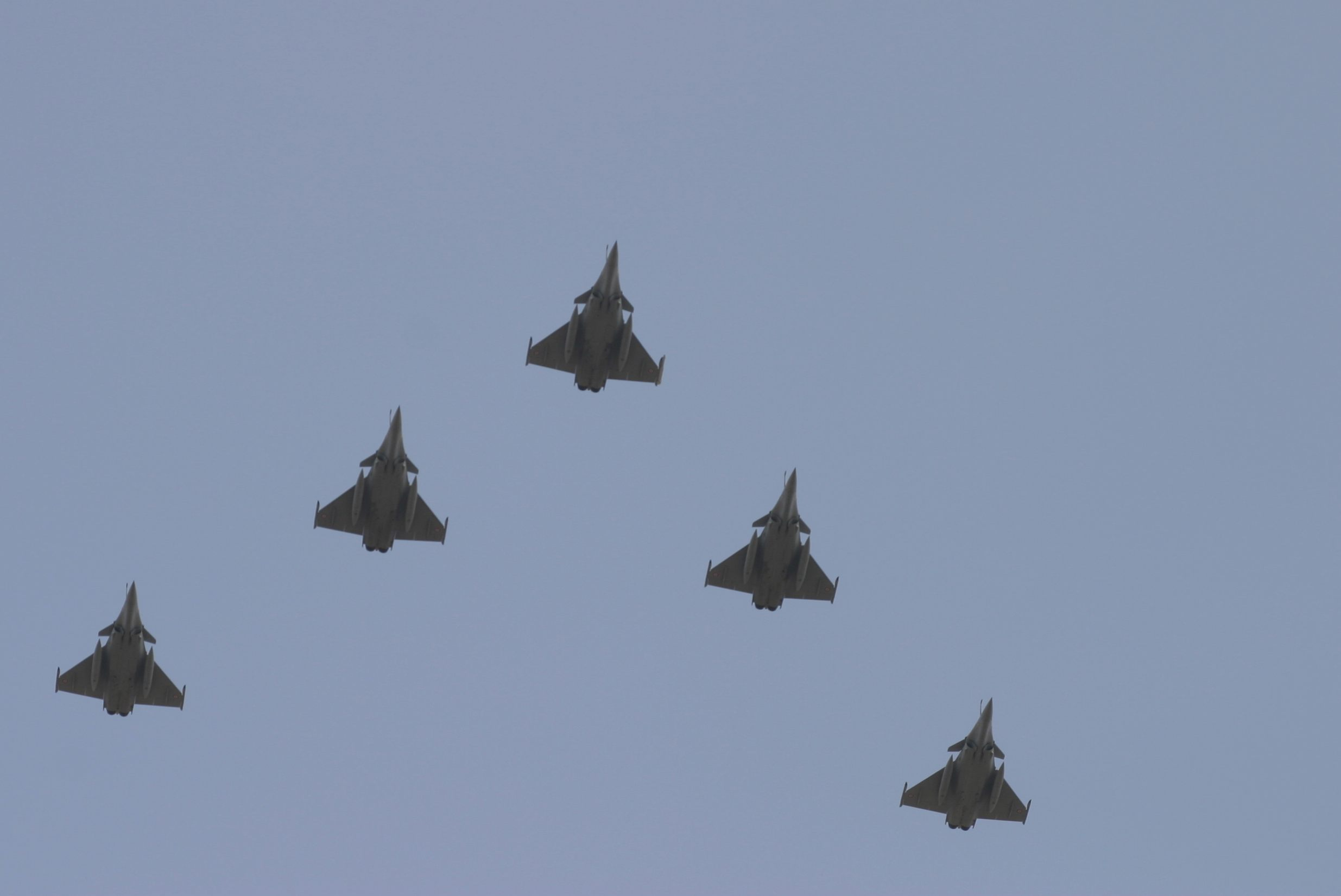
Formation of five Rafales making a flypast in 2006

In April 2005, the Air Force received its first three F2 standard Rafale Bs at the Centre d'expertise aérienne militaire (CEAM, i.e. the Military Air Expertise Centre) at Mont-de-Marsan, where they were tasked to undertake operational evaluation and pilot conversion training. By this time, it was expected that Escadron de Chasse (Fighter Squadron) 1/7 at Saint-Dizier would receive a nucleus of 8–10 Rafale F2s during the summer of 2006, in preparation for full operational service (with robust air-to-air and stand off air-to-ground precision attack capabilities) starting from mid-2007 (when EC 1/7 would have about 20 aircraft, 15 two-seaters and five single-seaters).

In 2007, a "crash program" upgrade on six Rafales enabled the use of laser-guided bombs in readiness for action in Afghanistan. Three of these aircraft of the Air Force were deployed to Dushanbe in Tajikistan, while the three others were Rafale Marine of the Navy on board Charles De Gaulle. The first mission occurred on 12 March 2007, and the first GBU-12 was launched on 28 March in support of embattled Dutch troops in Southern Afghanistan, marking the operational début of the Rafale. Between January 2009 and December 2011, a minimum of three Rafales were stationed at Kandahar International Airport to conduct operations in support of NATO ground forces.

On 19 March 2011, French Rafales began conducting reconnaissance and strike missions over Libya in Opération Harmattan, in support of United Nations Security Council Resolution 1973; initial targets were artillery pieces laying siege around the rebel city of Benghazi. The Rafale could operate in Libya without the support of SEAD aircraft, using the onboard SPECTRA self-defence system instead. On 24 March 2011, it was reported that a Rafale had destroyed a Libyan Air Force G-2/Galeb light attack/trainer aircraft on the runway. During the deployment, Rafale destroyed multiple SAM systems of Libyan military using its geolocation feature and with a mix of different ammunition. Unlike other allied aircraft, the Rafale did not require any dedicated EW/EA aircraft for escort.

Rafales typically conducted six-hour sorties over Libyan airspace, armed with four MICA air-to-air missiles, four or six AASM "Hammer" bombs, a Thales Damoclès targeting pod and two drop tanks. Each sortie needed multiple aerial refuelling operations from coalition tanker aircraft. The AASM precision-guidance weapon system allowed the Rafale to conduct high-altitude bombing missions using bombs weighing between 125 and 1,000 kg (280 and 2,200 lb). Reportedly, Rafale crews preferred to use GPS-guided munitions with greater reliability and range. SCALP weapons were deployed on only one or two sorties, such as against a Libyan airbase at Al-Jufra. In 2011, aviation journalist Craig Hoyle speculated that the Rafale's Libyan performance is likely to impact export sales, noting that the Rafale had maintained a high operational rate throughout. Hoyle also noted that the conflict had led to several urgent operational requirements, including a lighter ground-attack munition and AASM modifications for close air support.

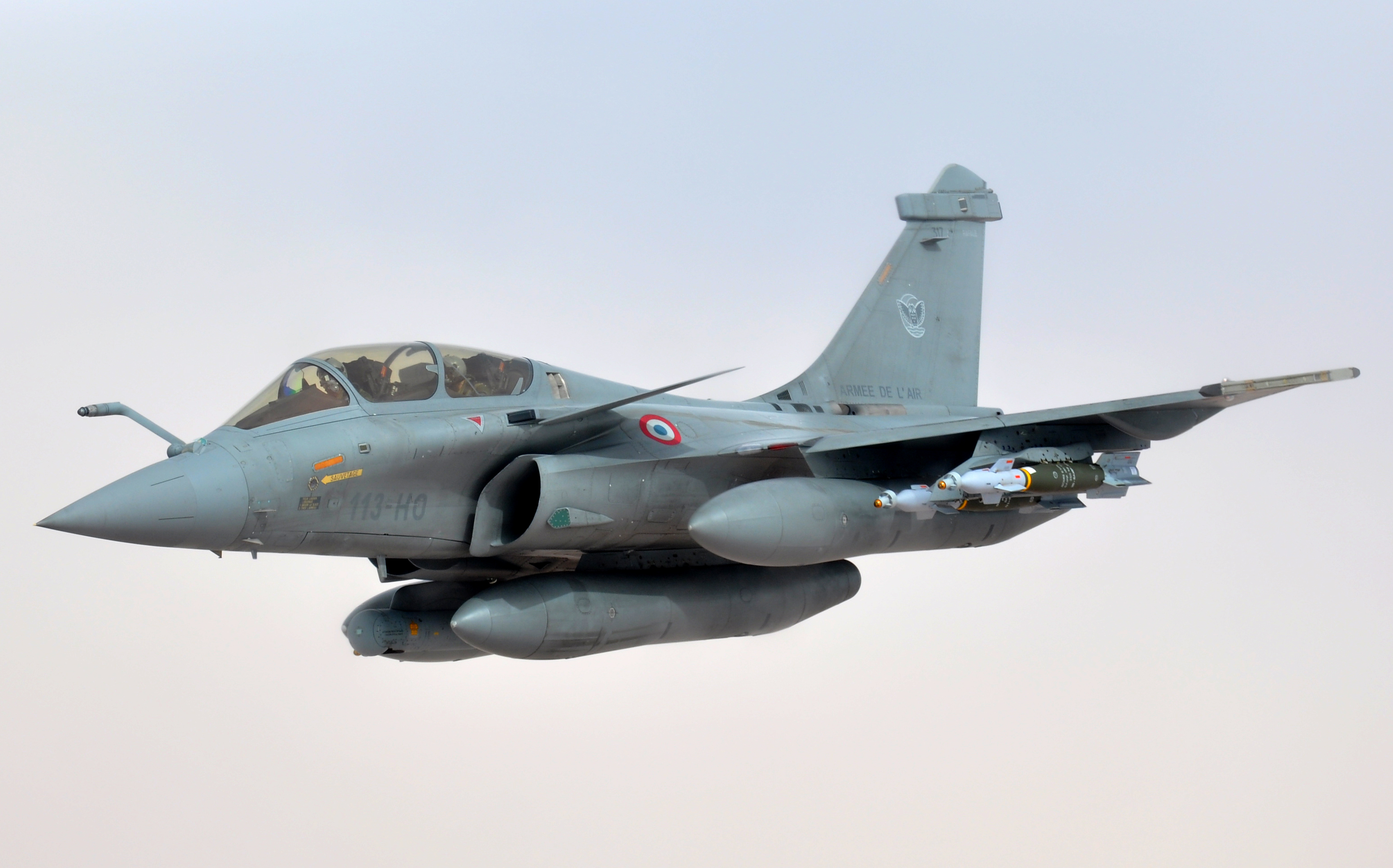
A French Air Force Rafale B during Operation Serval in Mali, 2013

In January 2013, the Rafale took part in Opération Serval, the French military intervention in support to the government of Mali against the Movement for Oneness and Jihad in West Africa. The first mission was carried out on 13 January, when four Rafales took off from an airbase in France to strike rebel training camps, depots and facilities in the city of Gao in eastern Mali. Subsequent airstrikes in the following days by Rafale and Mirage fighters were reportedly instrumental in the withdrawal of Islamist militant forces from Timbuktu and Douentza. Both Rafale and Mirage 2000D aircraft used in the conflict have been based outside of North Africa, making use of aerial refuelling tanker aircraft to fly long range sorties across Algerian airspace and into Mali.

In August 2013, it was proposed that France may halve the number of Rafales to be delivered over the next six years for a total of 26 aircraft to be delivered during this period; foreign export procurement have been viewed as critical to maintain production under this proposal. While production would be slowed, France would still receive the same number of Rafales overall.

In September 2014, Rafales started reconnaissance missions over Iraq for Opération Chammal, France's contribution to the international effort to combat IS militants. Six Rafales were initially tasked with identifying IS positions in support of US airstrikes, flying from Al Dhafra Air Base, UAE. On 18 September, Rafales joined American attack operations, launching four strikes near the Northern Iraqi town of Zummar that destroyed a logistics depot and killed dozens of IS fighters. In April 2018, during the Syrian Civil War, five Rafale Bs from the Escadron de Chasse 1/4 Gascogne participated in the 2018 missile strikes against Syria. Each was loaded with two SCALP EG missiles. French Air and Space Force Rafales were deployed to help blunt the Iranian attack against Israel on 13 April 2024 by shooting down an unspecified number of unmanned aerial vehicles. The Rafales, based in Jordan, were operating in Iraqi and Syrian airspace as part of Opération Chammal.

During the 2026 Iran war, a French base in the United Arab Emirates suffered a drone strike in the early days of the war when France was otherwise uninvolved, prompting the French Government to deploy Rafales and other assets to the Middle East as part of a package meant to defend French interests in the region. These planes have taken part in interceptions of Iranian Drones, with the first interceptions reported on the 4th of March and are primarily using MICA missiles. It was reported as of 20 March, that French Rafales brought down at least 60 Iranian drones over the UAE.

=== Egypt ===
In November 2014, Egypt was reportedly in negotiations with France to purchase 24 to 36 Rafales, subject to a financing and weapons package agreement. By February 2015, the two countries were negotiating a loan from France's export credit agency to reach an export agreement for up to 24 Rafales. The condition for Egypt to buy the 12 additional fighters was to get SCALP-EG missiles, this was compromised by the US blocking the deal. Egypt aimed for the deal's quick completion as to have them on display at the inauguration of the Suez Canal expansion in August 2015.

On 16 February 2015, Egypt became the Rafale's first international customer when it officially ordered 24 Rafales, as part of a larger deal, including a FREMM multipurpose frigate and missiles, worth US$5.9 billion (€5.2 billion). The order comprised 8 single-seat models and 16 two-seaters. In July 2015, a ceremony marking Egypt's acceptance of its first three Rafales, was held at Dassault's flight test center in Istres. In January 2016, Egypt received three more Rafales. All six aircraft are two-seat models (Rafale DM) diverted from French Air Force deliveries. Egypt received the third batch of three Rafales flown by Egyptian pilots from France in April 2017; this included the first single-seat model (Rafale EM) to be delivered to the Egyptian Air Force. Egypt took delivery of the fourth batch of two Rafale EMs in July 2017. The fifth batch, comprising the last 3 Rafale EMs, was delivered in November 2017, increasing the number in service to 14 Rafales.

In June 2016, Egypt begun negotiations with Dassault to acquire 12 additional Rafales, intending to exercise an option of the first contract. An Egyptian delegation visited France in November 2017 for negotiations. In May 2021, Egypt ordered 30 more Rafales in a contract worth $4.5bn after France achieved making the SCALP EG missile ITAR-free by replacing the US-made parts with French-made components. The Egyptian Air Force is interested in buying the Rafale F4 variant once Dassault prepares it for foreign buyers.

Analysts view the relatively quick series of 84 orders from Egypt and Qatar as being influenced by the Arab Spring and uncertainty of US involvement in the Middle East.

=== Qatar ===
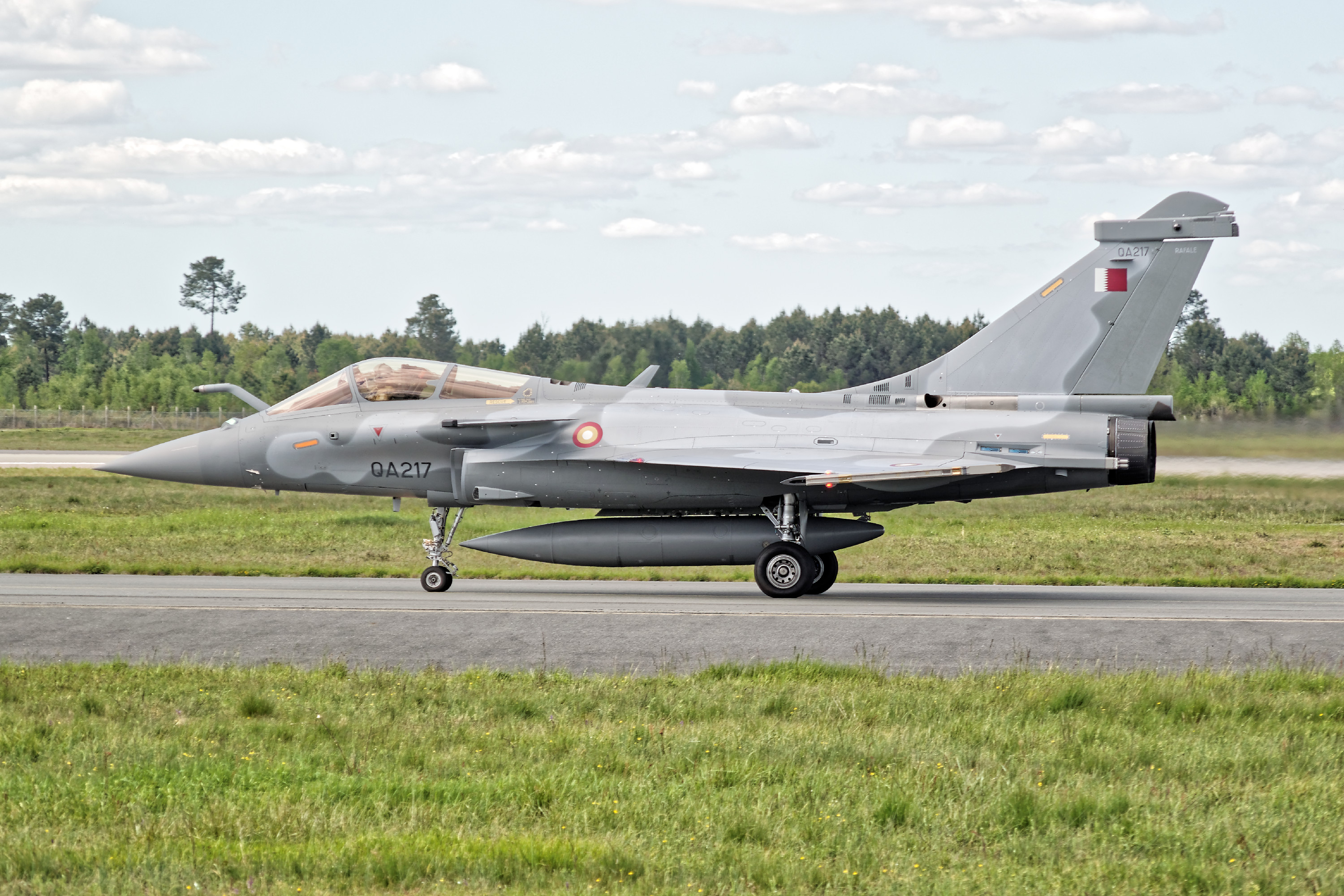
Qatari Rafale at Bordeaux–Mérignac Airport in 2019

The Qatar Emiri Air Force evaluated the Rafale alongside the Boeing F/A-18E/F Super Hornet, the Boeing F-15E, the Eurofighter Typhoon and the Lockheed Martin F-35 Lightning II to replace its Dassault Mirage 2000-5 fleet. In June 2014, Dassault claimed it was close to signing a contract with Qatar for 72 Rafales. On 30 April 2015, Sheikh Tamim bin Hamad Al Thani announced to French President François Hollande that Qatar would order 24 Rafale with an option to buy 12 more aircraft. On 4 May, a €6.3 billion ($7.02 billion) contract for 24 Rafales was finalised; additionally, the contract included the provision of long-range cruise missiles and Meteor missiles as well as the training of 36 Qatari pilots and 100 technicians by the French military and several Qatari intelligence officers; thus, the price can be viewed as €263M for each aircraft.

On 7 December 2017, the option for 12 more Rafales was exercised for €1.1 billion (or €92M each) while adding an additional option for 36 further fighters. The first Qatari Rafale was delivered in February 2019.

=== India ===
==== Indian Air Force ====
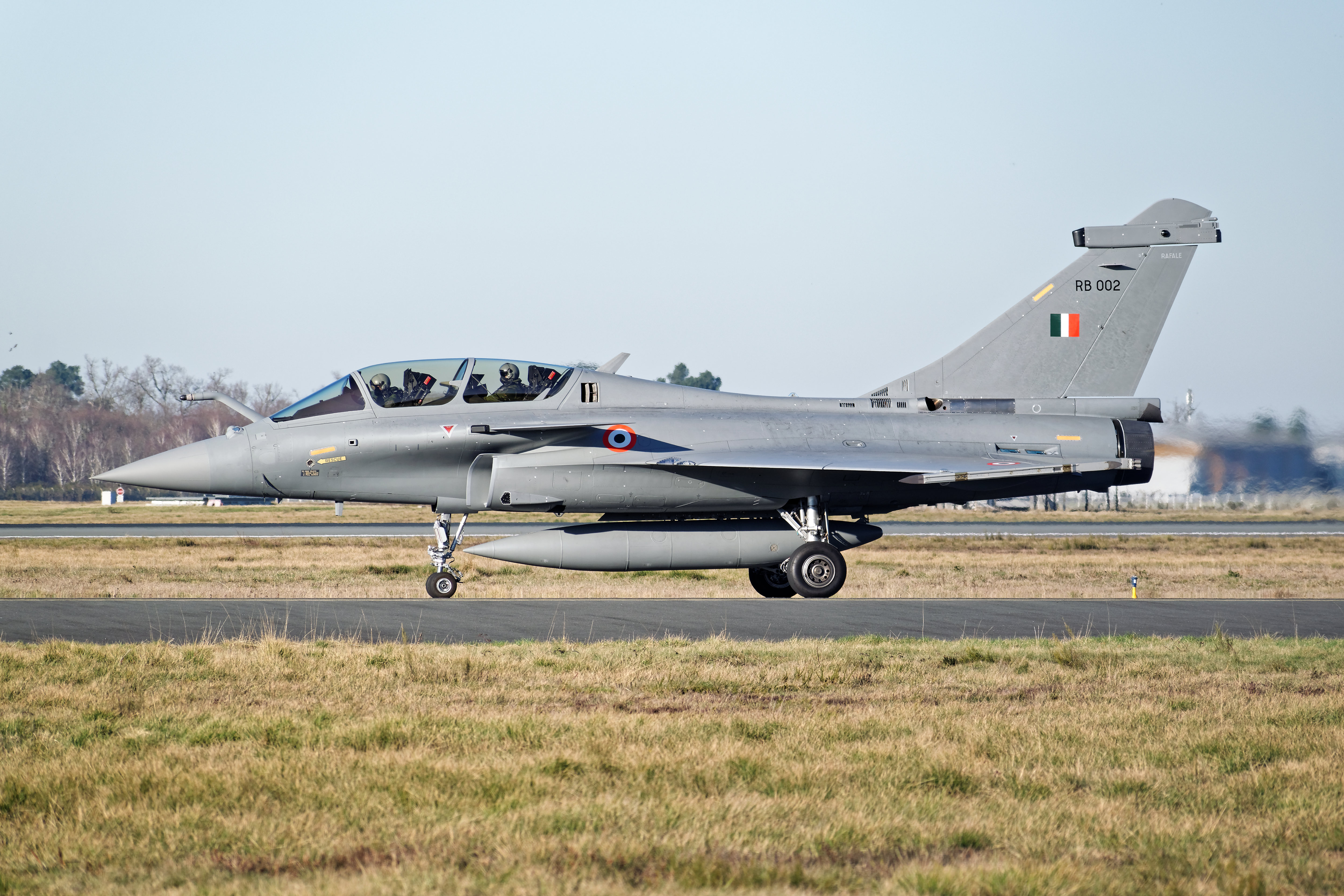
IAF Rafale at Bordeaux–Mérignac Airport, 6 February 2020

The Rafale was one of the six aircraft competing in the Indian MRCA competition for 126 multirole fighters. Originally, the Mirage 2000 had been considered for the competition, but Dassault withdrew it in favour of the Rafale. In February 2011, French Rafales flew demonstrations in India, including air-to-air combat against Su-30MKIs. In April 2011, the Indian Air Force (IAF) shortlisted the Rafale and Eurofighter Typhoon for the US$10.4 billion contract. On 31 January 2012, the IAF announced the Rafale as the preferred bidder. It was proposed that 18 Rafales would be supplied to the IAF by 2015 in fly-away condition, while the remaining 108 would be manufactured by Hindustan Aeronautics Limited (HAL) in India under transfer of technology agreements. The contract for 126 Rafales, services, and parts may have been worth up to US$20 billion.

The deal stalled due to disagreements over local production; Dassault refused responsibility for the 108 HAL-manufactured Rafales, holding reservations over HAL's ability to accommodate the complex manufacturing and technology transfers; instead, Dassault said it would have to negotiate two separate production contracts by both companies. The Indian Defence Ministry instead wanted Dassault to be solely responsible for the sale and delivery of all 126 aircraft. In May 2013, The Times of India reported that negotiations were "back on track", with plans for the first 18 Rafales to be delivered in 2017. In March 2014, the two sides reportedly agreed that the first 18 Rafales would be delivered to India in flying condition and that the remaining 108 would be 70 percent built by HAL. By December 2014, India and France reportedly expected to sign a contract by March 2015.

In April 2015, during Prime Minister Narendra Modi's visit to Paris, India requested the swift delivery of 36 Rafales in a fly-away condition. India withdrew the MMRCA tender on 30 July 2015. Then, India and France missed a July target to finalise the 36-aircraft deal. The previously agreed-upon terms in April totaled US$8 billion for 36 aircraft costing $200 million each, with an offset requirement of 30 percent of the deal's value to be reinvested in India's defence sector and infrastructure for Rafale operations. India insisted on a 50 percent offset and two bases, which France said would increase costs and require separate infrastructure and two sets of maintenance, training and armament storage facilities. On 23 September 2016, Defence Minister Manohar Parrikar and his French counterpart Jean-Yves Le Drian signed a €7.8 billion contract for 36 fly-away Rafales with an option for 18 more. Initial deliveries were expected by 2019, and all 36 within six years. The deal included spares and weapons such as Meteor missiles. Around August 2017, India considered ordering 36 more Rafales amid tensions with China.

The Indian National Congress raised an issue over Dassault partnering with Anil Ambani's Reliance Defence and Engineering, a private company with no aviation experience, instead of the state owned HAL. Allegedly, Dassault lacked any choice and was compelled to select Reliance Defence as its partner. Rahul Gandhi alleged that it was favouritism and corruption. Both the French government and Dassault issued a press release stating it was Dassault's decision to choose Reliance Defence. Party spokesperson Manish Tewari asked for the agreement's details to be made public and questioned if there was an escalation of per-aircraft cost from ₹7.15 billion to ₹16 billion. In November 2018, Congress alleged that procurement procedures were bypassed. A Public Interest Litigation (PIL) case was filed in the Supreme Court for an independent probe into the Rafale procurement. On 14 December 2018, the Apex Court dismissed all petitions, stating it found no irregularities; Reliance Defence reportedly was set to receive just over 3 per cent of the ₹300 billion (equivalent to ₹440 billion or US$4.7 billion in 2026) of offsets, contrary to the impression that it was to be the biggest beneficiary of the deal.

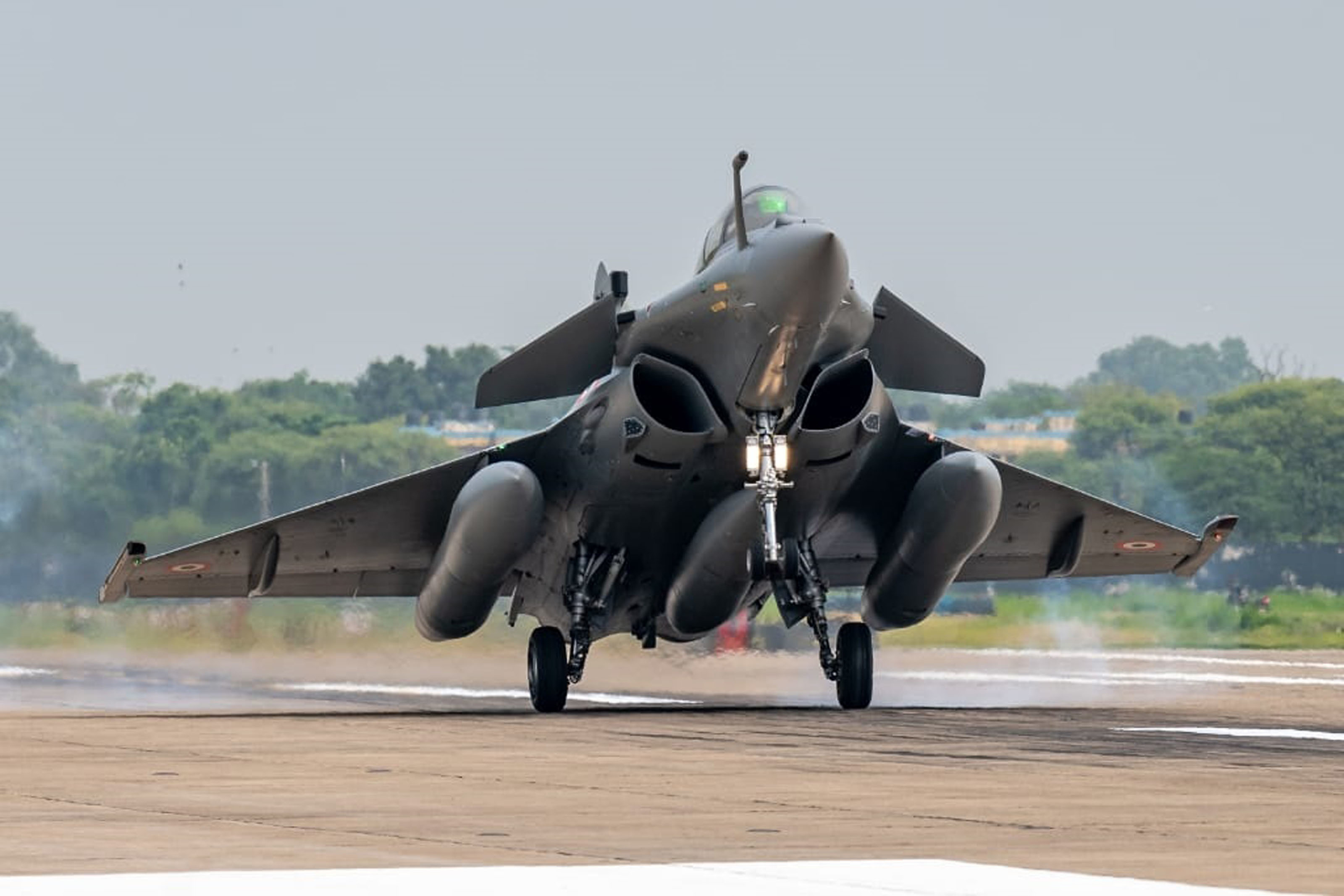
A Rafale landing at Ambala Air Force Station on its first arrival in India on 29 July 2020.

Ahead of the first Rafale's formal handover on 8 October 2019 (IAF Day), the IAF accepted it at Dassault's Bordeaux facility in an event attended by Defence Minister Rajnath Singh and his French counterpart, Florence Parly; it had tail number "RB-001" in reference to IAF chief-designate Air Chief Marshal R. K. S. Bhadauria. The first five Rafales were delivered on 27 July 2020. The last Rafale arrived in April 2022.

In June 2024, an IAF contingent attended the second edition Red Flag – Alaska 2024 exercise which was conducted from 4 June to 14 June in Eielson Air Force Base, Alaska. This contingent consisted of Rafales, one Il-78MKI mid-air refueller and a C-17 heavy transport aircraft. The exercise focused on Beyond Visual Range combat simulations. Other participants in the exercise included Republic of Singapore Air Force, Royal Air Force, Royal Netherlands Air Force, Luftwaffe, and the US Air Force. The aggressor unit was 18th Fighter Interceptor Squadron. After the conclusion of the exercise, on the way back to India, the contingent made a refuelling stop at Lajes Field, Portugal. After the stop, the contingent was split into two components, with one visiting Greece and the other visiting Egypt. The Rafales also participated in air combat exercises with Hellenic Air Force's F-16 and Egyptian Air Force's Rafales.

During 2024, IAF Rafales at Hasimara AFS under the aegis of Eastern Air Command had reportedly been trained to shoot air-to-air missiles at targets mimicking Chinese spy balloons at relatively high altitude of 55,000 ft (17,000 m); this occurred after the 2023 Chinese balloon incident.

The IAF's Rafale fleet will receive upgrades through the Indian Navy's Rafale Marine deal. For this, 10 of the 36 IAF Rafales will be upgraded to allow buddy-buddy refuelling enhancing their operational range. Other improvements include ground-based support equipment, software upgrades, advanced weapon systems and sensor suites as well as 40 long-range drop tanks.

===== 2025 India–Pakistan conflict =====
On the intervening night of 6–7 May 2025, the IAF reportedly deployed Rafales armed with SCALP missiles and AASM Hammer glide bombs during Operation Sindoor to strike nine targets within Pakistan, which India alleged to be terrorist camps. According to Pakistani authorities, five Indian aircraft were shot down during the operation, including three Rafales. Concurrently, CNN reported the loss of one Rafale cited with claims of an unnamed high ranking French intelligence official, while Reuters separately reported that Pakistani J-10 fighters were believed to have shot down at least two Indian aircraft, including a Rafale, citing claims from two unnamed U.S. officials. Pakistan itself implied using J-10C fighters in the combat, as well as the use of PL-15 long-range air-to-air missiles. The Washington Post reported that the debris consistently matched with at least two French-made IAF aircraft — one of them being a Rafale. One verified image showed the wreckage of the vertical stabilizer of a Rafale; the National Interest said that, based on this evidence, at least one Rafale was indeed lost. Additionally, BBC Verify reported that a Rafale had crashed in Indian territory. The unit authenticated three videos showing the wreckage of a Rafale in a field near Bathinda, Punjab. One video, geo-located by BBC Verify, showed Indian troops collecting debris from the crash site during daylight. Two additional clips from the same location, filmed at night, showed debris in a field and a projectile catching fire in the sky before igniting on the ground.

According to French deputy Marc Chavent, several sources - including American analysts and NATO intelligence data - credited the J-10C with destroying a Rafale. On 9 May, the Pakistan Air Force reiterated its earlier downing claims of five Indian fighters, including Rafales, backed by crash locations, how the interception of combat formations was conducted, Cockpit Voice Recorder (CVR) transcript of the formation leader purportedly expressing concern over losing contact with a fellow pilot, and flight data.

On 31 May 2025, India's Chief of Defence Staff General Anil Chauhan admitted that India had lost jets, but dismissed Pakistan's claim to have shot down six fighters. According to Chauhan, these losses led to corrections in India's tactics in the following strikes of 7, 8 and 10 May.

Following India's airstrikes against Pakistan, anonymous French officials cited by the Associated Press alleged that China had engaged in a coordinated effort to undermine international sales of Rafales. French military officials said that they had not found sufficient evidence to directly link online posts criticizing the performance of Rafales to the Chinese government; however, French intelligence services reported that Chinese embassy defence attachés conveyed the same narratives during meetings with security officials from other countries, including claims that IAF Rafales had not performed well and promoted Chinese-made weaponry. Commenting on the incident to Associated Press, China's Ministry of National Defence dismissed the claims, stating that China maintains a prudent and responsible approach to military exports. The US–China Economic and Security Review Commission also alleged a disinformation campaign by China, stating that fake social media accounts were used to propagate AI and video game images of supposed 'debris' from Indian aircraft. According to French Air Force Chief General Jérôme Bellanger, he had seen evidence that confirms the loss of a Rafale during the conflict.

On 15 June, Indian media outlets, including India Today and The Print, reported that Dassault CEO Éric Trappier had publicly disputed Pakistan's previous claim that its air force had shot down IAF Rafales during Operation Sindoor, calling the assertion "inaccurate". However Dassault denied these reports and issued a statement: "In response to certain press reports quoting Dassault Aviation Chairman & CEO, Eric Trappier, about the Sindoor operation, Dassault Aviation formally denies that Eric Trappier has made any operational or technical comments regarding the use of the Rafale in this operation." On 7 July, Indian Defence Secretary RK Singh while speaking to CNBC TV18 dismissed claims that IAF Rafales had been shot down by Pakistan during Operation Sindoor and emphasised that the Indian armed forces had complete operational autonomy during the conflict.

In January 2026, The Times of India reported that during the 26 January 2026 Republic Day parade, the IAF flew BS022 - the same Rafale that Pakistan had claimed to have destroyed. Previously, aerospace journalist Alan Warnes and retired Lt Gen Kidwai had claimed that Rafales with identification codes - BS001, BS021, BS022, and BS027 as being allegedly destroyed, however India has not confirmed losses. In June 2026, the IAF issued a tender to seek "bridge support" for all 36 of its initial batch of Rafales; a The Times of India article interpreted the tender as contradicting the claim that any Rafales were lost in the conflict.

===== Additional IAF procurement =====
The government-to-government (G2G) deal for 114 Rafale aircraft under the Multi-Role Fighter Aircraft (MRFA) programme was first reported in April 2025. By August, IAF was actively pursuing for the deal to meet its urgent requirements amid its depleting fighter strength and was expected to submit a document to the Ministry of Defence for the procurement programme soon for an approval. Rafale's existing infrastructure at air bases where the jet is deployed — Hasimara and Ambala — can host at least one more squadron of the jet each. The proposal document, officially the Statement of Case (SoC), was received by the Ministry of Defence in early September and was being considered by the Finance Division, chaired by Secretary (Defence Finance). By 17 September, the deal had been moved to fast track procurement mode and was expected to be signed in the next year.

On 16 January 2026, the Defence Procurement Board chaired by the Defence Secretary, Rajesh Kumar Singh, cleared the acquisition proposal worth ₹3.25 lakh crore (€31 billion). The deal includes 88 single-seat variants and 26 twin-seat trainer variants. The in-service 36 IAF Rafales might also be upgraded to the F4 standard under the agreement.

The deal was granted the Acceptance of Necessity (AoN) during a Defence Acquisition Council (DAC) meeting chaired by the Defence Minister, Rajnath Singh, on 12 February 2026. According to the proposal document cleared by DAC, 18 fighters are to be delivered in fly away condition from France; the remaining 96 are to be manufactured in India with an indigenous content of over 25%. The fly away jets are not expected to arrive before 2032 as per an India Today article on 18 February while the Indian assembled jets are also expected to arrive by the same time. Though Dassault will reportedly integrate Astra Mark 1 and the Smart Anti-Airfield Weapon on Rafale, the IAF will still need to depend on the firm to integrate further weapons since the source code is not acquired. In March 2026, Dassault CEO Éric Trappier explained that the firm will establish a second Rafale assembly line at Hyderabad, if the order is placed, with a target production rate yet to be decided. On the other hand, the indigenisation of these fighters is expected to be 50% by component numbers.

In April 2026, it was reported that the request for proposal (RfP) will be issued to Dassault aviation by May. This will be followed by contract negotiations during which the government will ensure that indigenous weapons remain compatible with the aircraft. The transfer of the interface control document (ICD) will be insisted on by the Indian site during the negotiations. The plan is to “hardwire” ICD into the final contract.

The Acquisition Wing of the Indian MoD issued the Letter of Request (LoR) in the last week of May. This marked the formal commencement of the acquisition project. The LoR is a formal government-to-government communication used to initiate defence procurement under the Intergovernmental Agreement (IGA) framework. The response to the LoR, the detailed technical and commercial proposal, was submitted by France on 29 July. The proposal is being examined by the Acquisition Wing and the Indian Air Force. The proposal also includes a detailed partnership roadmap for the project — Dassault has proposed a joint final assembly line with Tata Advanced Systems; a partnership between Thales and Mahindra Group to collaborate on radar and avionics; MBDA is likely to partner with Larsen & Toubro for armaments; and Safran will partner with Hindustan Aeronautics Limited for the aero engine segment. The major requirement were met by the proposal which is still under detailed evaluation. If there is no major clarification required, the procedure will directly skip to cost and contract negotiations. Since the France's proposed pricing falls within the DAC cleared budget of ₹3.25 lakh crore, officials aims to conclude the contract within this financial year.

==== Indian Navy ====
In June 2012, Flight Global reported that the Indian Navy was considering the purchase of Rafale Ms for INS Vikrant. Subsequently, Rafale also won the IAF's MMRCA competition. In January 2016, the Indian government directed the Indian Navy to be briefed by Dassault on the Rafale M for its aircraft carriers, promoting logistics and spares commonalities between the Navy and IAF. In December 2016, the Indian Navy rejected the naval variant of the HAL Tejas due to it lacking enough thrust-to-weight ratio with full fuel and weapons load being overweight making it incapable of operating optimally from aircraft carriers. Hence, the Navy was expecting to import fighters from abroad to fulfil its requirements within six years. By this point, it had inducted 30 of the 45 MiG-29K that had been ordered while the expected procurement of 50 Tejas Naval aircraft stood cancelled.

On 17 January 2017, the Indian Navy released a Request for Information to procure 57 fighters under the Multi-Role Carrier Borne Fighter (MRCBF) programme to form the fighter wing of INS Vikrant. The requirements included day-night and all-weather operation capability, shipborne air defence, air-to-surface, buddy-buddy aerial refuelling, reconnaissance, electronic warfare among others. Deliveries would span between three and six months of the contract's signing. By June 2017, Dassault with their Rafale M, Boeing with F/A-18E/F, Saab with the Gripen Maritime and UAC with MiG-29K had formally responded to the RFI. Talks with Dassault and Boeing began by 2018 while the Request for Proposal was expected that same year under a strategic partnership (SP) model. The Navy was finalising its specific Naval Air Staff Requirements (NASR).

By December 2020, the number of fighters for the MRCBF was reduced to 36 amid a proposal by India's DRDO and ADA to develop the HAL TEDBF indigenously. There were also plans to merge the MRCBF procurement with the IAF's MRFA. That same month, Boeing Defense, Space & Security, in coordination with the United States Navy, demonstrated the F/A-18's capability to operate from a STOBAR carrier at Naval Air Station Patuxent River by conducting eight ski-jumps.

On 6 January 2022, a 12-day demonstration of the Rafale M took place at the 283 metre-long shore-based test facility (SBTF) at INS Hansa, Goa. The deal would be in the Government-to-Government (G2G) mode instead of buying directly from the manufacturers. The quantity was further reduced to 26. Between 20 May and 15 June 2022, two F/A-18E/F Block III completed "operational demonstration tests" in the same facility. Trials included multiple ski-jumps, roll-ins, fly-in-arrestments in various configurations including air-to-air, air-to-ground, and air-to-surface making the jet "compliant" with Indian Navy aircraft carriers. By 7 December 2022, the Indian Navy headquarters submitted a report to the ministry of defence in which the Rafale was allegedly the front runner after having met all criteria. The Navy HQ had performed detailed analysis of the trial report prepared by the officials who had undertaken the previous trials.

On 13 July 2023, Defence Acquisition Council (DAC) of India granted the Acceptance of Necessity (AoN) for the procurement of 26 Rafale M F4 for the Indian Navy along with three additional Kalvari-class submarines. Senior representatives from the Navy, Defense Acquisition Wing, along with Dassault and Thales, commenced negotiations on 30 May 2024. By late June 2024, the base price of Rafale was decided to be same as that of the IAF. On 3 September 2024, the Defence Acquisition Council dropped the integration of Uttam AESA radar and other indigenous weapons like Astra missiles on the Rafale M due to high costs and an estimated delay of 8 years for design changes. By 29 September 2024, Dassault submitted its final price offer for the 26 aircraft to the Navy. The squadron will be based at INS Dega, Visakhapatnam and will form the Carrier Air Group of Vikrant.

The deal, worth ₹63,887 crore (equivalent to ₹680 billion or €6.5 billion in 2026), included purchase of weapon systems like Meteor (air-to-air), Exocet (anti-ship) and SCALP (cruise missile) along with five-year performance-based logistics support and training programmes for crew training to operate and maintain the jets, associated ancillary equipment, simulator, spares and Indian Navy-specific design alterations. INS Vikrant will also be equipped for Rafale-M operations as part of the deal. Design alterations for Indian Navy jets over those of IAF include helmet mounted display, low band frequency jammers, improved radio altimeter and very high frequency range decoys as well as software changes for air to sea mode, electromagnetic interference (EMI) and electromagnetic compatibility (EMC) among others. By 3 February 2025, the price negotiations were completed.

The Cabinet Committee on Security cleared the deal on 9 April 2025. The IN-specific Rafale Ms will be showcased by Dassault within 18 months and all aircraft will be delivered within 37 to 65 months after the contract's signing. The deal was signed on 28 April 2025, and comprised 22 single-seat carrier-compatible aircraft and four twin-seat aircraft that will be solely used from land bases. The first four Rafale-Ms will be delivered by 2029. The programme was officially launched on 19 June as an Indian defence delegation, led by Joint Secretary and Acquisition Manager (Maritime Systems) Dinesh Kumar, met with French defence officials, led by Lt Gen Gael Diaz De Tuesta, Director General of Armament, during the Paris Air Show. The first Rafale Marine will be delivered in 2028. The contract also mandates technology transfer for integration of Indian weapons onboard; production of Rafale fuselage in India as well as an MRO facility for M88 engines in India.

On 15 February 2026, a La Tribune report indicated that an additional order for 31 Rafale Marines is being considered by the Indian Navy. The first aircraft delivery is expected in August–September of 2026 as of 23 March that year. French Rafales began testing at the SBTF of INS Hansa in October with focus on the modifications required for operations onboard INS Vikrant. On 29 October, following conclusion of trials, a Rafale M test aircraft conducted take-off and landing manoeuvres on Vikrant. The trials form part of the procurement contract and aims to validate the aircraft's India-specific modifications to integrate them with the aircraft carrier, especially the ones for STOBAR operations, and induct them into Indian Navy service. The Rafale belongs to the Marine Nationale fleet which operates from French aircraft carrier Charles de Gaulle. The modifications include a detachable missile rail on the wingtip of Rafale as a measure to accommodate the aircraft on the carrier and its elevators. Certain modifications are also being carried out on the elevators along with installation of specialised systems on Vikrant to integrate the aircraft. Similar changes will be necessary on INS Vikramaditya as well, where the centre lift is only 9.9 metres wide. A triangle landing aid similar to the one found on Charles de Gaulle was also seen onboard Vikrant during the landing.

=== Greece ===
In August 2020, the government of Greece announced the acquisition of 18 Rafales. Initial reports stated that ten would be the new Rafale C variant in F3-R standard with eight older Rafale in F1 and F2 standard in use with the French Air and Space Force that would be given to Greece.

In January 2021, the Hellenic Parliament ratified the agreement with Dassault for the purchase of six new built and 12 used F3-R aircraft formerly used by the Armée de l'Air at a total cost of €2.4 billion, including armaments and ground support. The inter-governmental agreement was signed on 25 January 2021 by the Defense Ministers of Greece and France. This was followed by an additional contract in March 2022 to buy the six additional Rafales, to be delivered from mid-2024. The first aircraft, a Rafale B two-seater, was delivered on 21 July 2021. On 19 January 2022, the first six Rafales landed at Tanagra Air Base where a welcoming ceremony was held. The type officially entered service in September 2023. In 2024, it was reported that the Greek government was looking to buy 6 to 12 more Rafales (as well as another Frigate) on the 80th Anniversary of D-Day. They also wanted to negotiate postponing some payments on previous arms deals to 2028–2030, and negotiate the transfer of 24 Mirage 2000-R that they wanted to discard as partial payment. In April 2026, President Macron offered Greece to transfer all of its aging Mirage 2000-5 aircraft to Ukraine and in return, get a discount on an equivalent number of new Rafales.

=== Croatia ===
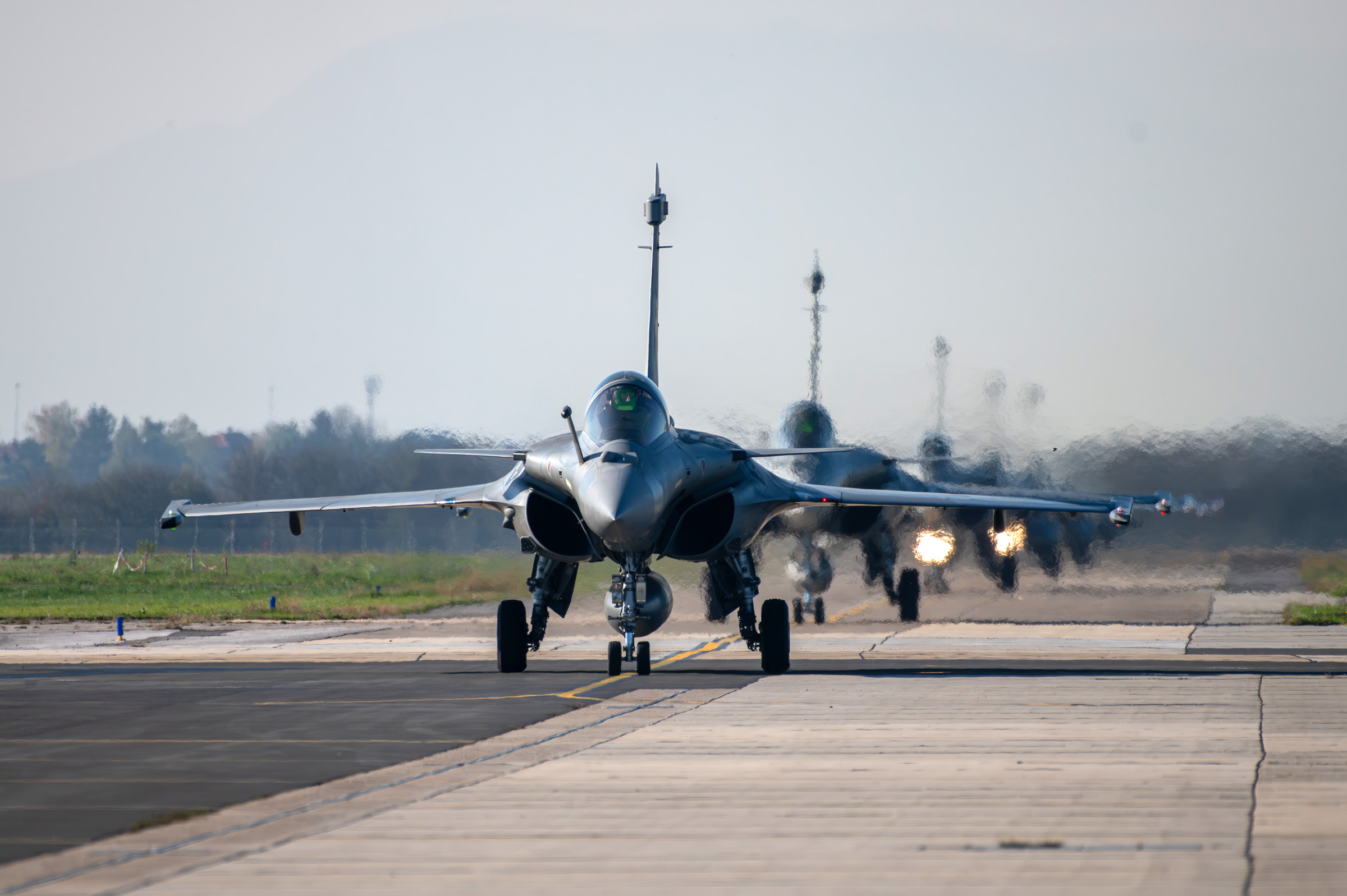
Croatian Rafale F3-R in Zagreb Airport

The Republic of Croatia received a proposal for twelve second-hand Rafales F3Rs in September 2020 in a tender to replace the Croatian Air Force's MiG-21s. The total package offered costs €1 billion (including weapon systems, spare parts, logistics and training), and competed with new F-16V Block 70, Israeli used F-16C/D Barak raised to ACE configuration, and Saab Gripen. On 28 May 2021, Croatian Prime Minister Andrej Plenković announced the purchase of twelve used Rafales F3-R C/B on order, ten single-seater C F3-R and two two-seater Rafale B F3Rs. The contract was signed on 25 November 2021.

On 2 October 2023, Croatia received the first of twelve Rafales during a ceremony at Mont-de-Marsan Air Base. The 12th and final aircraft was delivered on 25 April 2025.

On 8 December 2025 in France, Croatian Defence Minister, and the French Minister for Armed Forces signed a contract Letter of Intent for further upgrading 12 Rafale aircraft from the Rafale F3-R standard to enhanced capabilities of the Rafale F4 standard.

=== United Arab Emirates ===
In 2009, the United Arab Emirates Air Force was interested in an upgraded Rafale with more powerful engines and radar, and advanced air-to-air missiles. In October 2011, Dassault was confident that a US$10 billion deal for up to 60 Rafales would be signed. However, Deputy Supreme Commander of the Union Defence Force, Mohammed bin Zayed Al Nahyan, in November 2011 called the French offer "uncompetitive and unworkable"; In 2010, France allegedly asked the UAE to pay US$2.6 billion of the total cost of Rafale upgrades. Consequently, the UAE explored a purchase of the Eurofighter Typhoon or the F/A-18E/F Super Hornet. The newspaper La Tribune reported in February 2012, that the UAE was still considering the US$10-billion deal for 60 Rafales. Interoperability among the Gulf air forces had renewed Qatari and Kuwaiti interest in the Rafale. In January 2013, President Hollande stated that he would discuss the Rafale during an official visit to the UAE. In December 2013, the UAE reportedly chose not to proceed with a deal for defence and security services, including the supply of Typhoons.

In September 2014, it was reported that the UAE could acquire 40 Rafales in addition to upgrading its existing Mirage 2000s. In November 2015, Reuters reported that Major General Ibrahim Nasser Al Alawi, commander of the UAE Air Force and Air Defence, had confirmed that the UAE was in final negotiations to purchase 60 Rafales. In 2019 a series of Rafale F3-R trials were conducted at Al Dhafra Air Base in the UAE. On 3 December 2021, Dassault announced that the UAE had signed an order for 80 Rafale F4 in a government-to-government deal, which made the UAE the largest Rafale operator in the region and second to France. The deal makes the United Arab Emirates Air Force the first user of the Rafale F4 standard outside France.

On 29 January 2025, UAE received its first Rafale at a ceremony in Paris. The first aircraft would be used for testing and training in France, while deliveries for the rest of the fleet to commence in 2027.

On 4 April 2026, the UAE reportedly withdrew from an agreement to contribute approximately €3.5 billion towards the development of the Rafale F5 standard, following disagreements over France's refusal to grant Emirati companies access to sensitive technologies. The withdrawal did not affect the UAE's existing order for 80 Rafales, but left France facing the prospect of financing the F5 development programme independently. However, on 20 October 2026, France and the UAE signed an intergovernmental agreement to renew cooperation on the Rafale F5 programme, outlining a common strategy for its development and addressing technical and financial aspects of defence-industrial cooperation. The agreement's financial terms and the extent of Emirati access to sensitive technologies were not disclosed.

=== Indonesia ===
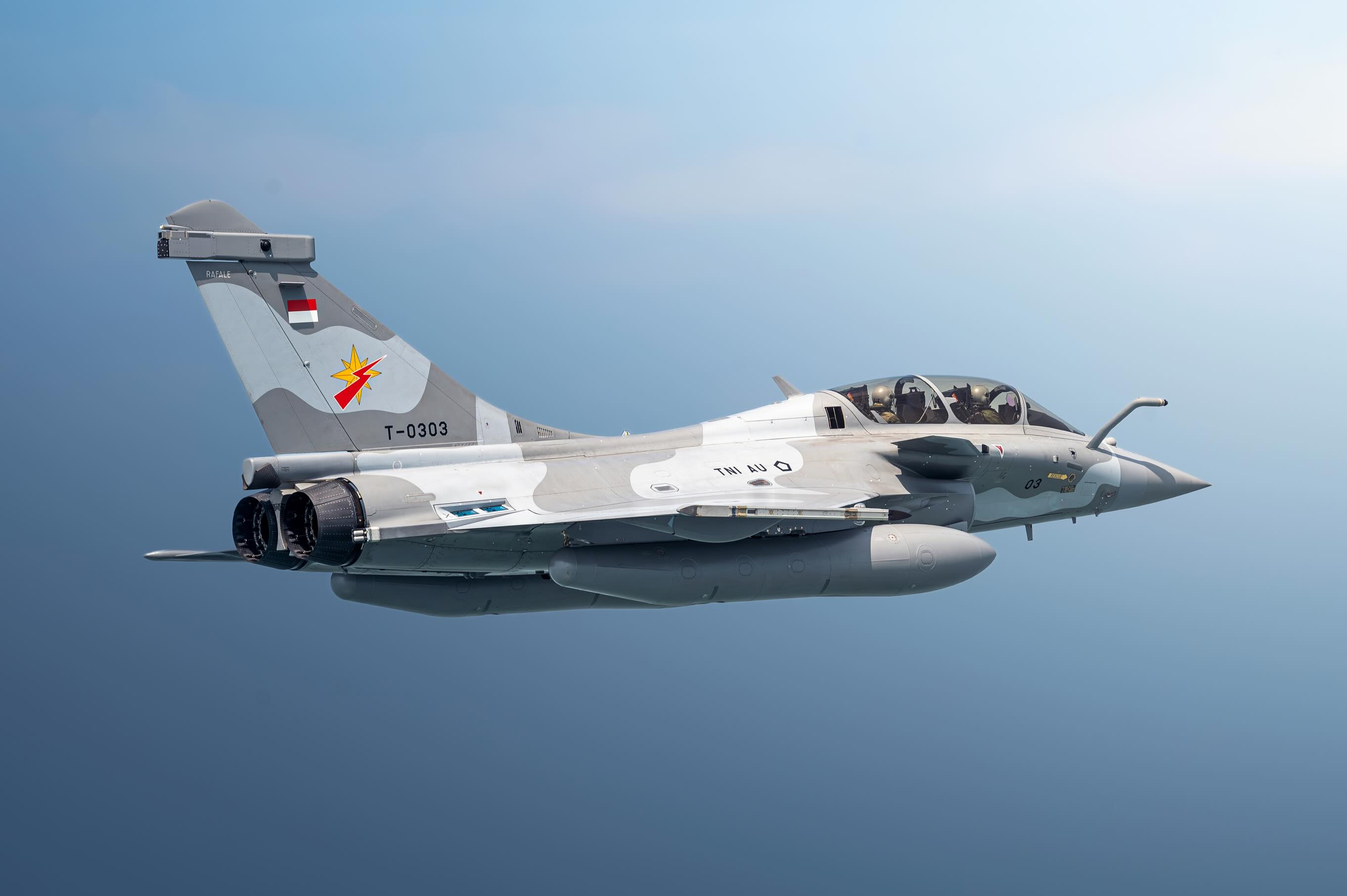
An Indonesian Rafale DI F4.1 in-flight, May 2026

In January 2020, the Indonesian government expressed interest in buying up to 48 Rafales to modernise the Indonesian Air Force. In February 2021, Indonesia's Minister of Defense Prabowo Subianto announced that the purchase of 36 units, as part of a large procurement programme including A330 tankers and complementary American products, was planned and that funds had been secured for its finalization. On 7 June 2021, Indonesia signed a letter of intent to buy 36 Rafales and associated weapons and support.

On 20 January 2022, Prabowo Subianto confirmed that Indonesia had completed the negotiation of the contract pending activation of the formal agreement by France. On 10 February 2022, Dassault stated that Indonesia had officially signed an order for 42 Rafale F4 consisting of 26 single-seat and 16 double-seat. The first tranche for six Rafales came into force in September 2022. On 10 August 2023, Dassault announced that a contract covering a second tranche of 18 Rafales for Indonesia had come into force that day, bringing the total under contract to 24. On 8 January 2024, Dassault Aviation disclosed that the third, and final tranche of 18 Rafales came into force, bringing the total aircraft ordered to 42.

During the French President Emmanuel Macron's visit to Indonesia on 28 May 2025, both countries signed a Letter of Intent to purchase various military hardware, including an undisclosed number of additional Rafales. La Tribune reported that Indonesia would order "a dozen" additional Rafales. The French media further reported on 4 July that Indonesia may order up to 24 additional Rafales.

The Indonesian Air Force sent four combat pilots and twelve technicians to France in early August 2025 to attend a training program for the Rafales.

Indonesia formally received its first batch of three Rafales on 28 November 2025 in a ceremony at a Dassault facility in Bordeaux. The first Rafales will be based at Roesmin Nurjadin Air Force Base in Pekanbaru, Riau. The Rafales arrived in Pekanbaru on 23 January 2026. Another three was delivered in May 2026. The initial six Rafales were formally accepted into service on 18 May.

=== Future operators ===
==== Serbia ====
President of Serbia, Aleksandar Vučić, stated on 24 December 2021 that Serbia is interested in buying new Rafales to strengthen the Serbian Air Force and Air Defence. On 8 April 2024, President Vučić announced the country's intention to purchase 12 Rafales, stating that "concrete agreements regarding the purchase of Rafale jets" had been made with French President Emmanuel Macron. Contract negotiations were completed in August 2024. The contract for nine single-seater and three two-seater Rafales F3s is worth €2.7 billion (US$3 billion).

=== Potential operators ===
==== Brazil ====
On 30 October 2024, the Brazilian media reported that France's President Emmanuel Macron during his trip to Rio de Janeiro to participate the 2024 G20 summit will offer to the Brazilian President Luiz Inácio Lula da Silva a package of armaments, including 24 Rafales to replace the older AMX as the Brazilian Air Force is in a selection process of a replacement for their preferred attack jet.

==== Iraq ====
In November 2020, Iraqi Defence Minister Jumaa Anad stated that Iraq plans to buy Rafales for the Iraqi Air Force. In February 2022, Iraq reportedly intends to acquire 14 Rafale F4s, payable in crude oil. However, as of October 2024, it was still weighing its options with reports that France will not be selling the Meteor AAM to Iraq if an order was placed. Iraq and France are in negotiations as of 2026.

==== Malaysia ====
The Rafale was a contender for the replacement of the Royal Malaysian Air Force's (RMAF) Mikoyan MiG-29s, with a requirement to equip three squadrons with 36 to 40 fighters with an estimated budget of RM6 billion to RM8 billion (US$1.84 billion to US$2.46 billion). Other competitors were the Eurofighter Typhoon, Boeing F/A-18/F Super Hornet and Saab JAS 39 Gripen. In July 2017, acquisition efforts were suspended with the RMAF looking instead to buy new maritime patrol aircraft and advanced trainers with light attack capabilities to confront the growing threat of Islamist militants in the Southeast Asian region.

==== Peru ====
In July 2024, it was reported that Peru as part of a revitalization program for the combat sections of the Peruvian Air Force (FAP) was considering the Rafale as one of the contenders for a recently launched contract for fighters. General Carlos Enrique Chávez Cateriano, the commanding general of the FAP, announced on 8 July 2024 that a competition had been launched and the Rafale was one of two leading contenders, with the other leading contender being the KAI KF-21 Boramae.

==== Saudi Arabia ====
In February 2022, La Tribune reported that Saudi Arabia is interested in the Rafale, then reported in December 2022 that Saudi Arabia would need between 100 and 200 fighters. In October 2023, Saudi Arabian authorities officially asked the French company Dassault Aviation to send a quote and a proposed delivery schedule for 54 Rafale F4 combat aircraft.

==== Ukraine ====
On 17 November 2025, the presidents of Ukraine and France signed a letter of intent on the purchase of up to 100 Rafale jets over a 10–year period. No schedule was given on the first delivery, with French officials citing a 3-year pilot training timeline. On 14 July 2026, Ukraine and France signed an agreement for the first tranche order of 16 Rafale, financed by a European Union loan facility. Training for Ukrainian personnel in France could start as early as 2026, and Ukraine would receive the first four aircraft shortly after they finished training.

=== Failed bids ===
The Rafale has been marketed for export to various countries. Various commentators and industry sources have highlighted the high cost of the aircraft as detrimental to the Rafale's sales prospects. Its acquisition cost is roughly US$100 million (2010), while its operational cost hovers around US$16,500 (2012) for every flight-hour. The Saab JAS 39 Gripen, in comparison, costs only US$4,700 per flight-hour to operate. According to a 2009 article by the Institute for Defense Studies and Analysis, unlike the American government and its relationship with Boeing and Lockheed Martin, the lack of communication between the French government and Dassault has hampered a worldwide cooperative sales effort, as demonstrated by the case with Morocco in 2007.

==== Bangladesh ====
In March 2020, La Tribune reported that France's Minister of the Armed Forces, Florence Parly, promoted the Rafale's performance to Bangladeshi Prime Minister Sheikh Hasina, who is also Minister of Defense. As of 2025, Bangladesh was in the process of acquiring the Eurofighter Typhoon.

==== Belgium ====
In 2009, Belgium suggested that they may buy F-35s in the 2020s to replace Belgium's 34 F-16A/B MLU fleet. An article published in Belgian newspaper L'Avenir on 19 April 2015 speculated that, if the nuclear strike role via Belgium's Nuclear sharing policy were retained in the request for proposals, Belgium would be almost forced to buy the F-35 as to maintain this role. Belgium officially launched its F-16 replacement program in March 2017, issuing requests for proposals to three European and two US manufacturers: Boeing Defense, Space & Security, Lockheed Martin, Dassault, Eurofighter GmbH and Saab Group, offering the F/A-18E/F Super Hornet, F-35 Lightning II, Rafale, Eurofighter Typhoon and Saab JAS 39 Gripen respectively. On 25 October 2018, Belgium officially selected the offer for 34 F-35As; government officials stated that it had come down to price, and that "The offer from the Americans was the best in all seven evaluation criteria". The total purchasing price for the aircraft and support until 2030 totaled €4 billion, €600 million cheaper than the budgeted €4.6 billion. In April 2020, the first F-35 contract was signed, with deliveries to begin in 2023.

==== Brazil ====
In June 2008, the Brazilian Air Force issued a request for information on the following aircraft: F/A-18E/F Super Hornet, F-16 Fighting Falcon, Rafale, Su-35, Gripen NG and Eurofighter Typhoon. In October 2008, the service selected three finalists for F-X2 – Dassault Rafale, Gripen NG and Boeing F/A-18E/F. On 5 January 2010, media reports stated that the final evaluation report by the Brazilian Air Force placed the Gripen ahead of the other two contenders based on unit and operating costs. In February 2011, Brazilian President Dilma Rousseff had reportedly decided in favour of the F/A-18. After Edward Snowden's revelation that the NSA had been intercepting Rouseff's private communications, and her ensuing fury, the Brazilian government selected the Gripen NG in December 2013 in a US$5 billion deal to equip the air force.

==== Canada ====
The Rafale was amongst various fighters proposed to replace the Royal Canadian Air Force's McDonnell Douglas CF-18 Hornet. In 2005, a report compiled by Canada's Department of Defence reviewing aircraft noted concerns over the Rafale's interoperability with US forces; Dassault had also been unable to confirm engine performance during cold weather conditions. In July 2010, the Canadian government announced the F-35 as the CF-18's replacement; the nation was already a partner in the Joint Strike Fighter program since 1997 and a Tier 3 partner for the F-35 since 2002. In December 2012, the Canadian government announced that the F-35 buy had been abandoned due to cost rises and that a fresh procurement process would begin. In January 2013, Dassault responded to Canada's request for information. Various aircraft were considered, including the F-35. In January 2014, Dassault offered a contract with full technology transfer, allowing Canada to perform its own support and upgrades, thereby lowering long-term service costs. In November 2018, Dassault withdrew from the competition, reportedly over interoperability and intelligence sharing requirements, particularly with the US, complicated by France's lack of involvement in the Five Eyes intelligence-sharing group.

==== Colombia ====
In June 2022, La Tribune reported Dassault made an offer for 15 fighters and 9 in option for the Colombian Air Force. Colombia was interested in used ones, but France denied, taking into consideration it already sold 24 jets to Croatia and Greece. On 21 December 2022, the Colombian government announced that they had shortlisted the Rafale for a potential 16 aircraft order to replace their aging Kfir. Nevertheless, on 3 January 2023, Colombia and Dassault explained they could not come to an agreement, mainly because of the high price-tag of the planes. On 1 April, Colombia issued a new RFP for new planes, with the Rafale, the Gripen and the F-16 as favorites. On 3 April 2025, Colombia announced it had selected the Gripen E/F to replace its Kfir fleet in a deal expected to include 16 to 24 units.

==== Finland ====
In June 2015, a working group set up by the Finnish MoD proposed starting the HX Fighter Program to replace the Finnish Air Force's current fleet of F/A-18 Hornets. The group recognises five potential types: Boeing F/A-18E/F Super Hornet, Dassault Rafale, Eurofighter Typhoon, Lockheed Martin F-35 Lightning II and Saab JAS 39 Gripen E/F. In December 2015, the Finnish MoD informed Great Britain, France, Sweden and the US informing them of the launch of the HX Fighter Program to replace the Hornet fleet, which will be decommissioned by 2025, with multi-role fighters; the Rafale is mentioned as a potential fighter. The request for information was sent in early 2016; five responses were received in November 2016. In December 2021, the Finnish newspaper Iltalehti reported that several foreign and security policy sources had confirmed the Finnish Defense Forces' recommendation of the F-35 as Finland's next fighter due to its "capability and expected long lifespan".

==== Kuwait ====
In February 2009, French President Nicolas Sarkozy announced that Kuwait was considering buying up to 28 Rafales. In October 2009, during a visit to Paris, the Kuwaiti Defence Minister expressed interest in the Rafale and said that he was awaiting Dassault's terms. Islamist lawmakers in the Kuwaiti national assembly threatened to block such a purchase, accusing the Defence Minister of lack of transparency and being manipulated by business interests. In January 2012, the French Defence Minister said that both Kuwait and Qatar were waiting to see if the UAE first purchased the Rafale and that Kuwait would look to buy 18–22 Rafales. However, on 11 September 2015, Eurofighter announced that an agreement had been reached with Kuwait to buy 28 Typhoons.

==== Libya ====
In January 2007, the French newspaper Journal du Dimanche reported that Libya sought 13 to 18 Rafales "in a deal worth as much as US$3.24 billion". In December 2007, Saif al-Islam Gaddafi declared Libya's interest in the Rafale, but no order was placed. French Rafales later attacked targets in Libya as part of the international military intervention during the 2011 Libyan civil war.

==== Morocco ====
In late 2007, La Tribune reported that a prospective US$2.85 billion sale to Morocco had fallen through, the government selecting the F-16C/D instead. While French Defense Minister Hervé Morin labelled it as overly sophisticated and too costly, defense analysts have said that miscalculations of the DGA's offer price and hesitations over financing were detrimental to the negotiations.

==== Oman ====
In February 2009, France offered Rafales to Oman to replace its ageing fleet of SEPECAT Jaguars. In December 2012, Oman placed an order for 12 Typhoons.

==== Singapore ====
In 2005, the Republic of Singapore Air Force launched its Next Generation Fighter (NGF) programme to replace its ageing A-4SU Super Skyhawks. Several options were considered and the Defence Science & Technology Agency (DSTA) conducted a detailed technical assessment, simulations and other tests to determine the final selection. This reduced the list of competitors to the Rafale and the F-15SG Strike Eagle. In December 2005, Singapore ordered 12 F-15SGs. According to Defense Industry Daily, key reasons for the selection were that, despite the Rafale's superior aerodynamics, it had insufficient range, weapons, and sensor integration.

==== South Korea ====
In 2002, the Republic of Korea Air Force chose the F-15K Slam Eagle over the Dassault Rafale, Eurofighter Typhoon and Sukhoi Su-35 for its 40 aircraft F-X Phase 1 fighter competition.

==== Switzerland ====
In February 2007, Switzerland was reportedly considering the Rafale and other fighters to replace its ageing Northrop F-5 Tiger IIs. A one-month evaluation started in October 2008 at Emmen Airforce Base, consisting of approximately 30 evaluation flights; the Rafale, along with the JAS 39 Gripen and the Typhoon, were evaluated. Although a leaked Swiss Air Force evaluation report revealed that the Rafale won the competition on technical grounds, (Note: Quote: "The Rafale was the clear winner of the SAF evaluation, with the Eurofighter second, but the Swiss government opted for the cheaper Gripen package.") on 30 November 2011, the Swiss Federal Council announced plans to buy 22 Gripen NGs due to its lower acquisition and maintenance costs. Due to a referendum, this purchase never happened.

In March 2018, Swiss officials named contenders in its Air 2030 program: The Rafale, Saab Gripen, Eurofighter Typhoon, Boeing F/A-18E/F Super Hornet and Lockheed Martin F-35. In October 2018, the Swiss Air Force was reportedly limited to buying a single-engine fighter for budgetary reasons. In May 2019, the Rafale performed demonstration flights at Payerne Air Base for comparison against other bids. On 30 June 2021, the Swiss Federal Council proposed to Parliament the acquisition of 36 F-35As at a cost of up to 6 billion Swiss francs (US$6.5 billion), citing the aircraft's cost- and combat-effectiveness. However, it was later confirmed that the costs are capped for a period of just 10 years. The Liberal Greens have promised to examine the F-35's environmental impact. The Swiss anti-military group GSoA intended to contest the purchase in another national referendum supported by the Green Party of Switzerland and the Social Democratic Party of Switzerland (which previously managed to block the Gripen). In August 2022, they registered the initiative, with 120,000 people having signed in less than a year (with 100,000 required).

On 15 September 2022, the Swiss National council gave the Federal council permission to sign the purchase deal, with a time limit for signing of March 2023. The deal to buy 36 F-35A was signed on 19 September 2022, with deliveries to commence in 2027 and conclude by 2030, bypassing the popular initiative.

==== Uzbekistan ====
On 26 November 2023, French President Emmanuel Macron offered Rafale to both Kazakhstan and Uzbekistan governments, according to La Tribune. Scramble reported that Uzbekistan is interested in buying 24 Rafales, citing the source in France government. Uzbekistan instead placed an order for J-10CEs in 2025, and started receiving them that year.

== Variants ==
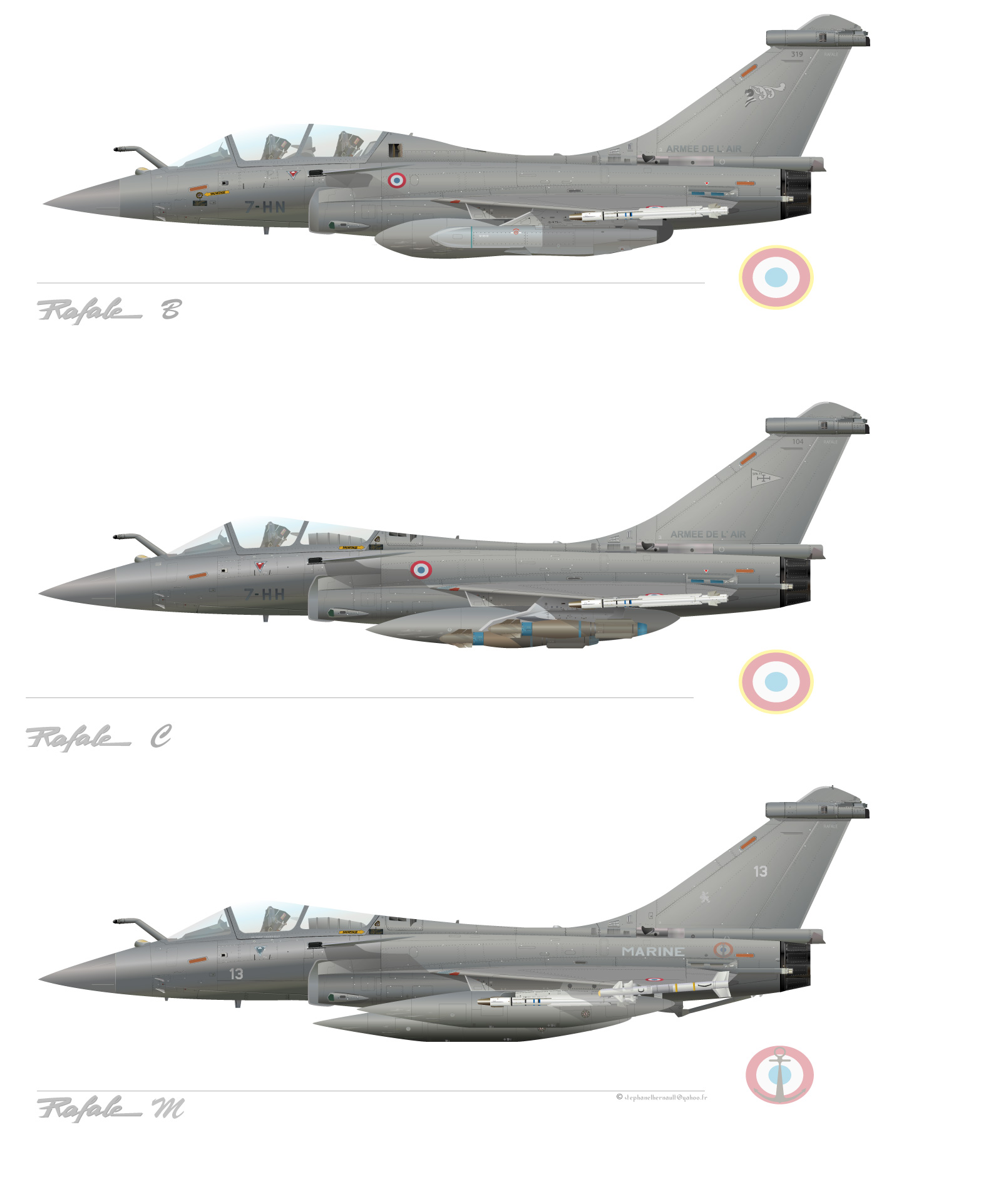
Rafale B/C and M

=== French variants ===
Rafale A
Technology demonstrator, first flew in 1986.
Rafale D
Dassault used this designation (D for discret) in the early 1990s to emphasise the new semi-stealthy design features.
Rafale B
Two-seater version for the French Air and Space Force.
Rafale C
Same as Rafale B but single-seat version for the French Air and Space Force.
Rafale M
Similar to Rafale C, but with modifications to allow operations from CATOBAR – equipped aircraft carriers. For carrier operations, the M model has a strengthened airframe, longer nose gear leg to provide a more nose-up attitude, larger tailhook between the engines, and a built-in boarding ladder. Consequently, the Rafale M weighs about 500 kg (1,100 lb) more than the Rafale C. It is the only non-US fighter type cleared to operate from the decks of US carriers, using catapults and their arresting gear, as demonstrated in 2008 when six Rafales from Flottille 12F integrated into the USS Theodore Roosevelt Carrier Air Wing interoperability exercise.
Rafale N
Originally called the Rafale BM, was a planned missile-only two-seater version for the Aéronavale. Budgetary constraints have been cited as grounds for its cancellation.
Rafale R
Proposed reconnaissance-oriented variant.

=== Export variants ===
Rafale DM
Two-seater version for the Egyptian Air Force.
Rafale EM
Single-seat version for the Egyptian Air Force.
Rafale DH
Two-seater version for the Indian Air Force.
Rafale EH
Single-seat version for the Indian Air Force.
Rafale EU
Single-seat version for the United Arab Emirates Air Force.: Rafale DU: Two-seater version for the United Arab Emirates Air Force.
Rafale MH
Single-seater version for the Indian Navy; customized carrier-capable variant of the Rafale M, adapted for STOBAR and Indian weapon systems.
Rafale DQ
Two-seater version for the Qatar Emiri Air Force.
Rafale EQ
Single-seat version for the Qatar Emiri Air Force.
Rafale DG
Two-seater version for the Hellenic Air Force.
Rafale EG
Single-seat version for the Hellenic Air Force.
Rafale DI
Two-seater version for the Indonesian Air Force.
Rafale EI
Single-seat version for the Indonesian Air Force.

== Operators ==
=== Summary ===
Dassault Rafale orders / deliveries / status summary
Operators	Contract	Orders						Deliveries						Losses	Second-hand [+ / -]	Retired	In service	Notes
Operators	Contract	F1	F2	F3	F3R	F4	Total	F1	F2	F3	F3R	F4	Total	Losses	Second-hand [+ / -]	Retired	In service	Notes
France	May 1997	13	–	–	–	–	234	13	48	119	–	11	191	7	12; 12	0	160	
France	Jan 1999	–	48	–	–	–	234	13	48	119	–	11	191	7	12; 12	0	160	
France	Dec 2004	–	–	59	–	–	234	13	48	119	–	11	191	7	12; 12	0	160	
France	Nov 2009	–	–	60	–	–	234	13	48	119	–	11	191	7	12; 12	0	160	
France	Jan 2021	–	–	–	–	–	234	13	48	119	–	11	191	7	12; 12	0	160	Sold to Greece.
France	Jan 2021	–	–	–	–	12	234	13	48	119	–	11	191	7	12; 12	0	160	11 delivered.
France	Nov 2021	–	–	–	–	–	234	13	48	119	–	11	191	7	12; 12	0	160	Sold to Croatia.
France	Jan 2024	–	–	–	–	42	234	13	48	119	–	11	191	7	12; 12	0	160	Delivery from 2027.
Croatia	Nov 2021	–	–	–	–	–	0	–	–	–	–	–	0	0	+ 12	0	12	Purchased from France. Delivered by April 2025.
Egypt	Feb 2015	–	–	24	–	–	55	–	–	24	31	–	55	N/A	0	0	55	Delivery completed by 2019. Potential loss 2019.
Egypt	May 2021	–	–	–	30	–	55	–	–	24	31	–	55	N/A	0	0	55	Delivered from 2024 to 2026.
Egypt	2021	–	–	–	1	–	55	–	–	24	31	–	55	N/A	0	0	55	Delivered from 2024 to 2026.
Greece	Jan 2021	–	–	–	6	–	12	–	–	–	12	–	12	0	+ 12	0	24	All 24 Rafale delivered by January 2025.
Greece	Mar 2022	–	–	–	6	–	12	–	–	–	12	–	12	0	+ 12	0	24	All 24 Rafale delivered by January 2025.
India	Sep 2016	–	–	–	36	–	62	–	–	–	36	–	36	N/A	0	0	36	Potential loss (operation Sindoor).
India	Apr 2025	–	–	–	–	26	62	–	–	–	36	–	36	N/A	0	0	36	Potential loss (operation Sindoor).
Indonesia	Feb 2022	–	–	–	–	42	42	–	–	–	–	6	6	0	0	0	6	Deliveries ongoing.
Qatar	May 2015	–	–	24	–	–	36	–	–	24	12	–	36	0	0	0	36	Deliveries 2019 - 2022.
Qatar	Dec 2017	–	–	–	12	–	36	–	–	24	12	–	36	0	0	0	36	Deliveries 2019 - 2022.
Serbia	Aug 2024	–	–	–	–	12	12	–	–	–	–	0	0	0	0	0	0	Deliveries planned by 2029.
United Arab Emirates	Dec 2021	–	–	–	–	80	80	–	–	–	–	0	0	0	0	0	0	Deliveries planned for 2027 - 2031.
Total		13	48	167	91	214	533	13	48	167	91	17	336	7	0	0	329	

=== Current operators ===
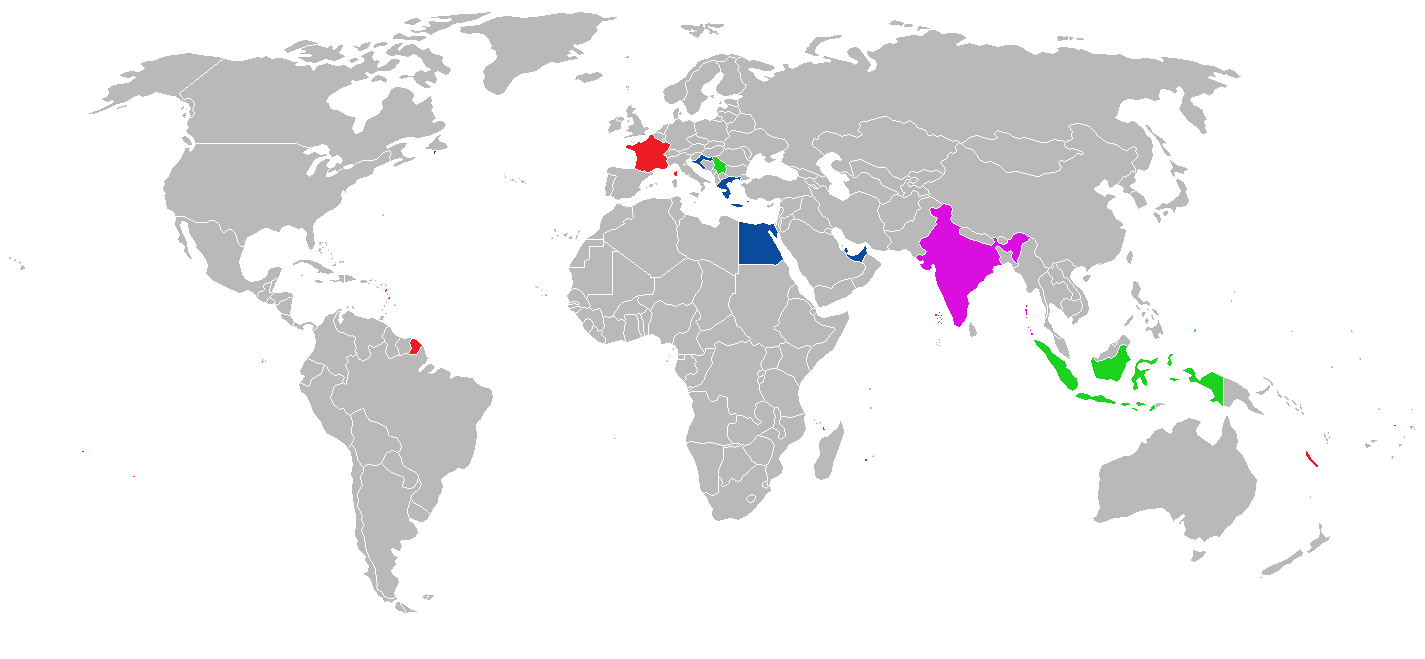
Operators of the Dassult Rafale in 2025 Operators of Both Naval and Land Based Rafales Operators of land-based Rafales Operators of land-based Rafales and Future operators of naval Rafales Future operators

Croatia

- Croatian Air Force – 12 ex-French C/B F3-R Rafales, consisting of 10 single-seat C F3-R and 2x two-seat B F3-R fighters. The first six were delivered on 25 April 2024 (2 B + 4 C) with the remaining six single-seaters were to be delivered in 2025. In October 2023, Croatia officially acquired the first aircraft at a ceremony at Mont-de-Marsan Air Base. The 12th Rafale was delivered on 25 April 2025. On 8 December 2025 in France, Croatian Defence Minister, and the French Minister for Armed Forces signed a contract Letter of Intent for further upgrading 12 Rafale aircraft from the Rafale F3-R standard to enhanced capabilities of the Rafale F4 standard.
  - 191st Fighter Aircraft Squadron

Egypt

- Egyptian Air Force – 54 ordered with 32 Rafales delivered as of 2019.

France
In 2025 France informed that it plan to order a total of 286 Rafale by 2035 following the budget plan for 2026, with an additional order of up to 61 units. The previous orders was of 234 units. This order was made to reach and maintain the total number of Rafale to 225 active units by 2035, since France sold to Croatia (12) and Greece (12) from its own stock and lost 2 units in the 2024 collision crash and to replace older models that entered service in 1999. As of 2026, 189 units were delivered to the French Armed Forces, with 12 units sold to Greece and another 12 to Croatia, France currently operates around 165 Rafale. 124 in the Air and Space Force and 41 in the Navy. Once the deliveries of 286 units completed, France is expected to field 225 units. 185 for the Air and Space Force and 40 for the Navy. Option for up to 30 additional units to complement the 225 was mentioned by the Minister of the Defense in early 2025. Potentially raising the total fleet to 255 units.

- French Air and Space Force – ~124; flying units include:
  - Saint-Dizier – Robinson Air Base
    - Escadron de Chasse 2/4 La Fayette (2018–present) nuclear strike
    - Escadron de Chasse 1/7 Provence (2006–2016) multirole fighter
    - Escadron de Chasse 1/4 Gascogne (2009–present) nuclear strike
    - Escadron de Transformation Rafale 3/4 Aquitaine (October 2010–present, Rafale Operational Conversion Unit (OCU) jointly operated by French Air and Space Force and French Naval Aviation)
  - Mont-de-Marsan Air Base
    - Escadron de Chasse 2/30 Normandie-Niemen (2012–present) multirole fighter
    - Escadron de Chasse 3/30 Lorraine (2016–present) multirole fighter
    - Escadron de chasse et d'expérimentation 1/30 Côte d'Argent (2004–present) tactics development and evaluation
  - Orange-Caritat Air Base
    - Escadron de Chasse 1/5 Vendée (2024–present) multirole fighter
  - Al Dhafra Air Base, UAE
    - Escadron de Chasse 3/30 Lorraine (2010–2016) multirole fighter
    - Escadron de Chasse 1/7 Provence (2016–present) multirole fighter
- French Navy – 46 delivered, 41 active
  - Naval Air Base Landivisiau
    - Flottille 11F (2011–present) multirole carrier fighter
    - Flottille 12F (2001–present) multirole carrier fighter
    - Flottille 17F (2016–present) multirole carrier fighter

Greece

- Hellenic Air Force – Greece ordered 18 Rafales F-3R in 2020, and an additional 6 in 2021. The first was delivered on 21 July 2021. All 24 have been delivered to the Hellenic Air Force as of January 2025.
  - Tanagra Air Base
    - 332nd All Weather Squadron (Hawks)

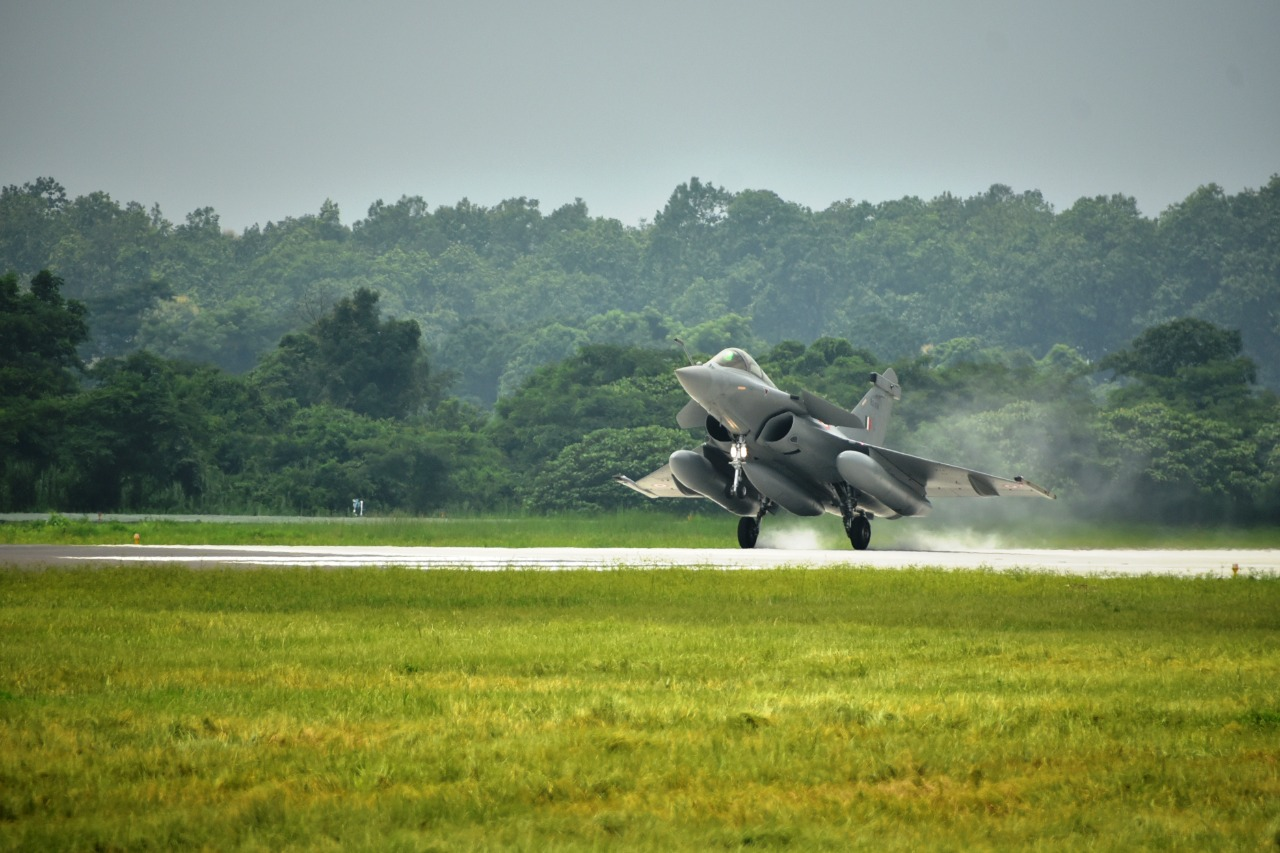
IAF Dassault Rafale landing at Hasimara AFS

India

- Indian Air Force – 36 Rafale F3-Rs ordered (28 Rafale EH and 8 Rafale DH), all delivered by July 2022. A deal for additional 114 units of F4 variants was accorded Acceptance of Necessity by Defence Acquisition Council in February 2026.
  - Ambala AFS
    - No. 17 Squadron (Golden Arrows)
  - Hasimara AFS
    - No. 101 Squadron (Falcons)
- Indian Navy – 26 Rafale F4s (22 Rafale-M and 4 twin-seater) on order to be delivered by 2030.

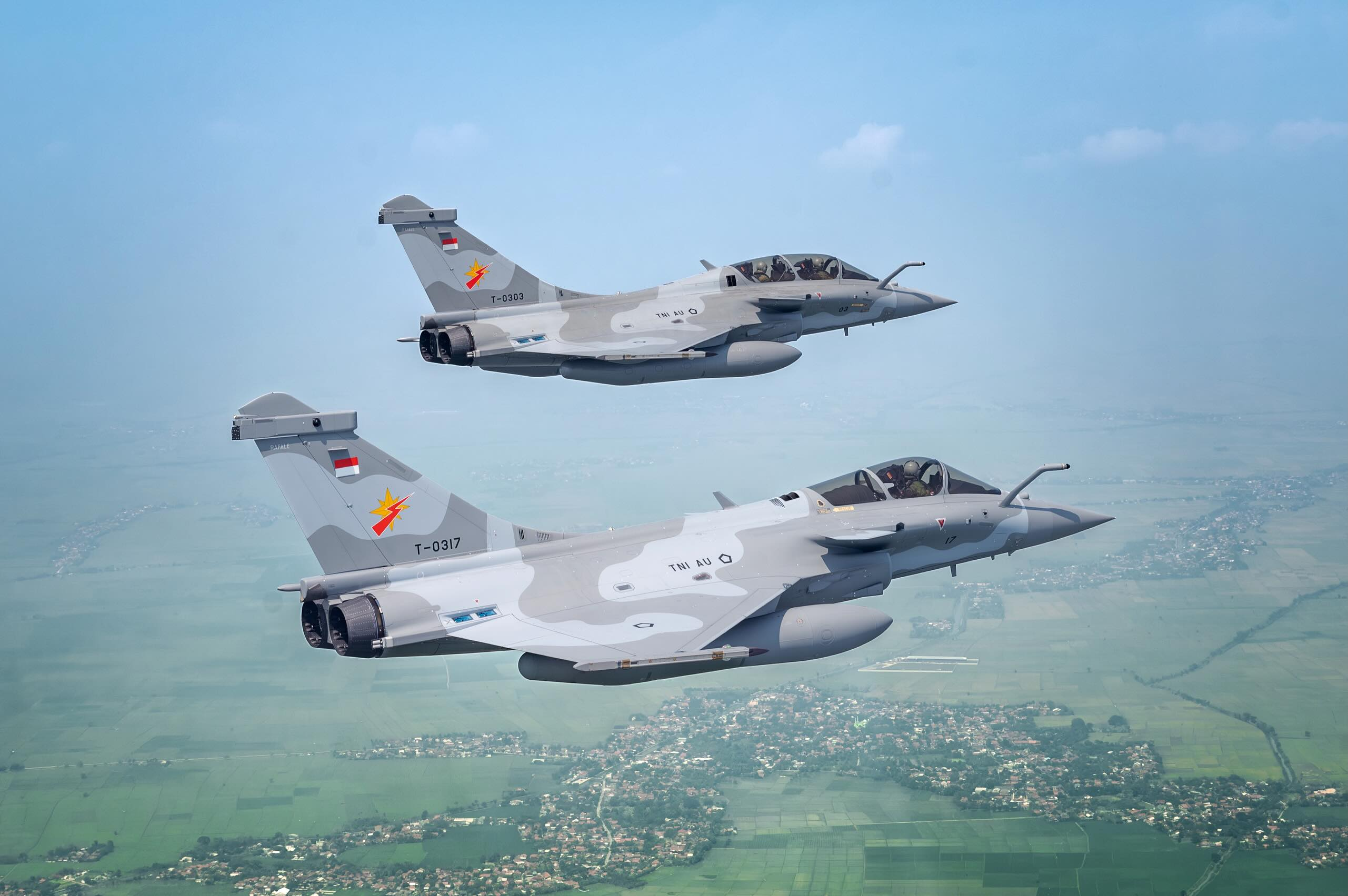
Indonesian Air Force Rafale EI/DI F4.1 flying over the countryside

Indonesia

- Indonesian Air Force – 42 Rafale F4s ordered with 6 delivered as of May 2026. The first batch of Rafales were ceremonially received on 28 November 2025, and delivered on 23 January 2026.
  - 31st Air Wing
    - 1st Air Squadron (Equatorial Eagles) – Supadio AFB, Pontianak (planned)
    - 12th Air Squadron (Black Panther) – Roesmin Nurjadin AFB, Pekanbaru (2026–present)
    - 16th Air Squadron (Rydders) – Roesmin Nurjadin AFB, Pekanbaru (planned)

Serbia

- Serbian Air Force and Air Defence – 12 aircraft (F4 version) ordered in 2024 with deliveries to be completed by 2029.

Qatar

- Qatar Emiri Air Force – 36 ordered, all delivered. Qatar ordered 24 of the fighters in 2015, and 12 more in 2018. It also has an option to order 36 more. As of 2023, all aircraft were delivered.
  - Dukhan / Tamim Airbase
    - 1st Fighter Squadron 'Al Adiyat'

United Arab Emirates

- United Arab Emirates Air Force – 80 Rafale F4s on order. The first was ceremonially delivered on 29 January 2025.

== Notable accidents ==
- On 6 December 2007, a French Air Force twin-seat Rafale crashed during a training flight. The pilot, who suffered from spatial disorientation, died in the accident.
- On 24 September 2009, after unarmed test flights, two French Navy Rafales returning to the aircraft carrier Charles de Gaulle, collided in mid-air about 30 kilometres (19 mi) from the town of Perpignan in southwest France. One test pilot, identified as François Duflot, died in the accident, while the other was rescued.
- On 28 November 2010, a Rafale from the carrier Charles de Gaulle crashed in the Arabian Sea. This aircraft was supporting Allied operations in Afghanistan. The pilot ejected safely and was rescued by a rescue helicopter from the carrier. Later reports said the engines stopped after being starved of fuel due to confusion by the pilot in switching fuel tanks.
- On 2 July 2012, during a joint exercise, a Rafale from the carrier Charles de Gaulle plunged into the Mediterranean Sea. The pilot ejected safely and was recovered by an American search and rescue helicopter from the carrier USS Dwight D. Eisenhower.
- On 14 August 2024, two French Rafale B two-seaters collided over Colombey-les-Belles. While one pilot had ejected before crashing into the ground, the trainee and instructor of the second aircraft were reported missing. Both aircraft were based in Saint-Dizier – Robinson Air Base. By 15 August, the death of the missing pilots was announced.

== Specifications (Rafale C, B and M) ==
Dassault Rafale 3-view drawing

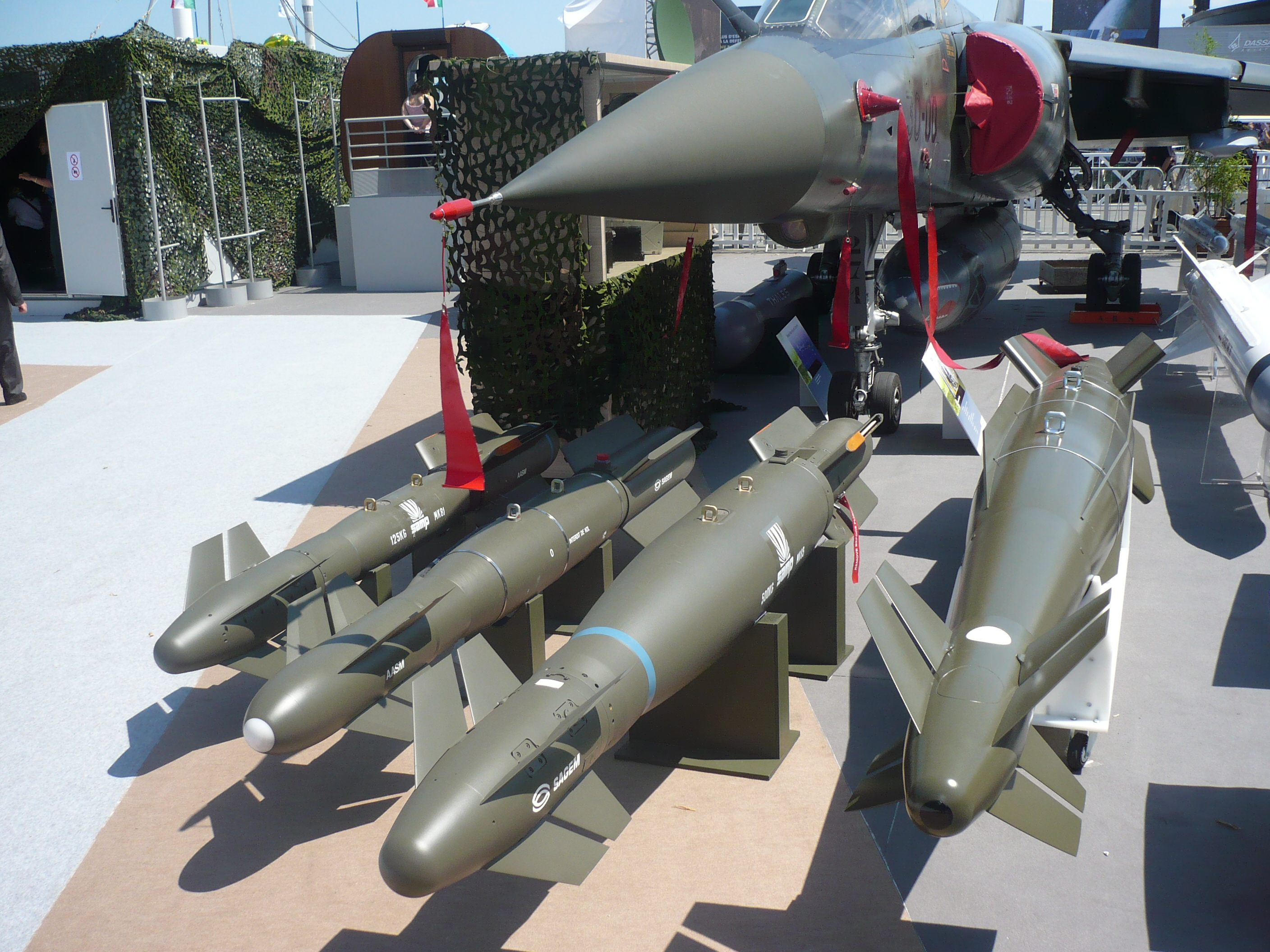
AASM-Hammer family of weapons

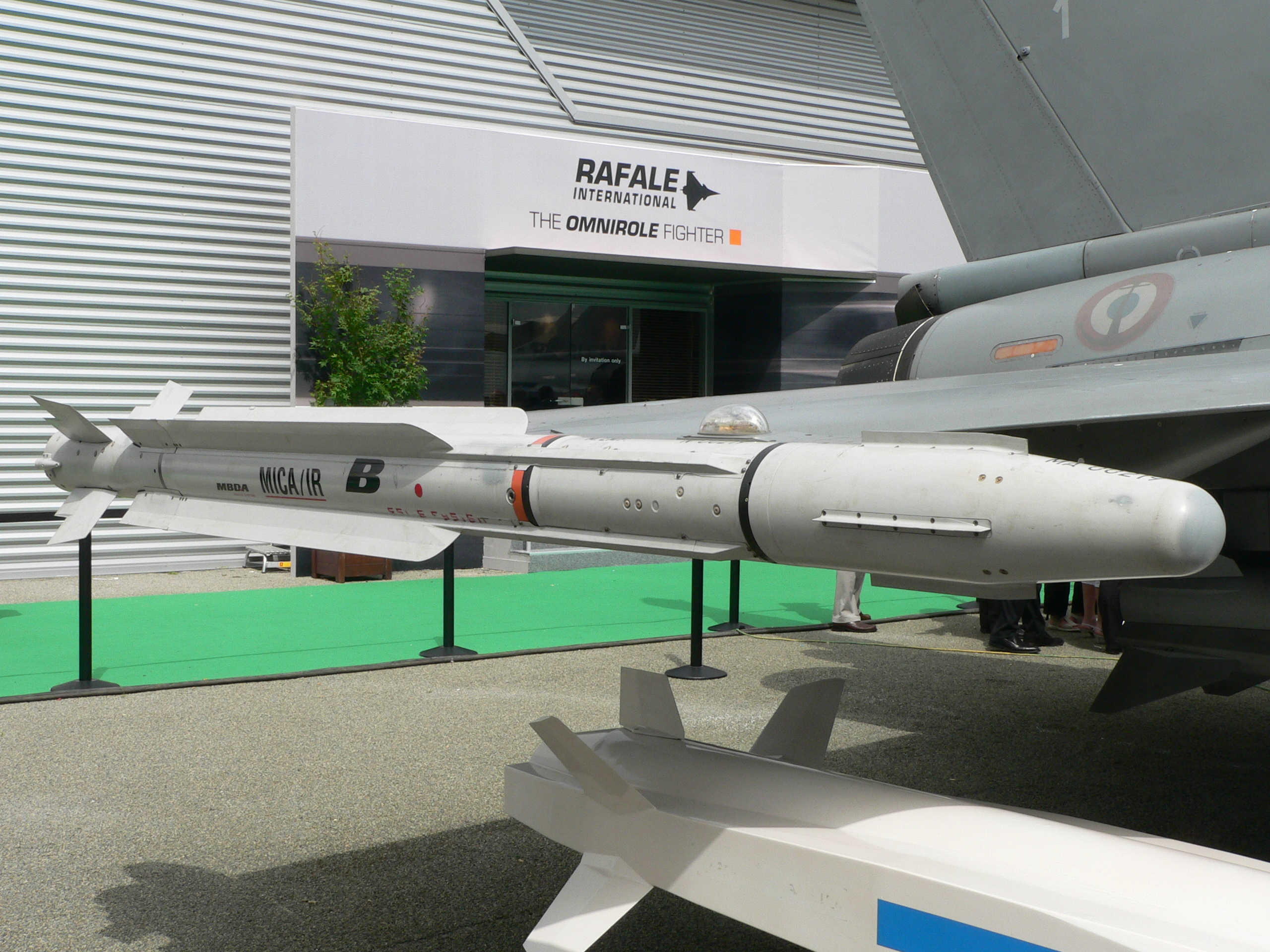
MICA: short- to medium-range air-to-air missile

Data from Dassault Aviation, Superfighters, French Navy, International Directory of Military Aircraft

General characteristics

- Crew: 1 or 2
- Length: 15.27 m (50 ft 1 in)
- Wingspan: 10.90 m (35 ft 9 in)
- Height: 5.34 m (17 ft 6 in)
- Wing area: 45.7 m^{2} (492 sq ft)
- Empty weight: 10,300 kg (22,708 lb) (B)

9,850 kg (21,720 lb) (C)
10,600 kg (23,400 lb) (M)

- Gross weight: 15,000 kg (33,069 lb)
- Max takeoff weight: 24,500 kg (54,013 lb)
- Fuel capacity: 4,700 kg (10,362 lb) internal for single-seater (C); 4,400 kg (9,700 lb) for two-seater (B)
- With external tanks: 4,700 kg (10,362 lb) internal and 6,700 kg (14,771 lb) external
- Maximum fuel: (C): 16,550 L (4,370 US gal; 3,640 imp gal) 5,750 L (1,520 US gal; 1,260 imp gal) internal + 2,300 L (610 US gal; 510 imp gal) in 2x conformal tanks
- Powerplant: 2 × Snecma M88-4e turbofans, 50.00 kN (11,240 lbf) thrust each dry, 75.00 kN (16,860 lbf) with afterburner

Performance

- Maximum speed: 1,912 km/h (1,188 mph, 1,032 kn) / Mach 1.8 at high altitude

1,390 km/h; 860 mph; 750 kn / Mach 1.1 at low altitude

- Supercruise: on 4 missiles and a 1250-liter belly droptank
  - Mach 1.4 supercruise on Rafale M (navy) version with 6 MICA air-to-air missiles
- Combat range: 1,056 km (656 mi, 570 nmi) hi-lo-hi, on penetration mission with three tanks (5,700 L combined), two SCALP-EG and four MICA AAMs
- Ferry range: 3,700 km (2,300 mi, 2,000 nmi) with 3 drop tanks
- Service ceiling: 15,835 m (51,952 ft)
- g limits: +9 −3.6 (+11 in emergencies)
- Rate of climb: 304.8 m/s (60,000 ft/min)
- Wing loading: 328 kg/m^{2} (67 lb/sq ft)

Armament

- Guns: 1× 30 mm (1.2 in) GIAT 30/M791 autocannon with 125 rounds
- Hardpoints: 14 External hardpoints for Air and Space Force versions (Rafale B/C), 13 for Navy version (Rafale M) with a capacity of 9,500 kg (20,900 lb) external fuel and ordnance, with provisions to carry combinations of:
  - Missiles:
    - Air-to-air:
      - MICA EM and IR (most widely used air-to-air missiles on Rafale; MICA-EM and MICA-IR both used for short-range and also for medium-range BVR combat)
      - Meteor
      - Magic II
    - Air-to-surface:
      - MBDA Apache
      - MBDA Storm Shadow/SCALP-EG
      - AASM-Hammer (SBU-38/54/64)
      - GBU-12 Paveway II, GBU-16 Paveway II, GBU-22 Paveway III, GBU-24 Paveway III, GBU-49 Enhanced Paveway II
      - AS-30L
      - Mark 82
      - MBDA AM 39-Exocet air-launched anti-ship missile (one AM 39-Exocet at the central under-fuselage hardpoint)
      - MBDA Stratus cruise/anti-ship missile (in development)
    - Nuclear Deterrence:
      - ASMP-A nuclear missile
      - ASN4G hypersonic nuclear missile (in development)
  - Other:
    - Thales Damocles targeting pod
    - Thales AREOS (Airborne Recce Observation System) reconnaissance pod
    - Thales TALIOS multi-function targeting pod
    - Up to 5 drop tanks
    - Buddy–buddy refueling pod

Avionics

- Thales RBE2-AA AESA radar
- Thales SPECTRA Electronic Warfare (EW) system
- Thales/SAGEM Optronique Secteur Frontal (OSF) Infrared search and track (IRST) system

== See also ==
- Fourth-generation jet fighter

Aircraft of comparable role, configuration, and era

- Shenyang J-15
- Boeing F/A-18E/F Super Hornet
- Eurofighter Typhoon
- Mikoyan MiG-29K
- HAL TEDBF

Related lists

- List of fighter aircraft
- List of military aircraft of France

== Bibliography ==
- "Rafale A Demonstrates Vertical Acceleration, Climb Performance". Aviation Week & Space Technology. 125 (16). New York: McGraw-Hill: 78–79. 20 October 1986. ISSN 0005-2175.
- "France prepared to 'go it alone' on ACX". Flight International. 123 (3850). Surrey, UK: Reed Business Information: 445. 13–19 January 1983. ISSN 0015-3710. Archived from the original on 11 April 2013.
- "Air Superiority". Flight International. 124 (3892). Surrey, UK: Reed Business Information: 1509. 4–10 December 1983. ISSN 0015-3710. Archived from the original on 1 November 2010.
- "How to Survive a Dogfight Blackout". New Scientist. 109. London: Reed Business Information: 33. 20 March 1986. ISSN 0262-4079.
- "Military Aircraft of the World". Flight International. 140 (4281). London: Reed Business Information: 34. 21–27 August 1991. ISSN 0015-3710. Archived from the original on 25 August 2013.
- "France orders more Rafales". Flight International. 145 (4410). London: 27. 2–8 March 1994. ISSN 0015-3710. Archived from the original on 20 December 2014.
- Buttler, Tony (2000). British Secret Projects: Jet Fighters Since 1950. Hinckley, UK: Midland Publishing. ISBN 978-1-85780-095-1.
- Carbonel, Jean-Christophe (2016). French Secret Projects. Vol. 1: Post War Fighters. Manchester, UK: Crecy Publishing. ISBN 978-1-91080-900-6.
- Cook, Nick (1 November 1997). "Rafale sets new standards in digital assembly". Interavia Business & Technology. Aerospace Media Publishing: 22–24. ISSN 0983-1592.
- Eden, Paul, ed. (2004). The Encyclopedia of Modern Military Aircraft. London: Amber Books. ISBN 978-1-904687-84-9.
- Fiszer, Michal (1 June 2005). "Storm warning: the Dassault Rafale is poised to become Europe's premier fighter-bomber". Journal of Electronic Defense. 28 (6). Association of Old Crows: 40–51. ISSN 0192-429X.
- Forsberg, Randall, ed. (1994). The Arms Production Dilemma: Contraction and Restraint in the World Combat Aircraft Industry. Cambridge, MA: MIT Press. ISBN 978-0-262-56085-6.
- Frawley, Gerard (2002). The International Directory of Military Aircraft. Fyshwick, AU: Aerospace Publications. ISBN 978-1-875671-55-7.
- Gaines, Mike (4–10 June 1989). "Rafale: Dassault's New Dawn". Flight International. 135 (4168). London: 80–88. ISSN 0015-3710. Archived from the original on 20 January 2014.
- Jarrett, D. N. (2005). Cockpit Engineering. Surrey, UK: Ashgate Publishing. ISBN 978-0-7546-1751-8.
- Lenorovitz, Jeffrey (23 June 1986). "Rafale Serves as Testbed for French Systems". Aviation Week & Space Technology. 124 (25). New York: McGraw-Hill: 79. ISSN 0005-2175.
- ——— (5 November 1990). "Rafale Debut Opens Way for Flight Test Program". Aviation Week & Space Technology. 133 (19). New York: McGraw-Hill: 20–22. ISSN 0005-2175.
- Lorell, Mark; Hoffman, Donna (1989). The Use of Prototypes in Selected Foreign Fighter Aircraft Development Programs – Rafale, EAP, Lavi, and Gripen. RAND Corporation. ISBN 0-8330-0970-2.
- MacKenzie, Christina (19–25 March 2002). "Rafale Readies". Flight International. 161 (4824). London: 36–37. ISSN 0015-3710.
- Richardson, Doug (2001). Stealth Warplanes. Grand Rapids, MI: Zenith Imprint. ISBN 978-0-7603-1051-9.
- Sedbon, Gilbert (26 January – 1 February 1986a). "Rafale partners sought formally". Flight International. 129 (3996). London: 11. ISSN 0015-3710. Archived from the original on 11 April 2013.
- ——— (6–12 July 1986b). "Dassault flies Rafale demonstrator". Flight International. 130 (4019). London: 4. ISSN 0015-3710. Archived from the original on 11 April 2013.
- Sedbon, Gilbert (14–20 February 1988). "Crouzet controls by voice". Flight International. 133 (4101). London: 30–31. ISSN 0015-3710. Archived from the original on 27 August 2013.
- ———; Norris, Guy (10–16 April 1991). "Power to Progress". Flight International. 139 (4262). London: 32–36. ISSN 0015-3710. Archived from the original on 13 January 2010.
- Sparaco, Pierre (18 November 1996). "France Seeks Early Export Orders". Aviation Week & Space Technology. 145 (21). New York: McGraw-Hill: 29. ISSN 0005-2175.
- Spick, Mike, ed. (2000). The Great Book of Modern Warplanes. St. Paul, MN: MBI Publishing. ISBN 978-1-84065-156-0.
- Svitak, Amy; Bruneau, Caroline (8–21 June 2015). "Fasionably Late". Aviation Week & Space Technology. 177 (11). New York: McGraw-Hill: 59–60. ISSN 0005-2175.
- Sweetman, Bill (1 November 2002). "Killer angels: France's Rafale has fire, but will glory remain a mirage?". Journal of Electronic Defense. 25 (11). Association of Old Crows: 44–48. ISSN 0192-429X.
- Williams, Mel, ed. (2002). "Dassault Rafale". Superfighters, The Next Generation of Combat Aircraft. London: AIRtime Publishing. ISBN 978-1-880588-53-6.
- Wertheim, Eric (2007). Naval Institute Guide to Combat Fleets of the World: Their Ships, Aircraft, and Systems. Annapolis, MD: Naval Institute Press. ISBN 978-1-59114-955-2.
