= Fourth-generation fighter =

Classification of fighter aircraft c. 1970–2000

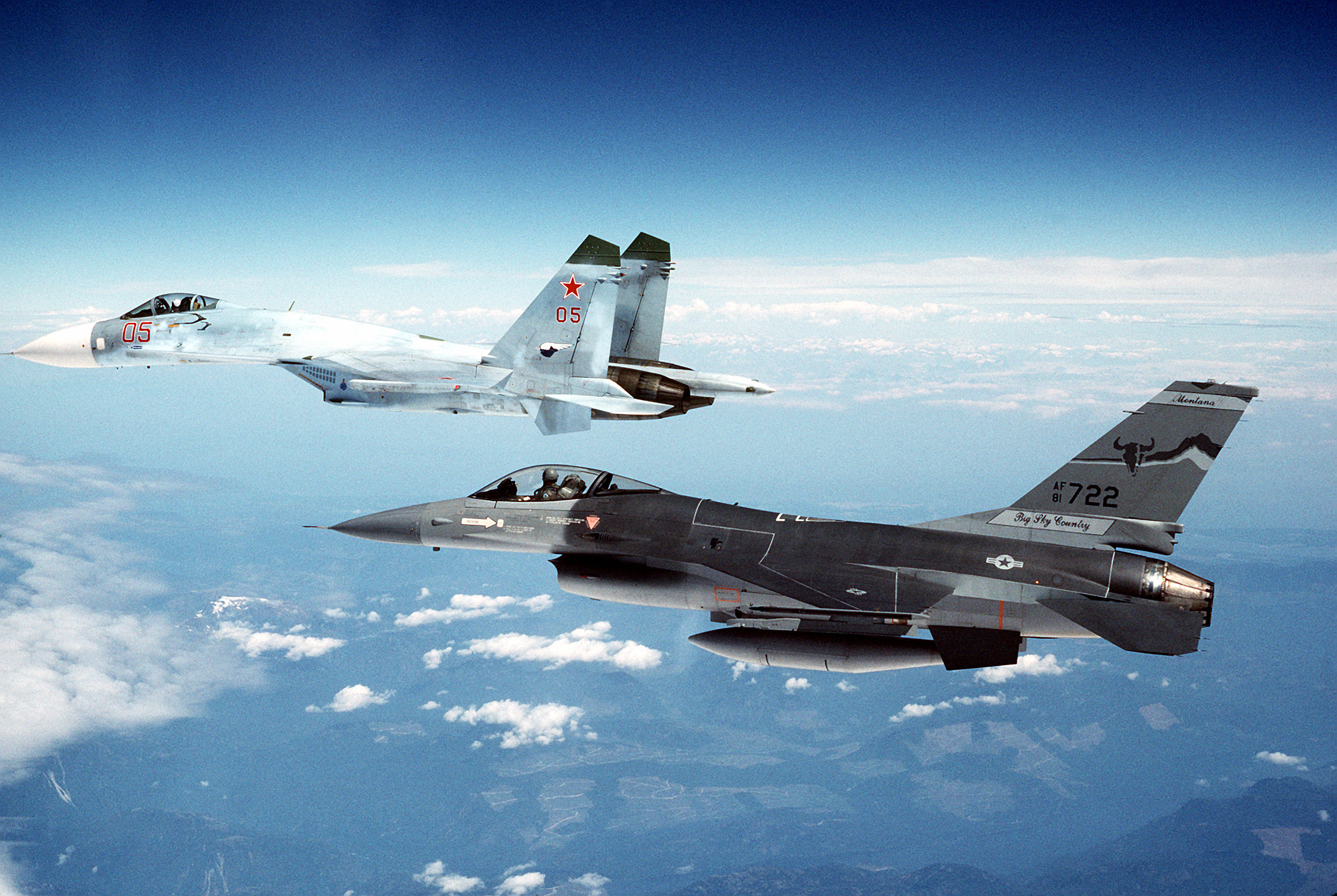
- A Sukhoi Su-27 (background) and General Dynamics F-16 Fighting Falcon (foreground), fourth-generation fighters used by the Soviet Air Force and United States Air Force respectively

General information
- Type: Fighter aircraft
- National origin: Multi-national
- Status: In service

History
- Introduction date: 1980s
- First flight: 1970s
- Developed from: Third-generation fighter
- Developed into: Fifth-generation fighter

The fourth-generation fighter is a class of jet fighters in service from around 1980 to the present, and represents design concepts of the 1970s. Fourth-generation designs are heavily influenced by lessons learned from the previous generation of combat aircraft. Third-generation fighters were often designed primarily as interceptors, being built around speed and air-to-air missiles. While exceptionally fast in a straight line, many third-generation fighters severely lacked in maneuverability, as doctrine held that traditional dogfighting would be impossible at supersonic speeds. In practice, air-to-air missiles of the time, despite being responsible for the vast majority of air-to-air victories, were relatively unreliable, and combat would quickly become subsonic and close-range. This would leave third-generation fighters vulnerable and ill-equipped, renewing an interest in manoeuvrability for the fourth generation of fighters. Meanwhile, the growing costs of military aircraft in general and the demonstrated success of aircraft such as the McDonnell Douglas F-4 Phantom II gave rise to the popularity of multirole combat aircraft in parallel with the advances marking the so-called fourth generation.

During this period, maneuverability was enhanced by relaxed static stability, made possible by introduction of the fly-by-wire (FBW) flight-control system, which in turn was possible due to advances in digital computers and system-integration techniques. Replacement of analog avionics, required to enable FBW operations, became a fundamental requirement as legacy analog computer systems began to be replaced by digital flight-control systems in the latter half of the 1980s. The further advance of microcomputers in the 1980s and 1990s permitted rapid upgrades to the avionics over the lifetimes of these fighters, incorporating system upgrades such as active electronically scanned array (AESA), digital avionics buses, and infra-red search and track.

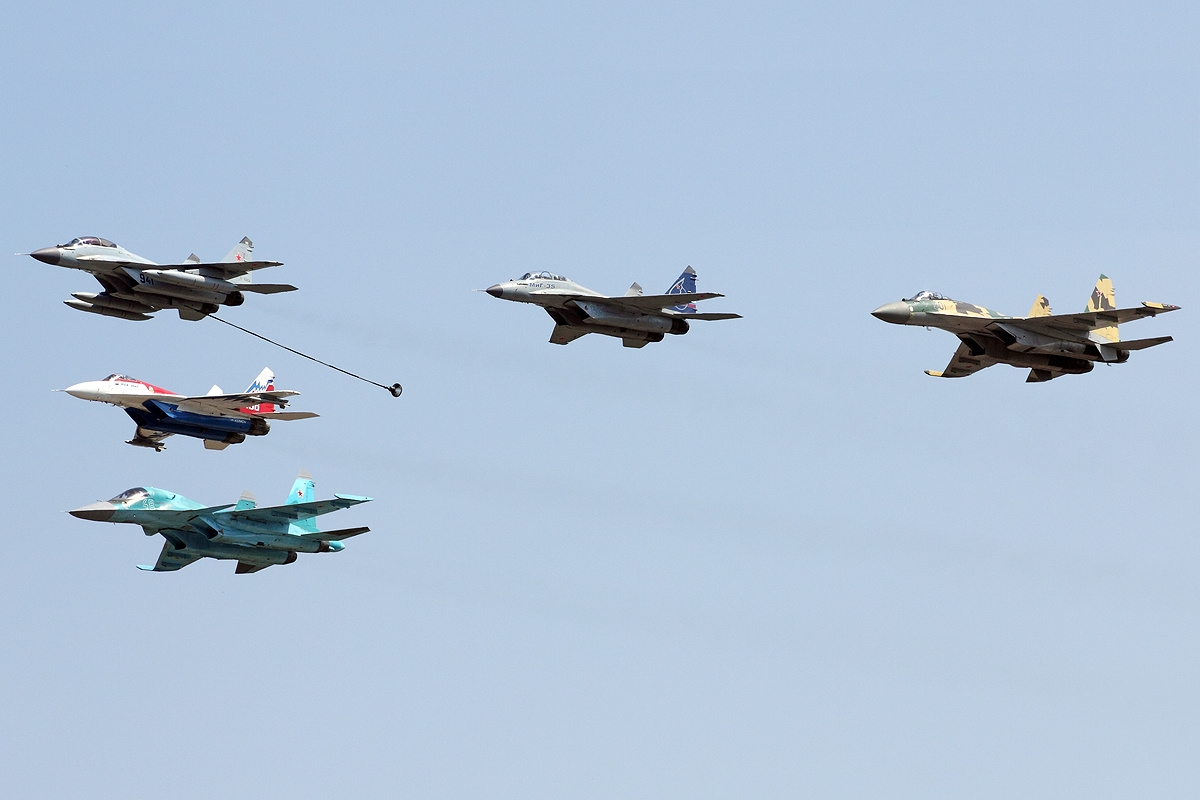
Su-34, MiG-29OVT, MiG-29K, MiG-35, and Su-35 of United Aircraft Corporation. They are ultimate developments of the MiG-29 and Su-27, which are early fourth-generation platforms.

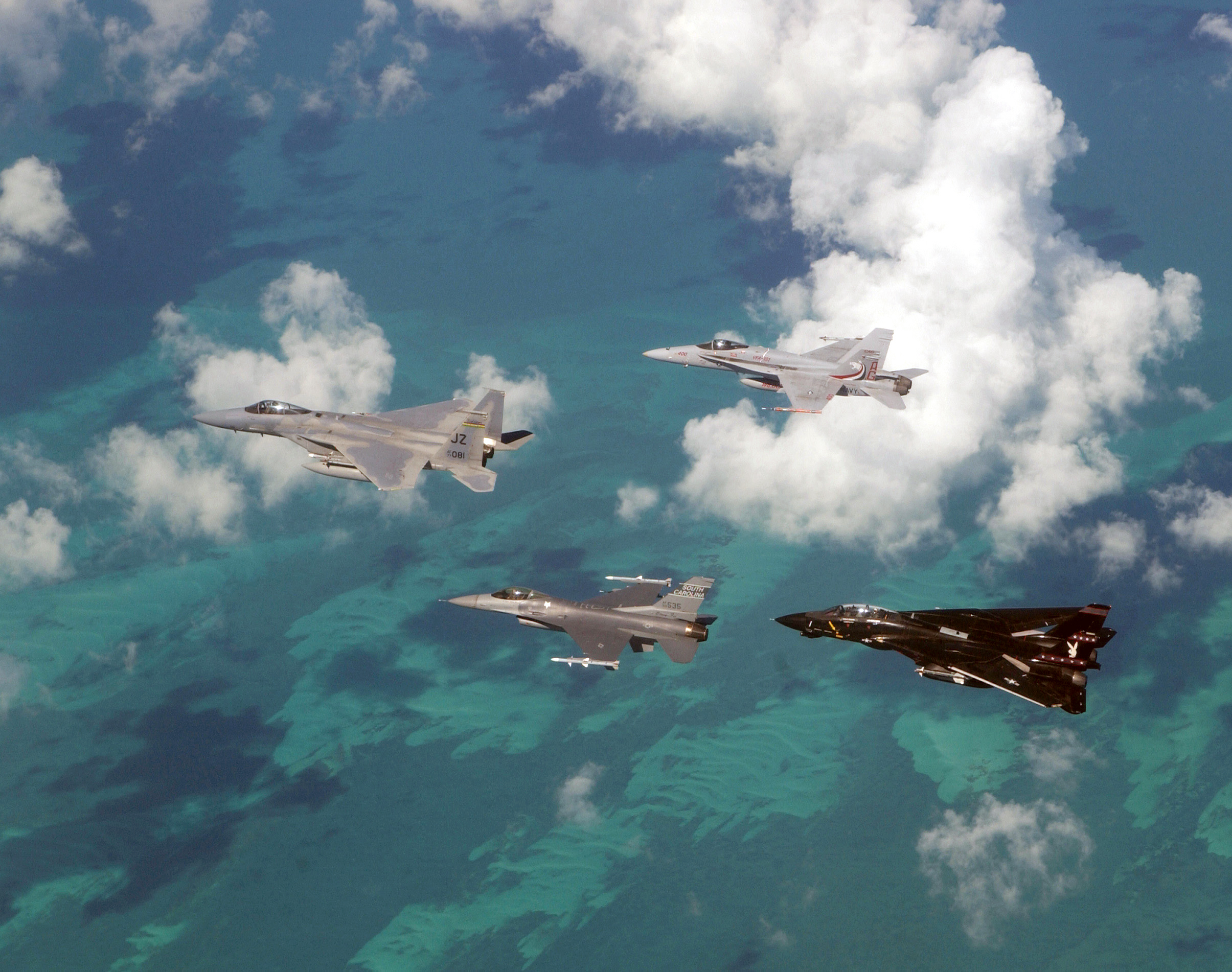
USAF F-15 and F-16 alongside F/A-18 and F-14 of USN. While the F-14 was retired early for strategic and operational reasons, the former 3 are still serving as backbone platforms serving the United States Armed Forces air forces.

Due to the dramatic enhancement of capabilities in these upgraded fighters and in new designs of the 1990s that reflected these new capabilities, they have come to be known as 4.5 generation. This is intended to reflect a class of fighters that are evolutionary upgrades of the fourth generation incorporating integrated avionics suites, advanced weapons efforts to make the (mostly) conventionally designed aircraft nonetheless less easily detectable and trackable as a response to advancing missile and radar technology (see stealth technology). Inherent airframe design features exist and include masking of turbine blades and application of advanced sometimes radar-absorbent materials, but not the distinctive low-observable configurations of the latest aircraft, referred to as fifth-generation fighters or aircraft such as the Lockheed Martin F-22 Raptor.

The United States defines 4.5-generation fighter aircraft as fourth-generation jet fighters that have been upgraded with AESA radar, high-capacity data-link, enhanced avionics, and "the ability to deploy current and reasonably foreseeable advanced armaments". Contemporary examples of 4.5-generation fighters are the Sukhoi Su-30SM/Su-34/Su-35, Shenyang J-15B/J-16, Chengdu J-10C, Mikoyan MiG-35, Eurofighter Typhoon, Dassault Rafale, Saab JAS 39E/F Gripen, Boeing F/A-18E/F Super Hornet, Lockheed Martin F-16E/F/V Block 70/72, McDonnell Douglas F-15E/EX Strike Eagle/Eagle II, HAL Tejas MK1A, CAC/PAC JF-17 Block 3, and Mitsubishi F-2. Fourth Generation have special variant for EA such as EA-18G Growler, Griphen E/EA, Eurofighter EK, Panavia Tornado ECR, KF-21 EA, and J-16D.

== Characteristics ==
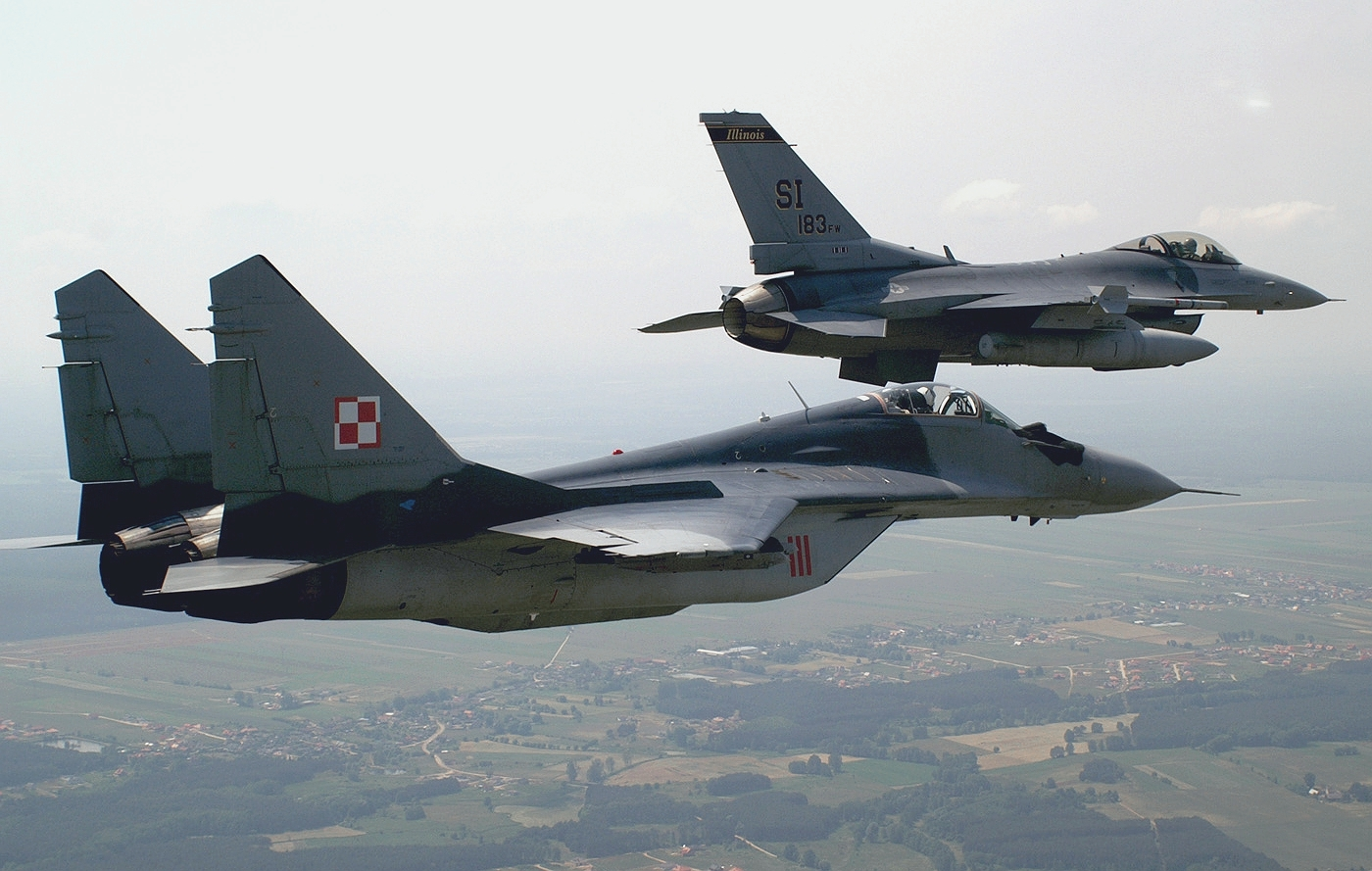
A Polish Air Force Mikoyan MiG-29 with a USAF F-16 Fighting Falcon

=== Performance ===
Whereas the premier third-generation jet fighters (e.g., the F-4 and MiG-23) were designed as interceptors with only a secondary emphasis on maneuverability, 4th generation aircraft try to reach an equilibrium, with most designs, such as the F-14 and the F-15, being able to execute beyond visual range (BVR) interceptions while remaining highly maneuverable in case the platform and the pilot find themselves in a close range dogfight. While the trade-offs involved in combat aircraft design are again shifting towards BVR engagement, the management of the advancing environment of numerous information flows in the modern battlespace, and low-observability, arguably at the expense of maneuvering ability in close combat, the application of thrust vectoring provides a way to maintain it, especially at low speed.

Key advances contributing to enhanced maneuverability in the fourth generation include high engine thrust, powerful control surfaces, and relaxed static stability (RSS), this last enabled via "fly-by-wire" computer-controlled stability augmentation. Air combat manoeuvring also involves a great deal of energy management to maintain speed and altitude under rapidly changing flight conditions.

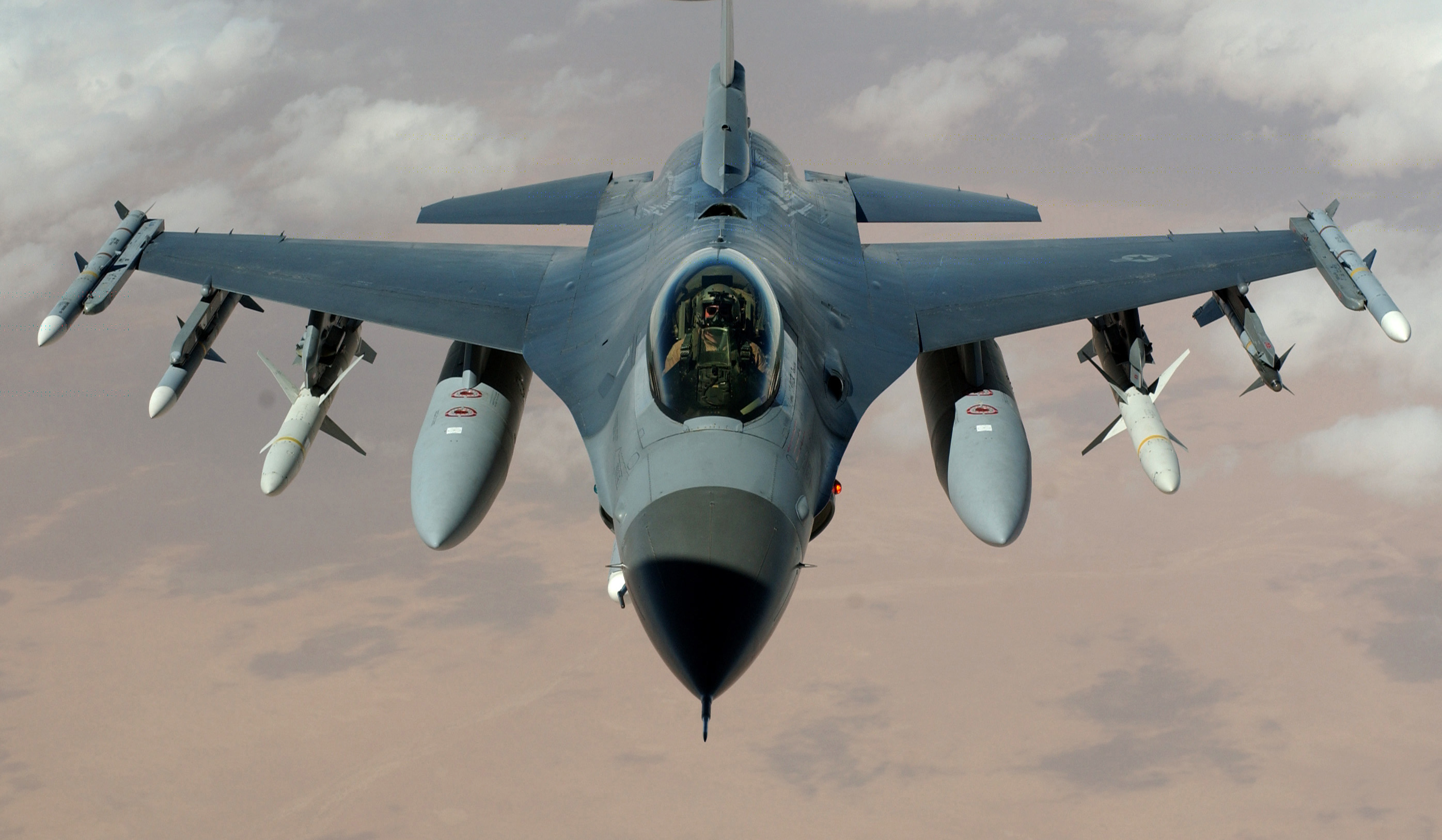
A USAF F-16 on a mission near Iraq in 2003

=== Fly-by-wire ===
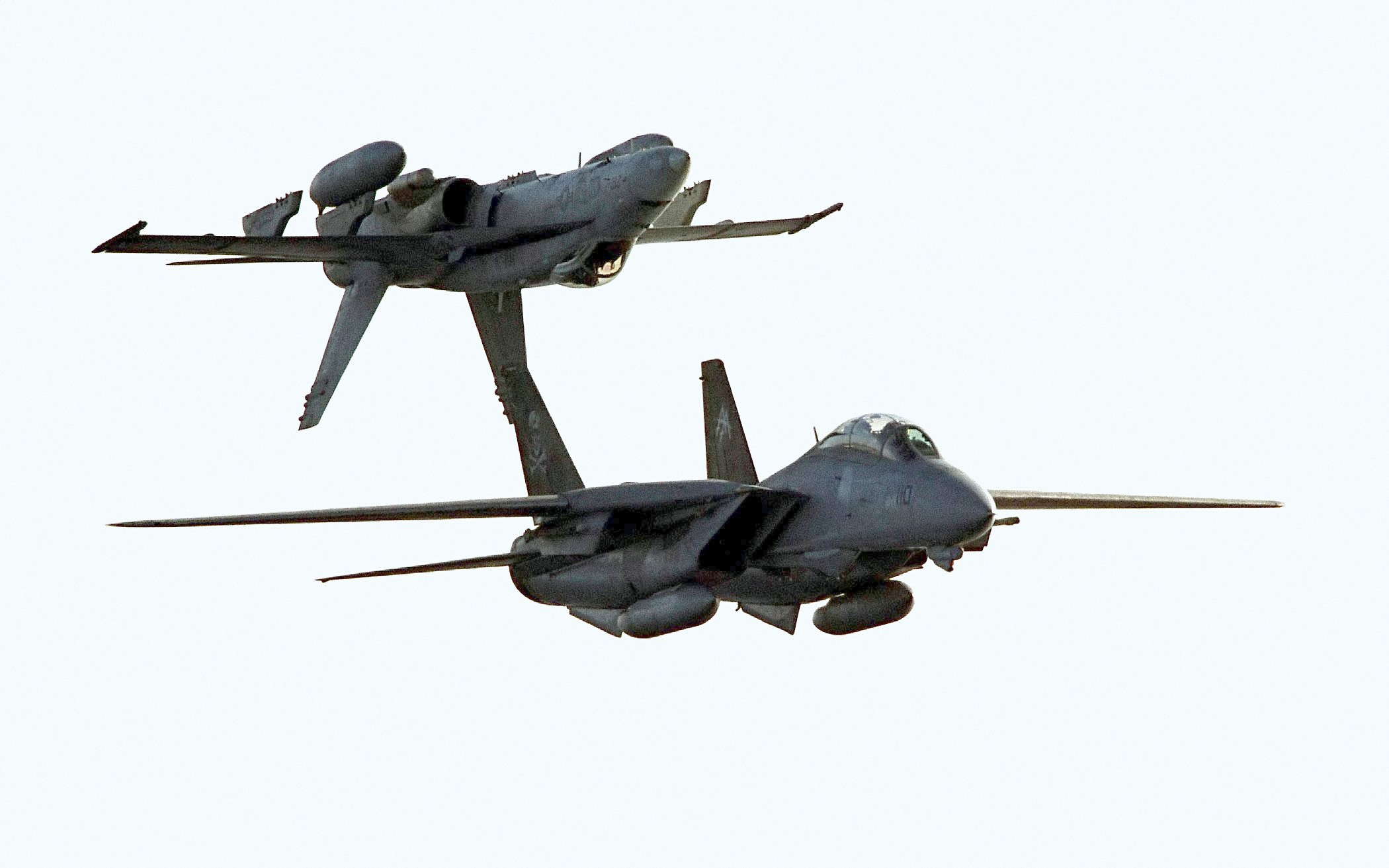
The F/A-18 inverted above an F-14 shown here is an example of fly-by-wire control.

Fly-by-wire is a term used to describe the computerized automation of flight control surfaces. Early fourth-generation fighters like the F-15 Eagle and F-14 Tomcat retained electromechanical flight hydraulics. Later fourth-generation fighters would make extensive use of fly-by-wire technology.

The General Dynamics YF-16, eventually developed into the F-16 Fighting Falcon, was the world's first aircraft intentionally designed to be slightly aerodynamically unstable. This technique, called relaxed static stability (RSS), was incorporated to further enhance the aircraft's performance. Most aircraft are designed with positive static stability, which induces an aircraft to return to its original attitude following a disturbance. However, positive static stability, the tendency to remain in its current attitude, opposes the pilot's efforts to maneuver. An aircraft with negative static stability, though, in the absence of control input, will readily deviate from level and controlled flight. An unstable aircraft can therefore be made more maneuverable. Such a 4th generation aircraft requires a computerized FBW flight control system (FLCS) to maintain its desired flight path.

Some late derivatives of the early types, such as the F-15SA Strike Eagle for Saudi Arabia, have included upgrading to FBW.

=== Thrust vectoring ===
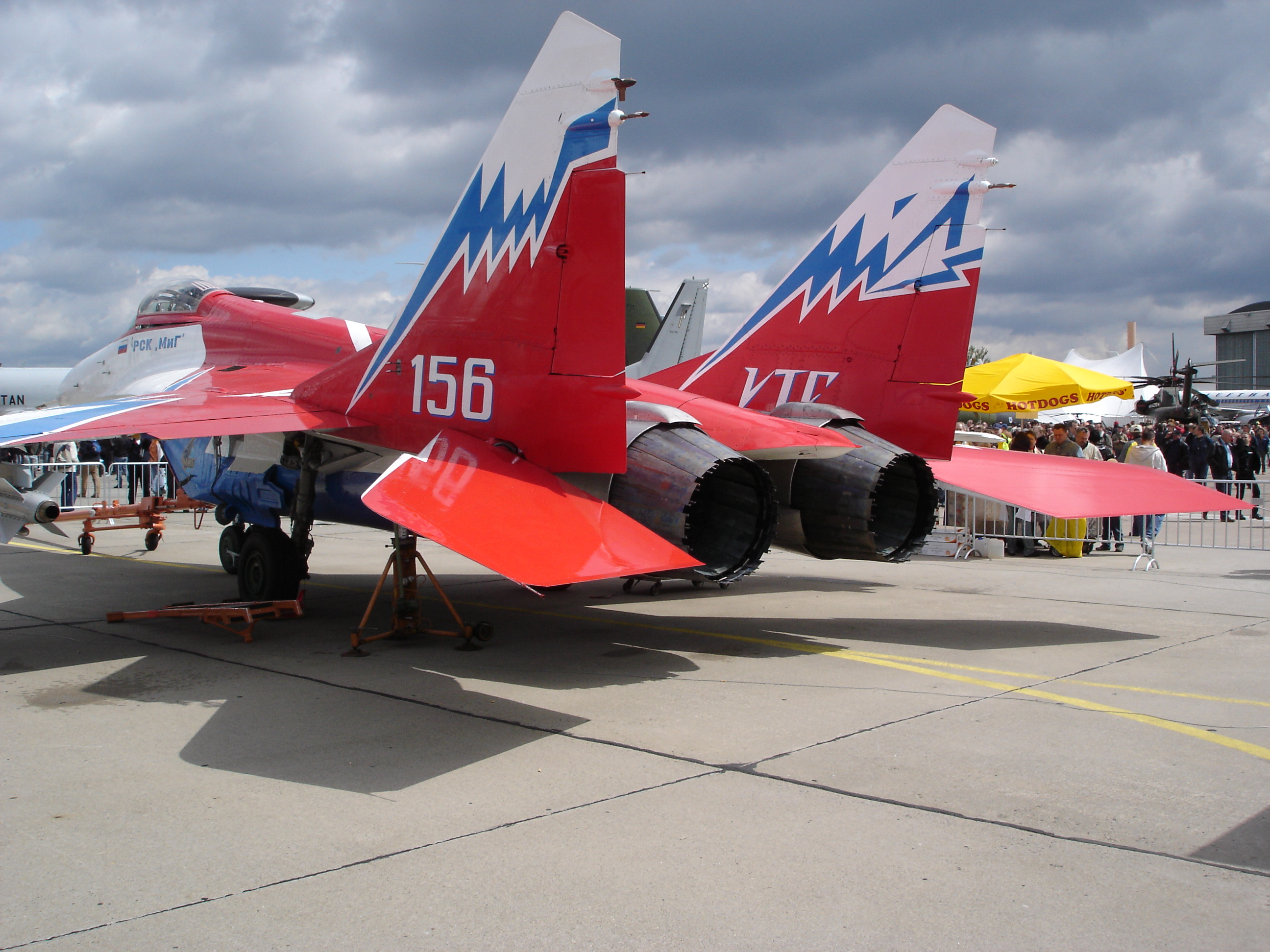
MiG-29OVT all-aspect thrust vectoring engine view

Thrust vectoring was originally introduced in the Hawker Siddeley Harrier for vertical takeoff and landing, and pilots soon developed the technique of "viffing", or vectoring in forward flight, to enhance manoeuvrability. The first fixed-wing type to display enhanced manoeuvrability in this way was the Sukhoi Su-27, the first aircraft to publicly display thrust vectoring in pitch. Combined with a thrust-to-weight ratio above unity, this enabled it to maintain near-zero airspeed at high angles of attack without stalling, and perform novel aerobatics such as Pugachev's Cobra. The three-dimensional TVC nozzles of the Sukhoi Su-30MKI are mounted 32° outward to the longitudinal engine axis (i.e. in the horizontal plane) and can be deflected ±15° in the vertical plane. This produces a corkscrew effect, further enhancing the turning capability of the aircraft. The MiG-35 with its RD-33OVT engines with the vectored thrust nozzles allows it to be the first twin-engined aircraft with vectoring nozzles that can move in two directions (that is, 3D TVC). Other existing thrust-vectoring aircraft, like the F-22, have nozzles that vector in one direction. The technology has been fitted to the Sukhoi Su-47 Berkut and later derivatives. The U.S. explored fitting the technology to the F-16 and the F-15, but did not introduce it until the fifth generation arrived.

=== Supercruise ===
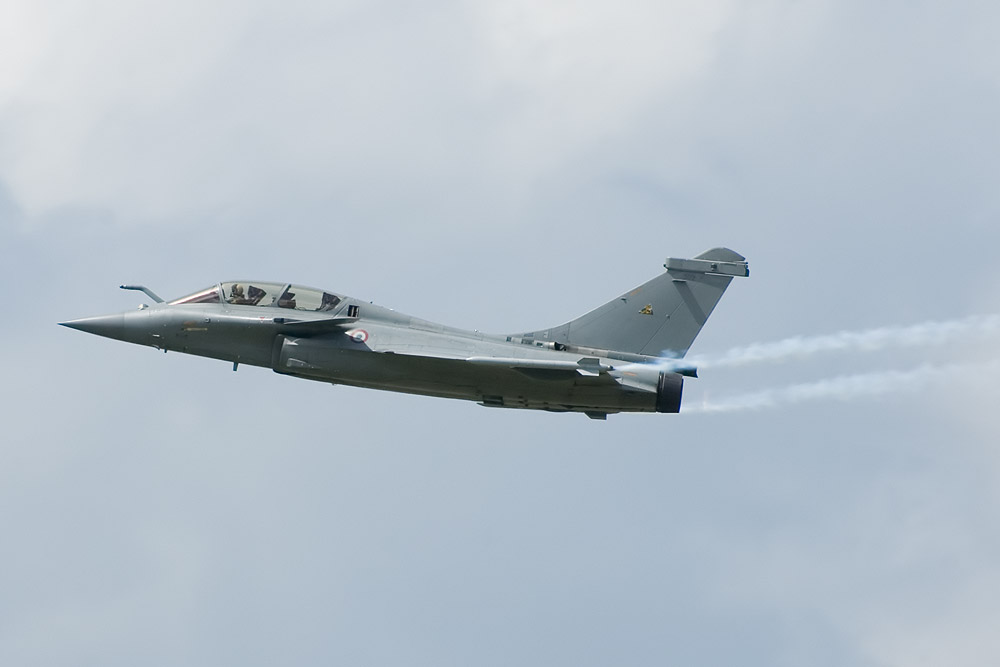
The Dassault Rafale, which features supercruise

Supercruise is the ability of a jet aircraft to cruise at supersonic speeds without using an afterburner.

Maintaining supersonic speed without afterburner use saves large quantities of fuel, greatly increasing range and endurance, but the engine power available is limited and drag rises sharply in the transonic region, so drag-creating equipment such as external stores and their attachment points must be minimised, preferably with the use of internal storage.

The Eurofighter Typhoon can cruise around Mach 1.2 without afterburner; its maximum level speed without reheat is Mach 1.5. An EF T1 DA (Development Aircraft trainer version) demonstrated supercruise (1.21 M) with 2 SRAAM, 4 MRAAM and drop tank (plus 1-tonne flight-test equipment, plus 700 kg more weight for the trainer version) during the Singapore evaluation.

=== Avionics ===
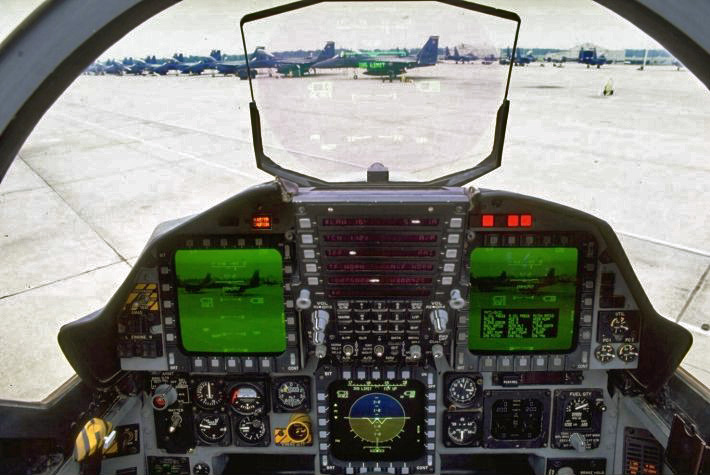
A USAF F-15E cockpit

Avionics can often be swapped out as new technologies become available; they are often upgraded over the lifetime of an aircraft. For example, the F-15C Eagle, first produced in 1978, has received upgrades in 2007 such as AESA radar and joint helmet-mounted cueing system, and is scheduled to receive a 2040C upgrade to keep it in service until 2040.

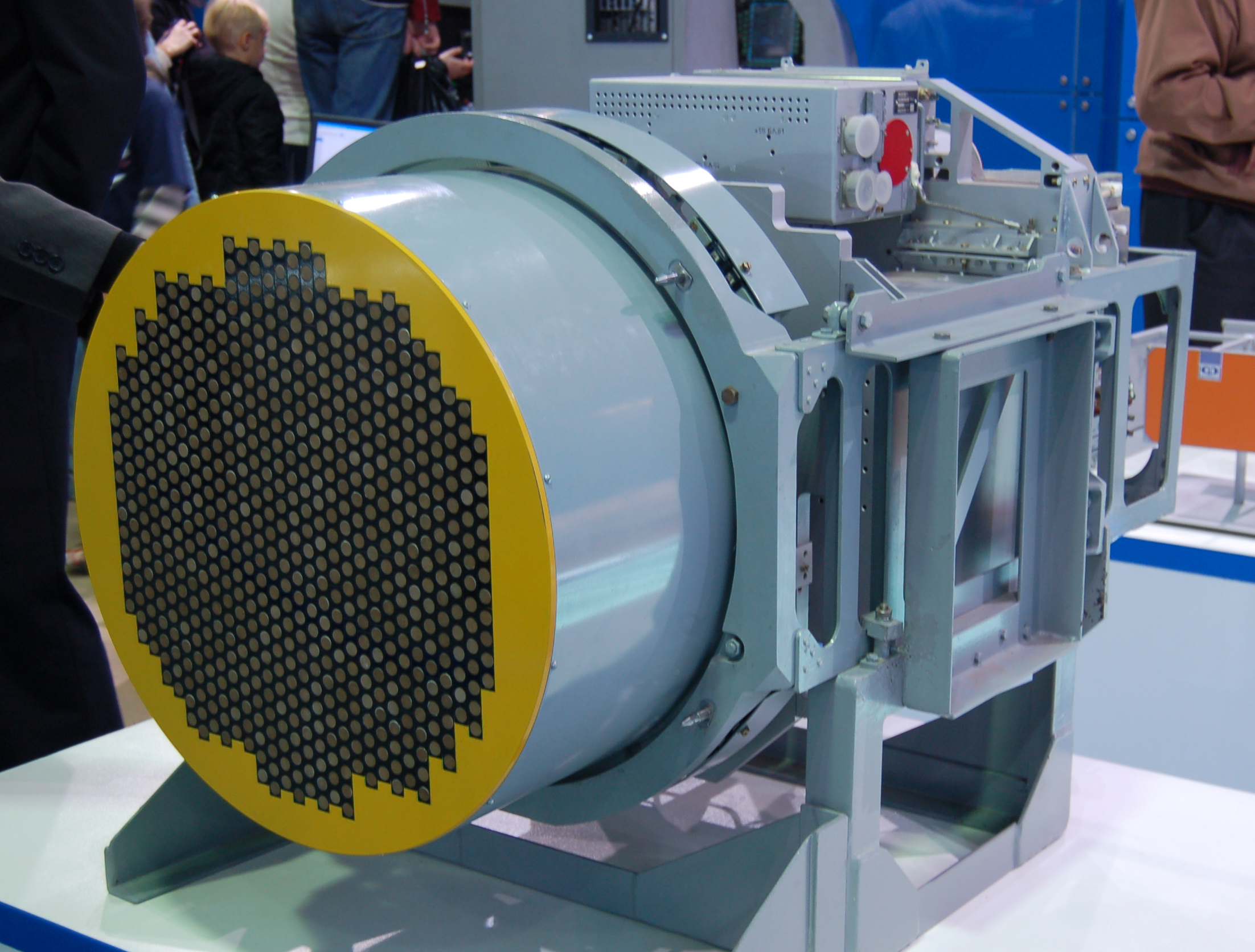
Zhuk-AE active electronically scanned array radar

The primary sensor for all modern fighters is radar. The U.S. fielded its first modified F-15Cs equipped with AN/APG-63(V)2 AESA radars, which have no moving parts and are capable of projecting a much tighter beam and quicker scans. Later on, it was introduced to the F/A-18E/F Super Hornet and the block 60 (export) F-16 also, and will be used for future American fighters. France introduced its first indigenous AESA radar, the RBE2-AESA built by Thales in February 2012 for use on the Rafale. The RBE2-AESA can also be retrofitted on the Mirage 2000. A European consortium GTDAR is developing an AESA Euroradar CAPTOR radar for future use on the Typhoon. For the next-generation F-22 and F-35, the U.S. will use low probability of intercept capacity. This will spread the energy of a radar pulse over several frequencies, so as not to trip the radar warning receivers that all aircraft carry.

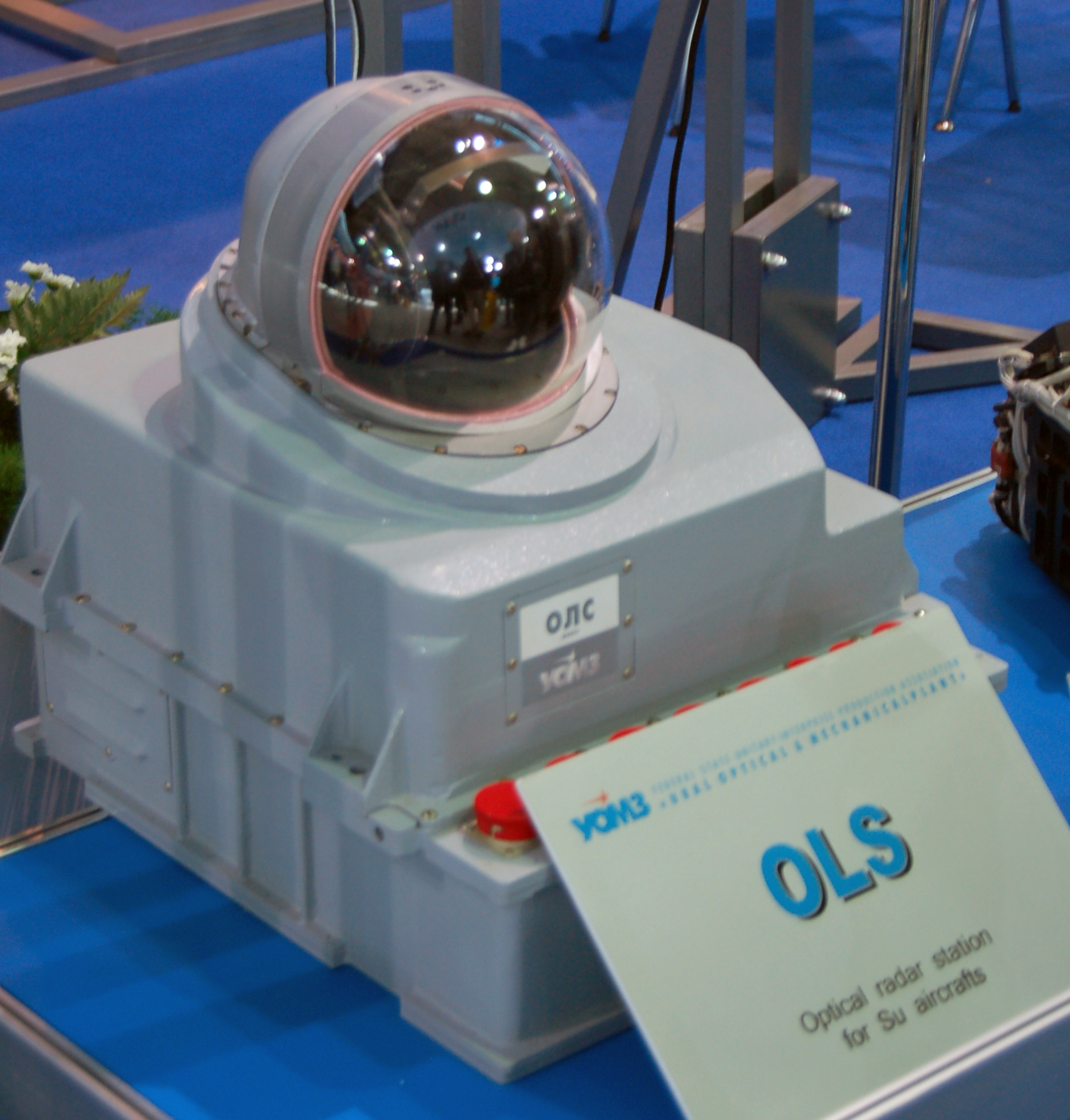
The OLS-30 is a combined IRST/laser rangefinder device.

In response to the increasing American emphasis on radar-evading stealth designs, Russia turned to alternate sensors, with emphasis on Infrared Search and Track (IRST) sensors, first introduced on the American F-101 Voodoo and F-102 Delta Dagger fighters in the 1960s, for detection and tracking of airborne targets. These measure IR radiation from targets. As a passive sensor, it has limited range, and contains no inherent data about position and direction of targets—these must be inferred from the images captured. To offset this, IRST systems can incorporate a laser rangefinder in order to provide full fire-control solutions for cannon fire or for launching missiles. Using this method, German MiG-29 using helmet-displayed IRST systems were able to acquire a missile lock with greater efficiency than USAF F-16 in wargame exercises. IRST sensors have now become standard on Russian aircraft.

A computing feature of significant tactical importance is the datalink. All modern European and American aircraft are capable of sharing targeting data with allied fighters and AWACS planes (see JTIDS). The Russian MiG-31 interceptor also has some datalink capability. The sharing of targeting and sensor data allows pilots to put radiating, highly visible sensors further from enemy forces, while using those data to vector silent fighters toward the enemy.

=== Stealth ===
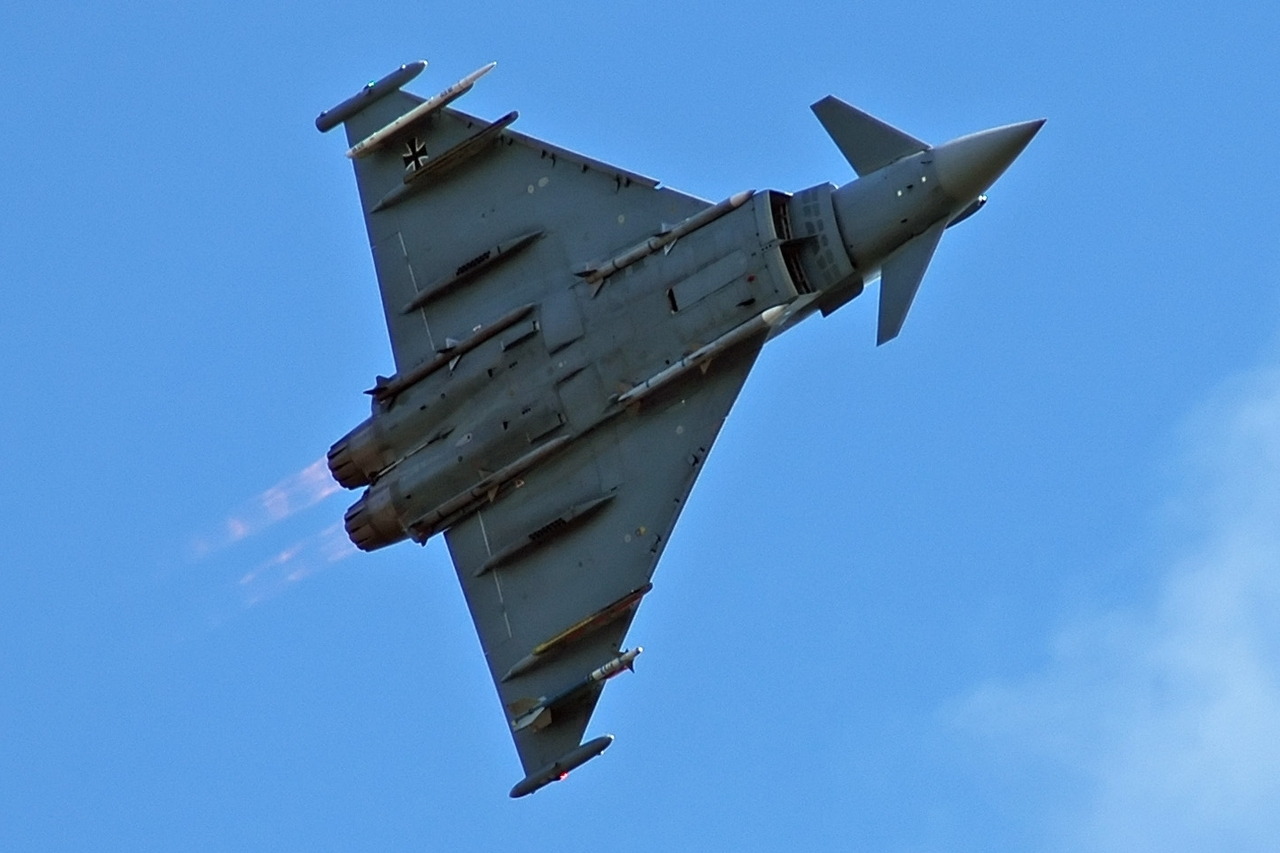
The Eurofighter Typhoon uses jet intakes that conceal the front of the jet engine (a strong radar target) from radar. Many important radar targets, such as the wing, canard, and fin leading edges, are highly swept to reflect radar energy well away from the front sector.

While the basic principles of shaping aircraft to avoid radar detection were known since the 1960s, the advent of radar-absorbent materials allowed aircraft of drastically reduced radar cross-section to become practicable. During the 1970s, early stealth technology led to the faceted airframe of the Lockheed F-117 Nighthawk ground-attack aircraft. The faceting reflected radar beams highly directionally, leading to brief "twinkles", which detector systems of the day typically registered as noise, but even with digital FBW stability and control enhancement, the aerodynamic performance penalties were severe and the F-117 found use principally in the night ground-attack role. Stealth technologies also seek to decrease the infrared signature, visual signature, and acoustic signature of the aircraft.

In the modern-day, the KF-21 Boramae, though not considered a 5th-gen fighter, has much more significant stealth than other 4th gen fighters.

== 4.5 generation ==
The term 4.5 generation is often used to refer to new or enhanced fighters, which appeared beginning in the 1990s, and incorporated some features regarded as fifth generation, but lacked others. The 4.5-generation fighters are therefore generally less expensive, less complex, and have a shorter development time than true fifth-generation aircraft, while maintaining capabilities significantly in advance of those of the original fourth generation. Such capabilities may include advanced sensor integration, AESA radar, supercruise capability, supermaneuverability, broad multi-role capability, and reduced radar cross-section.

The 4.5-generation fighters have introduced integrated IRST systems, such as the Dassault Rafale featuring the optronique secteur frontal integrated IRST. The Eurofighter Typhoon introduced the PIRATE-IRST, which was also retrofitted to earlier production models. The Super Hornet was also fitted with IRST. although not integrated but rather as a pod that needs to be attached on one of the hardpoints.

As advances in stealthy materials and design methods enabled smoother airframes, such technologies began to be retrospectively applied to existing fighter aircraft. Many 4.5 generation fighters incorporate some low-observable features. Low-observable radar technology emerged as an important development. The Pakistani / Chinese JF-17 and China's Chengdu J-10B/C use a diverterless supersonic inlet, while India's HAL Tejas uses carbon-fiber composite in manufacturing. The IAI Lavi used an S-duct air intake to prevent radar waves from reflecting off the engine compressor blades, an important aspect of fifth-generation fighter aircraft to reduce frontal RCS. These are a few of the preferred methods employed in some fifth-generation fighters to reduce RCS.

KAI KF-21 Boramae is a joint South Korean-Indonesian fighter program, the functionality of the Block 1 model (the first flight test prototype) has been described as ‘4.5th generation’. Rafale F-5 "Super Rafale" is 4.5 generation with capabilities though similar to F-35 in loyal wingman UAV/UCAV concept and in Aircraft carrier ship capabilities same as F/A 18 Super Hornet then add pod ECM at external pod.

== See also ==
- Jet fighter generations
- List of fighter aircraft
