= 2024 Tabas coal mine explosion =

Methane-caused coal mine explosion in Iran

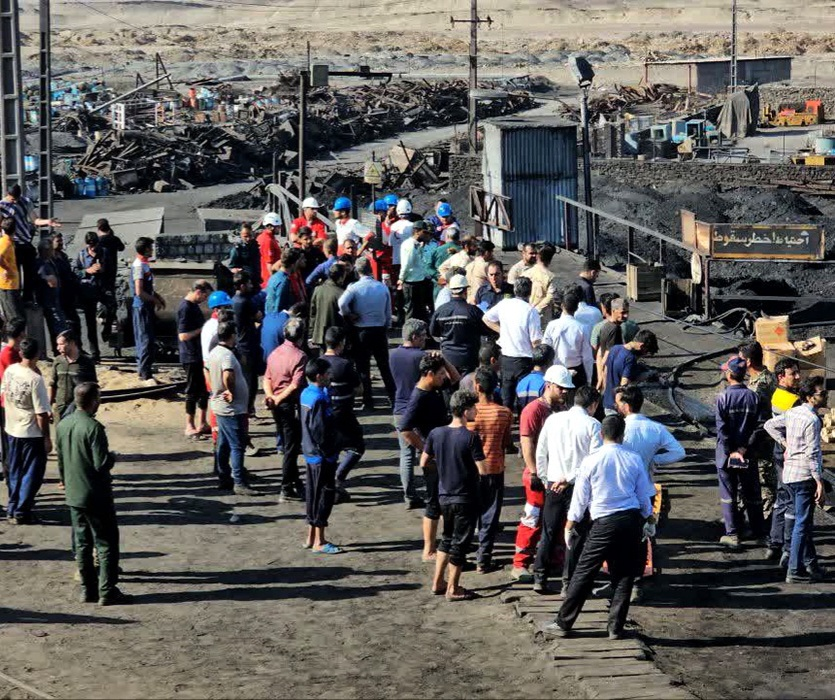
- The entrance of the tunnel
- Date: September 21, 2024
- Time: 21:00 (IRST)
- Location: Tabas, South Khorasan Province, Iran; 32.9850129°N 56.8579884°E
- Type: Coal mine explosion
- Cause: Methane
- Deaths: 51
- Injuries: 20

On September 21, 2024, an explosion occurred at a coal mine in Tabas, South Khorasan Province, Iran. The incident killed at least 51 people and injured 20 more.

== Background ==
The Tabas Parvadeh 5 mine was owned and operated by Madanjoo Company. It occupies a 30,000 km^{2} (12,000 sq mi) area with reserves of coal thought to be one of the largest in the country. Eastern Iran accounts for 76 percent of the nation's coal production. The coal industry in the area is dominated by at least eight large corporations including Mandanjoo. Deaths from mining disasters in the country are commonly attributed to poor safety measurements and lack of emergency capabilities. In 2017, 42 people died in a similar explosion.

== Explosion ==
The mine, located in Tabas, some 540 km (340 mi) from Tehran, exploded at 21:00 local time while 69 workers were inside. The Islamic Republic News Agency (IRNA) reported 51 fatalities and 20 injured. Twenty-two people were trapped in the mine.

The explosion occurred at a depth of 250 m (820 ft). According to IRNA, the explosion occurred after a methane gas leak. Twenty-eight people who evacuated the mine were hospitalized.

All of the workers were either at blocks B or C of the mine during the explosion. During the initial rescue, large amounts of methane gas were discharged within both blocks. The emission rate was greater in Block B, where rescuers were unable to enter. Forty-seven workers were in Block B and 22 were in Block C during the explosion.

== Response ==
President Masoud Pezeshkian instructed rescue and recovery efforts to assist the affected. Over 100 rescue personnel, including 40 specialized mine rescuers, were dispatched to the scene. Thirteen ambulances also carried casualties to nearby medical facilities. Some survivors were airlifted from the mine. Tabas city officials and the labor ministry said that the methane discharge at the mine hampered relief works. Bodies of the dead were transferred away from the mine on carts.

Pezeshkian said an inquiry into the explosion had opened. The ministers of labor and industry, mining, and trade were ordered by the president to visit South Khorasan for the inquiry process. On 24 September, Zahra Saeedi, a member of the Islamic Consultative Assembly's committee on mining said that the mine's safety system was not working and that the central alarm system was either broken or non-existent.

== Reactions ==
- Ali Khamenei, Supreme Leader of Iran: "I offer my condolences to the people of Tabas and the families of those affected by the tragic, heartbreaking tragedy in a coal mine in which a number of workers were either killed or injured. I urge the rescue teams dispatched by government officials to assist at the site of the tragedy to make every effort to rescue those who are still trapped and to take all necessary measures to minimize the extent of this tragedy. Furthermore, immediate medical care must be provided to the injured."

== See also ==
- Yal Shomal Coal Mine Incident
- Bab Nizou Mine Explosion
