= Minaret Kabir =

Religion
- Province: South Khorasan
- Status: demolished

Location
- Location: South Khorasan, Iran
- Municipality: Tabas
- Territory: Tabas

Architecture
- Type: Minaret
- Minaret height: 40 m (130 ft)
- Designated as NHL

Iran National Heritage List
- Official name: Kabir Minaret
- Type: Minaret
- Designated: 1935
- Reference no.: 245
- Conservation organization: Cultural Heritage, Handicrafts and Tourism Organization of Iran

Minaret Kabir (Menār-e Kabir) was an eleventh century brick minaret, located in Tabas (a desert city in central Iran), constructed during the Seljuk Empire.

The minaret was one of the earliest recorded man-made structures in Tabas, constructed between 993 and 1014 (during the late Ghaznavid-early Seljuk period). It was estimated to be approximately 40 m (130 ft) high.

It collapsed on 22 February 1907, due to the construction of the Kariz-e Allahabad, a qanat, which weakened the minaret's foundations.

The minaret was recorded as one of Iran's National Heritage on 7 December 1935 (Archeological Department Registration No. 245).

The remnants of the minaret were removed in the 1960s and bricks from it have been found in the walls of surrounding houses.

== See also ==
- Cultural Heritage, Handicrafts and Tourism Organization of Iran
- Seljuq dynasty
