= Golshan Garden =

Historic garden in Tabas, Iran

- باغ گلشن (طبس)
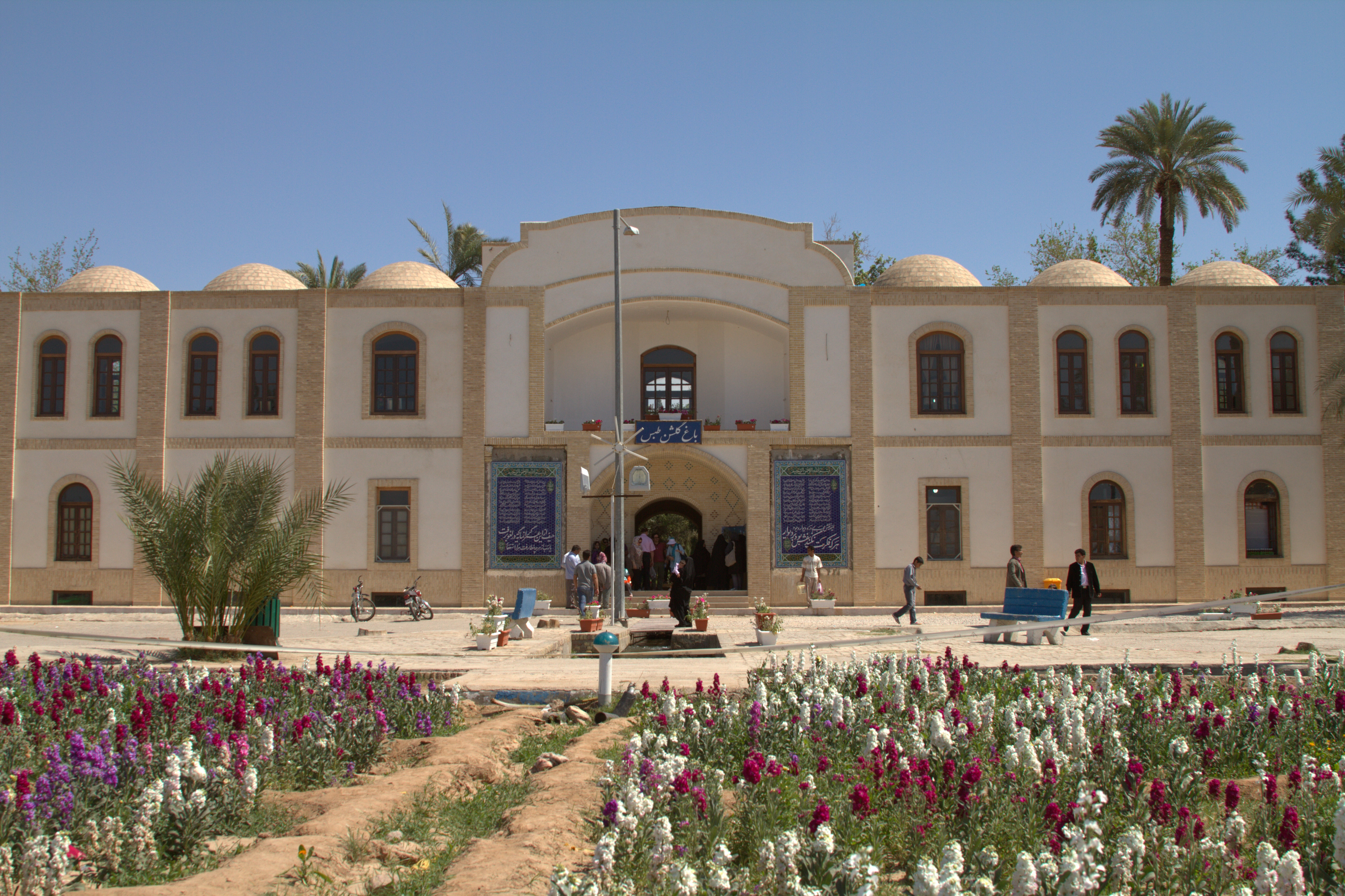
- The Golshan Garden
- Established: 1977
- Location: Tabas, Iran
- Coordinates: 33°36′05″N 56°56′38″E
- Type: Persian Garden
- Owner: Iranian Army

Golshan Garden (Persian: باغ گلشن) is in the town of Tabas. The garden, which is currently a public park, has an area of 8 hectares.

This garden where has been developed in compliance to Iranian garden architecture.

At center point of this garden, there is a pond that is the habitat of two pelicans that are named in the Mir Hassan Khan Trust as beneficiaries, and these birds are very familiar with visitors.

== History ==
The age of this garden dates back to Zand and Qajar eras. In 1979, the last owner, Mir Massoum Khan Sheibany, father to Amir Ali Sheibany, was removed as the Trustee by the new revolutionary government.

== See also ==
- Persian garden
- Persian architecture
- Gardens of Persia Hardcover – February 17, 2004
- Daily Telegraph - 50 most beautiful gardens in the World
