= Yal Shomal coal mine explosion =

Mining explosion in Iran

Yal Shomal Coal Mine Incident
- Date: 18 December 2012
- Time: 7:30 AM (local time)
- Location: Tabas, South Khorasan, Iran
- Type: Mining accident
- Cause: Methane gas accumulation and explosion
- Deaths: 8

The Yal Shomal Coal Mine explosion occurred on December 18, 2012 at the Yal Shomal coal mine located 25 kilometers from the city of Tabas. This incident, caused by the accumulation and explosion of methane gas, resulted in the deaths of 8 people.

== Cause of the incident ==
The Yal Shomal coal mine incident in Tabas, which resulted in the death of eight workers, was caused by the accumulation of methane gas and poor ventilation, according to expert investigations. Methane gas accumulated in the mine's "Ofoq Se" section and, due to improper ventilation, reached explosive levels at the end of a drift. The mixture of this gas with oxygen eventually ignited by a spark, causing the explosion.

The incident also occurred due to the improper implementation of safety protocols. The mine's safety officer was responsible for conducting gas measurements before the workers' shift and ensuring that the methane gas level was below the standard limit before allowing workers to enter. However, it seems this procedure was not properly carried out, leading to the incident.
