= Tabas-e Masina =

City in South Khorasan province, Iran

Tabas-e Masina Persian: طبس مسينا
- City
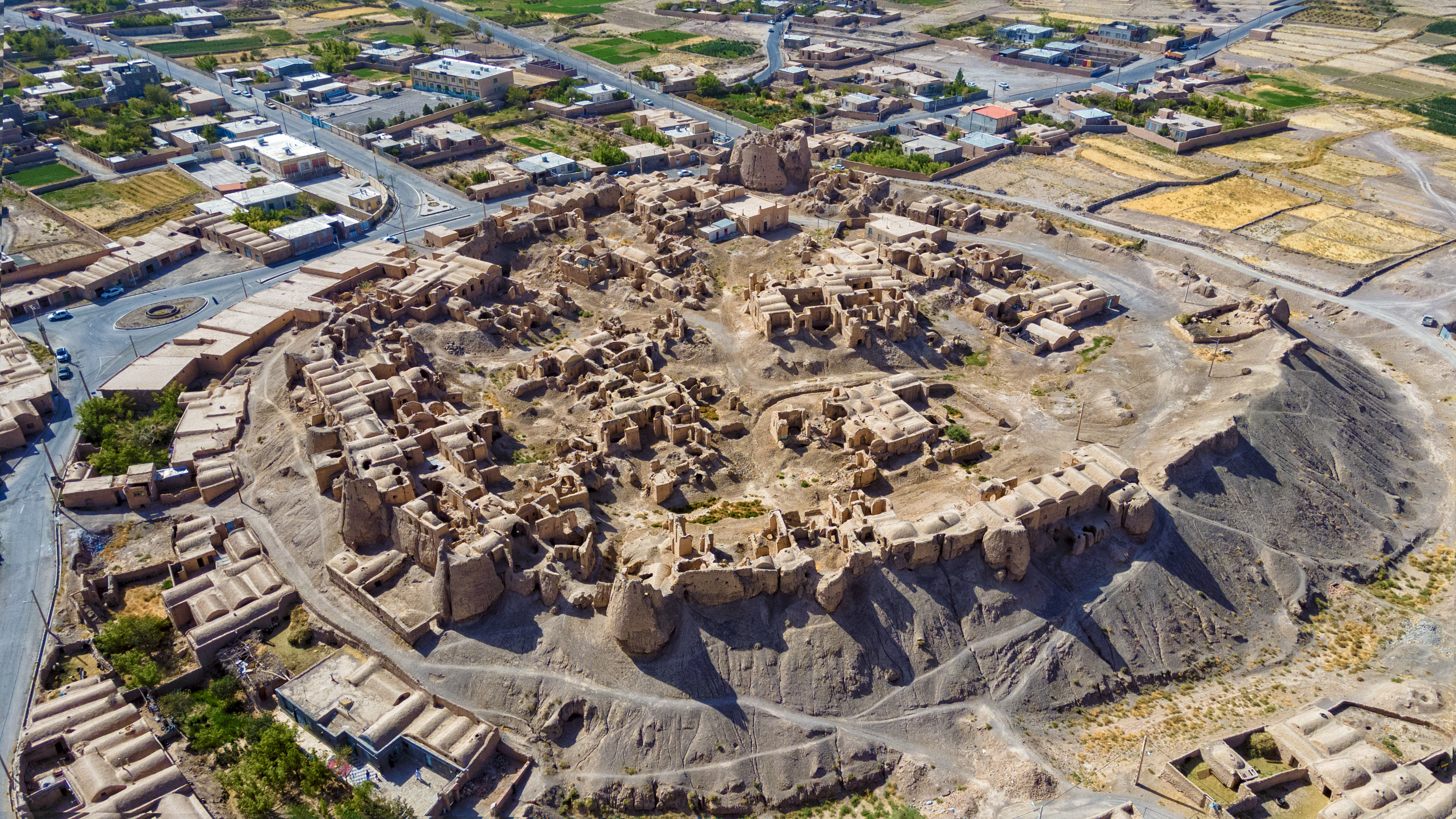
- Tabas-e Mesina Castle in 2023

- Location within Iran
- Coordinates: 32°48′28″N 60°13′17″E
- Country: Iran
- Province: South Khorasan
- County: Darmian
- District: Gazik
- Established: 2008

Population (2016)
  - Total: 4,596
- Time zone: UTC+3:30 (IRST)

Tabas-e Masina (Persian: طبس مسينا) (Note: Also romanized as Ţabas Masīnā and Ţabas-e Masīnā; also known as Ţabas and Masīnā) is a city in Gazik District of Darmian County, South Khorasan province, Iran, serving as the administrative center for Tabas-e Masina Rural District.

== History ==
In the Middle Ages, the town was known as Tabas al-Unnab ('Tabas of the Jujube') to distinguish it from the nearby Tabas al-Tamr ('Tabas of the Dates'); together the two towns gave their name to the district of Tabasayn. In the 10th century, Ibn Hawqal described it as a middling town of clay bricks, but with ruined fortifications and no castle; while Qazvini in the 13th century mentions a castle in the nearby village of Iravah. Medieval geographers noted the relatively abundant water supply of the town, in marked contrast to the surrounding countryside. In the 19th century, the town was inhabited almost entirely by Afghan Sunnis, whence it was also known as Sunni-Khanah.

The city contains a castle dating back to the Parthian Empire.

== Demographics ==
=== Population ===
At the time of the 2006 National Census, Tabas-e Masina's population was 3,776 in 779 households, when it was a village in Tabas-e Masina Rural District. The following census in 2011 counted 4,133 people in 979 households, by which time the village had been converted to a city. The 2016 census measured the population of the city as 4,596 people in 1,072 households.
