= RBE2 =

Type of radar system

RBE2 Radar
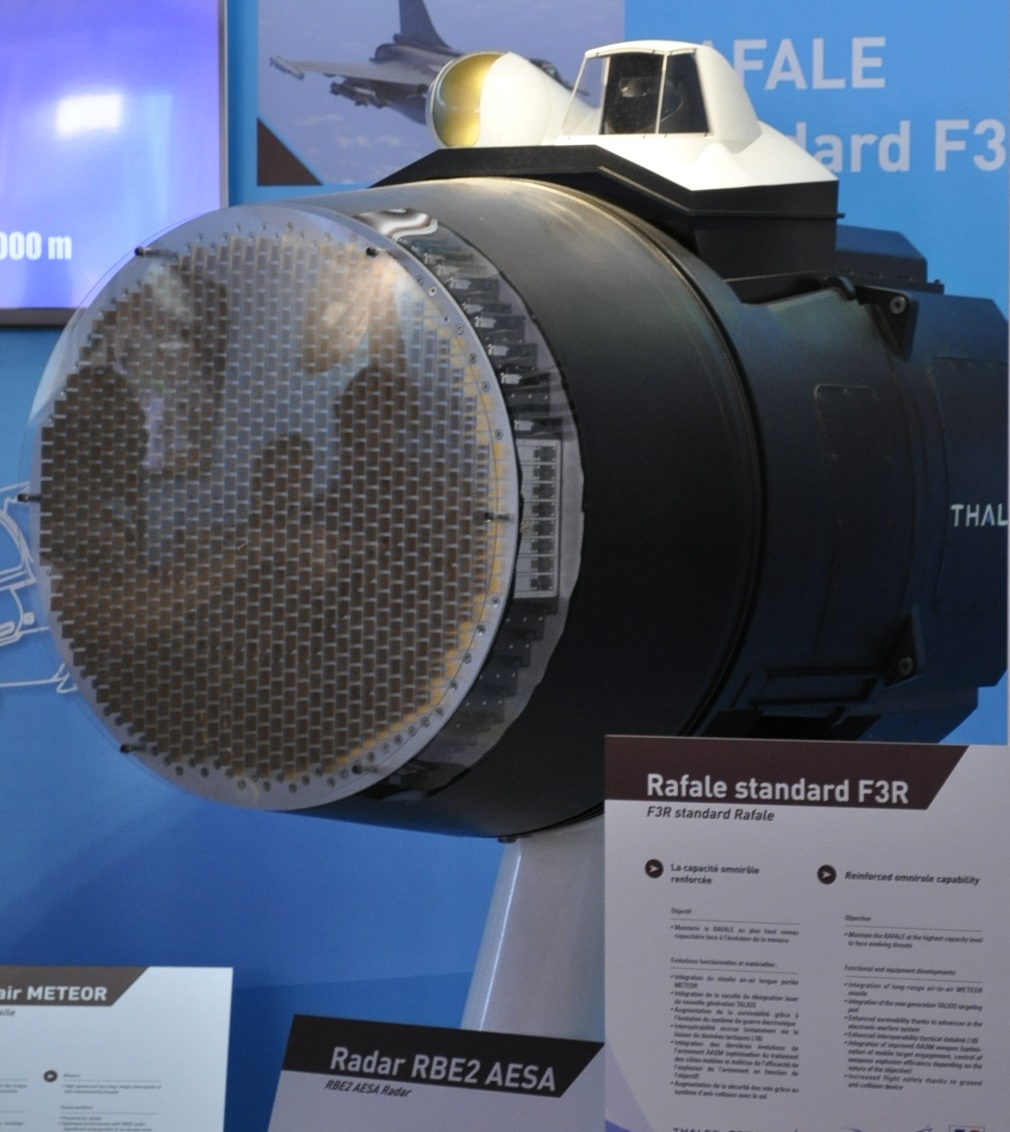
- RBE2-AA AESA
- Country of origin: France
- Manufacturer: Thales Group
- Designer: Thomson-CSF; Dassault Électronique
- Introduced: RBE2: 2000; RBE2-AA: 2012
- Type: RBE2: PESA; RBE2-AA: GaAs AESA; RBE2-XG: GaN AESA
- Frequency: X-band

The RBE2 (Radar à Balayage Electronique 2 plans) is a multirole radar developed during the 1990s for the Dassault Rafale, a French combat aircraft. The original RBE2 is a passive electronically scanned array. This has since been developed into the RBE2-AA, an active electronically scanned array.

== Development ==
=== RBE2 ===
Development of the RBE2 began in 1989 as a joint project between Thomson-CSF's RCM division and Dassault Electronique which merged in 1998 to form Thomson-CSF Detexis. Development was continued by Thomson-CSF's successor company, Thales Group.

The RBE2 is a passive electronically scanned array (PESA), an electronically scanned radar with a single transmitter. Flight trials of the RBE2 began in 1992 and the first production radar was delivered in May 1997.

=== RBE2-AA ===
In April 2002, the French defence procurement agency, Délégation Générale pour l'Armement (DGA), awarded Thales Group a contract to develop an active electronically scanned array (AESA) radar demonstrator based on the RBE2 radar. The resulting RBE2-AA (active array) variant has been tested on a Mirage 2000 testbed aircraft from the Flight Test Center of the DGA and then on a Rafale. While the first tests were made with American transmitter-receivers, the current radar features parts manufactured by Thales. The radar uses about 838 GaAs T/R modules.

In July 2004, DGA awarded a 90 million-euro contract for the development of a second a AESA radar demonstrator. Production of the RBE2-AA commenced in 2008 and entered service in 2013.

On 15 December 2025, India-based SFO Technologies received a contract to supply complex wired structures for the RBE2 AESA radar for the Rafales ordered by the Indian Navy.

=== RBE2-XG ===
The next phase of evolution for the RBE2-AA is the RBE2-XG. Being developed by Thales, it is a GaN AESA radar which reportedly offers upto 30% increased range over its predecessor. Additionally, it has a better processing capability against multiple simultaneous tracks, along with a greater resistance to jamming and active decoys.

As of 2025, the programme is reportedly running on a delay of 8 years and would only be available for integration by 2027.

== See also ==
- Optronique secteur frontal (OSF)
- Euroradar CAPTOR
