= Tabas-e Mesina Castle =

Castle and National Heritage site in Iran

Coordinates: 32.8073°N 60.2317°E

- قلعه طبس مسینا
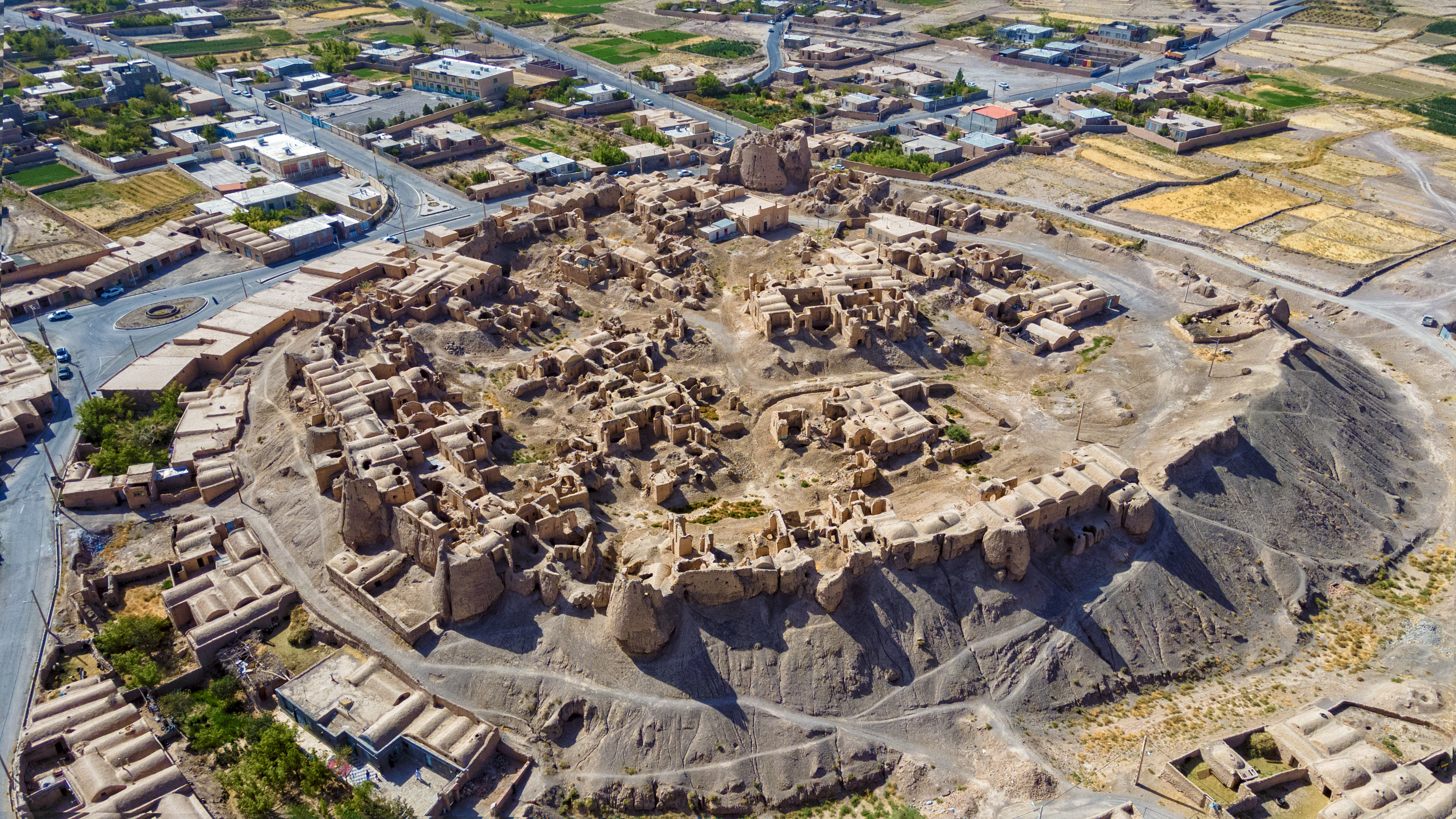
- Tabas-e Mesina Castle in 2023
- Interactive map of Tabas-e Mesina Castle

General information
- Location: Tabas-e Masina, Iran

Tabas-e Mesina Castle (Persian: قلعه طبس مسینا) is a historic castle in Tabas-e Masina, Iran. It is speculated to have been built by the Parthian Empire due to its circular design and the abundance of ancient mounds in its vicinity dating back to that era. A mosque was later added to the castle during the Qajar era.

It was listed among the national heritage sites of Iran with the number 8281 on 13 April 2003.
