= Tabasayn =

Tabasayn (lit. 'the two Tabas') was a district in Quhistan in the medieval period. The name, although referring to both cities, was often applied by geographers to either one in isolation. The cities were Tabas al-Tamr ('Tabas of the Dates'), also known as Tabas Gilaki after a famous governor of the city who had pacified the region, and Tabas al-Unnab ('Tabas of the Jujube') or Tabas Masinan. Alternatively, the term might refer to Tabas al-Tamr and the nearby village of Kuri or Kurin, which was fortified and is called "one of the two fortresses of Taban" by the 9th-century geographer al-Baladhuri.

The district was strategically important, being located immediately east of the Great Salt Desert; Tabas al-Tamr was called the 'Gate of Khurasan' by al-Baladhuri.

== Sources ==
- Le Strange, Guy (1905). The Lands of the Eastern Caliphate: Mesopotamia, Persia, and Central Asia, from the Moslem Conquest to the Time of Timur. Cambridge: Cambridge University Press.
