= Bab Nizou Mine Explosion =

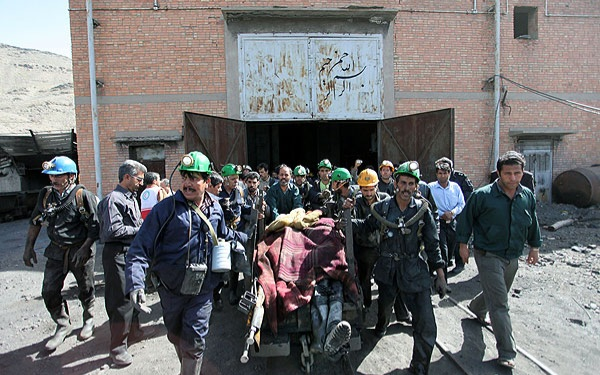
- Recovery of bodies from the tunnel where the explosion occurred
- Date: April 19, 2009
- Time: Morning
- Location: Iran, Kerman, Zarand, Bab Nizou Mine; 30°30′34″N 56°38′58″E
- Cause: Methane gas accumulation and explosion
- Deaths: 12
- Injuries: 0

The Bab Nizou Mine Explosion occurred on April 19, 2009, at the Bab Nizou Mine in Zarand. This incident, caused by the explosion of accumulated methane gas, resulted in the deaths of 12 people. The Bab Nizou Mine is located 38 kilometers southeast of Zarand in Kerman province.

== Incident Review ==
Nearly two years after the explosion at the Bab Nizou Mine in Kerman, which claimed 12 lives, the Islamic Consultative Assembly formed an investigation committee to determine the causes of the explosion. The committee, chaired by parliamentarian Alireza Mahjoub, began its work on November 7, 2009.

The methane gas explosion occurred at a depth of 250 to 300 meters in the Bab Nizou Mine in Zarand, killing 12 workers employed by the private company "Delta 1000". Previously, two other explosions in 2005 had claimed the lives of 14 workers at the same mine. In its report on the Bab Nizou Mine Explosion, the parliamentary committee noted serious safety issues, particularly with the mine's elevator system, warning that even a minor malfunction could have resulted in the workers plummeting to the bottom of the shaft.

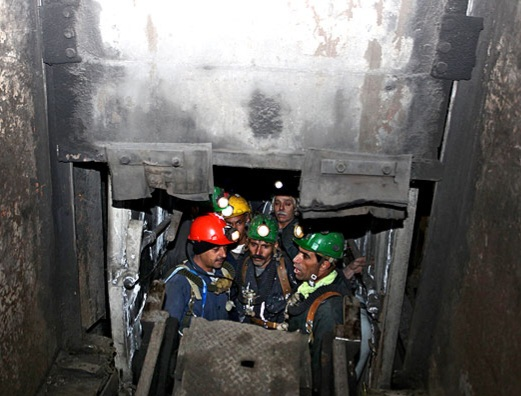
Workers and rescuers using the elevator during relief efforts

The committee also highlighted several other deficiencies at the Bab Nizou Mine, including harsh working conditions, outdated equipment, difficulty breathing in deep tunnels, and substandard ventilation systems. It was classified as a high-risk mine, yet proper safety measures were not implemented by the Ministry of Industries and Mines or the Ministry of Labor and Social Affairs.

Privatized in 2004, the mine continued operations without proper attention to equipment and lacked oversight from the Ministry of Labor and Social Affairs, leading to coal extraction under unsafe conditions. Furthermore, the privatization process itself was incomplete and involved legal violations.

== Outcome ==
Following complaints from the families of the deceased, Branch 102 of the Zarand Criminal Court conducted an investigation. Those responsible for the explosion were ordered to pay blood money to the victims’ families and were sentenced to custodial penalties.
