= Infrared search and track =

Method for detecting and tracking objects that give off infrared radiation

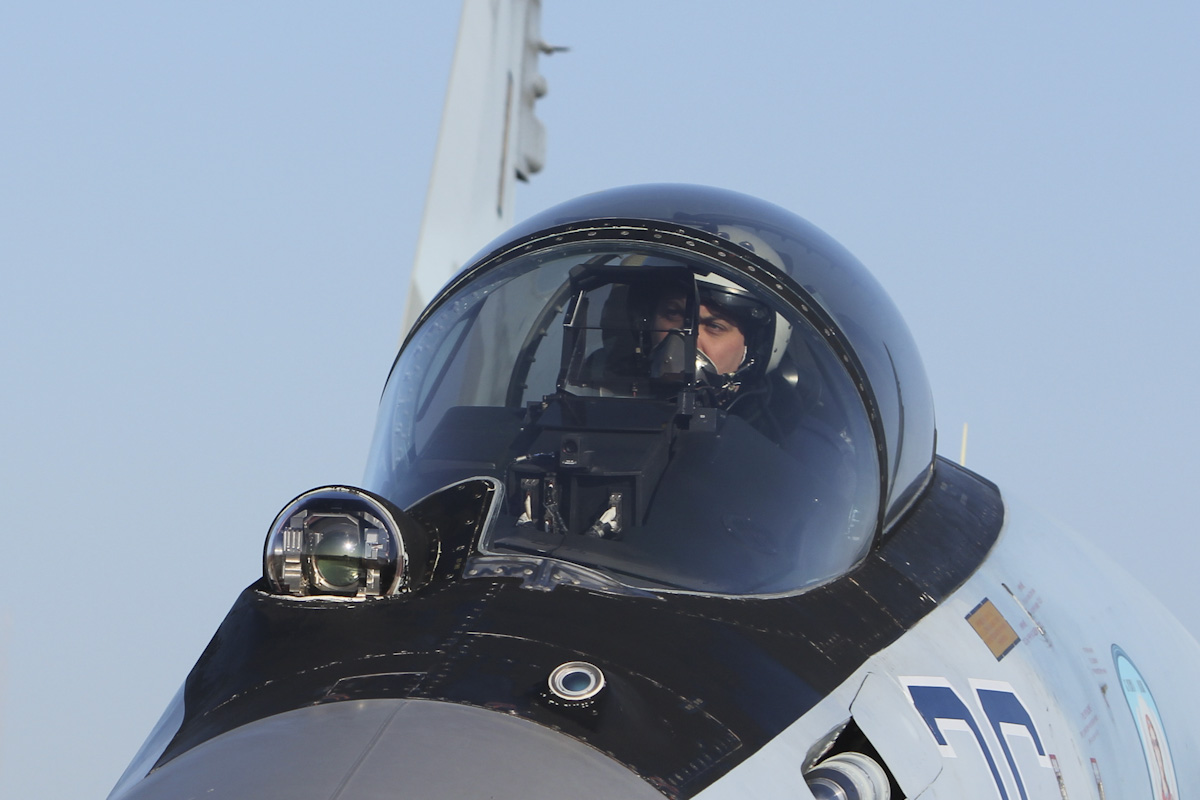
An IRST sensor on a Sukhoi Su-35

An Infrared Search and Track (IRST) system (sometimes called infrared sighting and tracking) detects and tracks objects that emit infrared radiation, such as the infrared signatures of jet aircraft and helicopters. Some naval surface vessels, such as the Istanbul-class frigate, are also equipped with IRST.

A generalized case of forward-looking infrared (FLIR) systems, IRST systems provide all-around situation awareness. Their thermographic cameras are passive: unlike radar, they do not emit radiation and therefore do not add to an aircraft's emissions signature. Within range, an IRST's angular resolution is better than radar because infrared has a shorter wavelength than radar emissions. But an IRST's range is less than radar because infrared emissions are attenuated by the atmosphere and by poor weather (although less so than visible light).

== History ==
=== Early systems ===
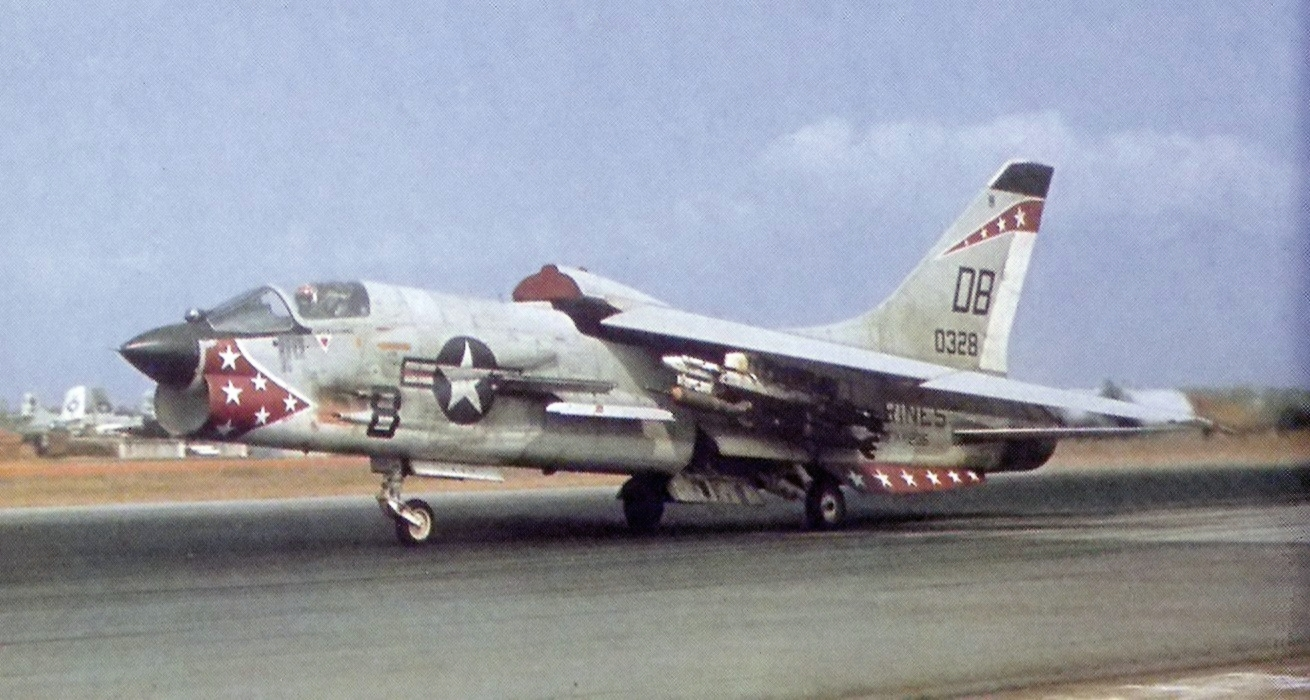
An April 1966 photo of an F-8E Crusader of VMF(AW)-235 at Da Nang shows the IRST in front of the canopy.

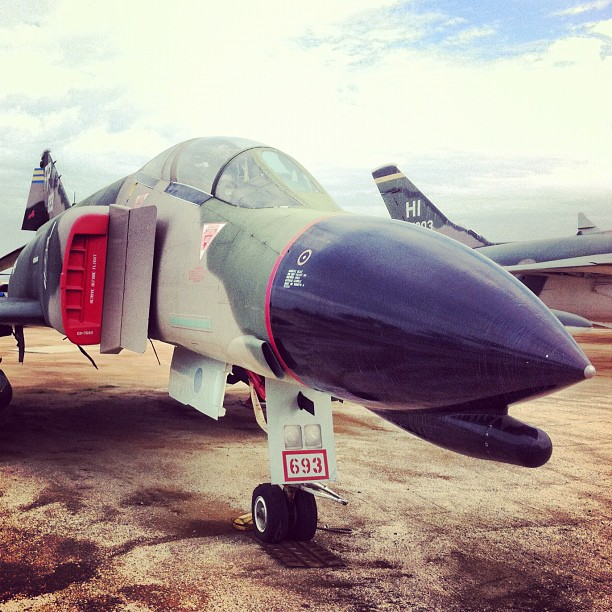
AN/AAA-4 IRST under the nose of an F-4 Phantom

IRSTs first appeared in the F-101 Voodoo, F-102 Delta Dagger, and F-106 Delta Dart interceptors. The F-106 had an early IRST mounting replaced in 1963 with a production retractable mount. An IRST was added to the F-8 Crusader (F-8E variant). A similar Texas Instruments AN/AAA-4 was installed under the nose of early production aircraft F-4 Phantom B and C models. It was not installed on later F-4Ds due to limited capabilities, but retained the bulge; some F-4Ds had the IRST receiver retrofitted in a modified form.

The F-4E eliminated the AAA-4 IRST bulge and received an internal gun mount which took up the area under the nose. The F-4J which had a pulse-Doppler radar also eliminated the AAA-4 IRST receiver and bulge under the nose.

The first use of IRST in a Eurasian country was the Mikoyan-Gurevich MiG-23, which used the (TP-23ML) IRST; later versions used the (26SH1) IRST. The Mikoyan-Gurevich MiG-25PD was also equipped with a small IRST under the nose.

The Swedish Saab J-35F2 Draken (1965) and J 35J Draken also used IRST units, a Hughes Aircraft Company N71.

=== Later systems ===
IRST systems re-appeared on more modern designs starting in the 1980s with the introduction of 2-D sensors, which cued both horizontal and vertical angle. A cued search is a search performed in a relatively small volume to acquire a target whose position is approximately known. The target´s position can have been approximately obtained by other sensors or supplied from an external source. Sensitivities were also greatly improved, leading to better resolution and range. In more recent years, new systems have entered the market. In 2015, Northrop Grumman introduced its OpenPod IRST pod, which uses a sensor by Leonardo. The United States Air Force is currently incorporating IRST systems for its fighter aircraft fleet, including the F-15, F-16, and F-22.

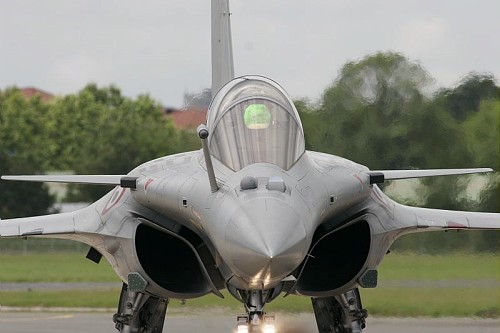
Optronique secteur frontal (IRST) of the Dassault Rafale, below the cockpit and to the side of the refueling boom. On the left, the main IR sensor (100 km range), on the right a TV/IR identification sensor with laser rangefinder (40 km range)

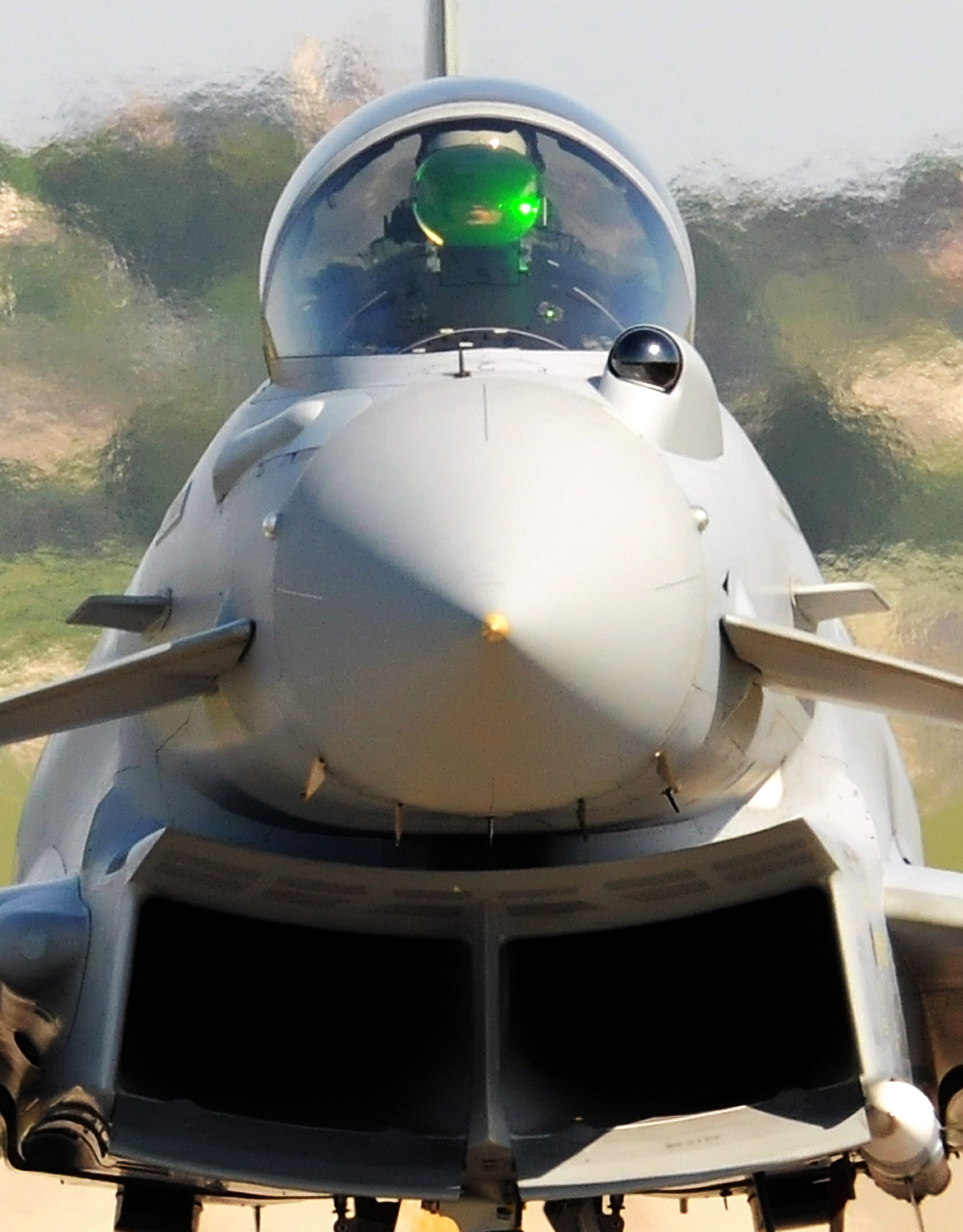
Eurofighter Typhoon with PIRATE IRST

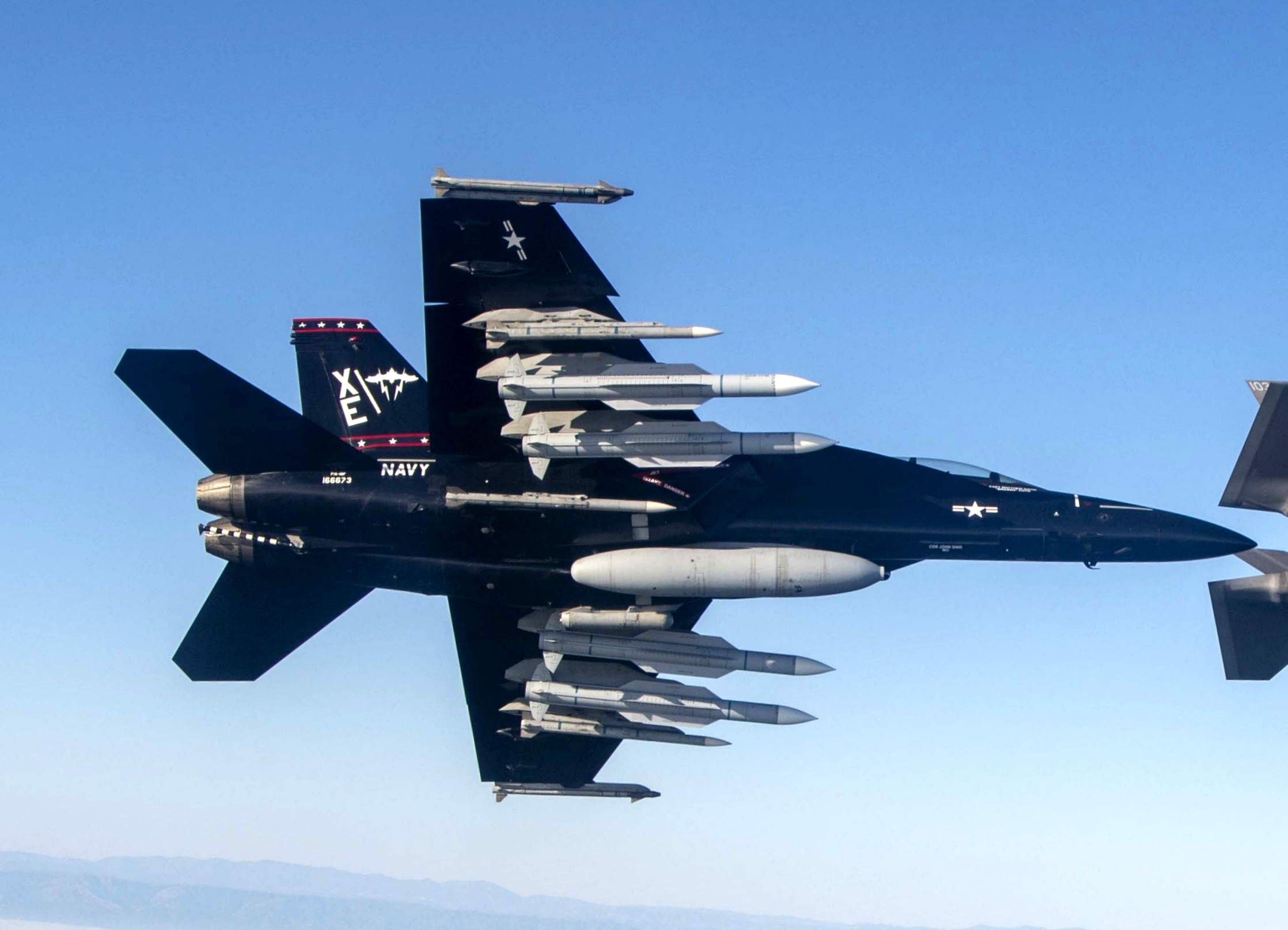
F/A-18F Super Hornet with AN/ASG-34(V)1 IRST21 sensor in a modified drop tank on its centerline

While IRST systems are most common amongst aircraft, land-based, ship and submarine systems are available.

=== Distributed Aperture Systems ===
The F-35 is equipped with infrared search and track system AN/AAQ-37 Distributed Aperture System (DAS), which consists of six IR sensors around the aircraft for full spherical coverage, providing day/night imaging and acting as an IRST and missile approach warning system.

Chengdu J-20 and Shenyang FC-31 is assumed to share the similar design concept with their system. IRST systems can also be used to detect stealth aircraft, in some cases, outperforming traditional radar.

== Technology ==
These were fairly simple systems consisting of an infra-red sensor with a horizontally rotating shutter in front of it. The shutter was slaved to a display under the main interception radar display in the cockpit. Any IR light falling on the sensor would generate a "pip" on the display, in a fashion similar to the B-scopes used on early radars.

The display was primarily intended to allow the radar operator to manually turn the radar to the approximate angle of the target, in an era when radar systems had to be "locked on" by hand. The system was considered to be of limited utility, and with the introduction of more automated radars they disappeared from fighter designs for some time.

== Performance ==
Detection range varies with external factors such as

- clouds
- altitude
- air temperature
- target's attitude
- target's speed

The higher the altitude, the less dense the atmosphere and the less infrared radiation it absorbs - especially at longer wavelengths. The effect of reduction in friction between air and aircraft does not compensate for the better transmission of infrared radiation. Therefore, infrared detection ranges are longer at high altitudes.

At high altitudes, temperatures range from −30 to −50 °C - which provide better contrast between aircraft temperature and background temperature.

The Eurofighter Typhoon's PIRATE IRST can detect subsonic fighters from 50 km from the front and 90 km from the rear - the larger value being the consequence of directly observing the engine exhaust, with an even greater increase being possible if the target uses afterburners.

The range at which a target can be identified with sufficient confidence to decide on weapon release is significantly inferior to the detection range - manufacturers have claimed it is about 65% of the detection range.

== Tactics ==
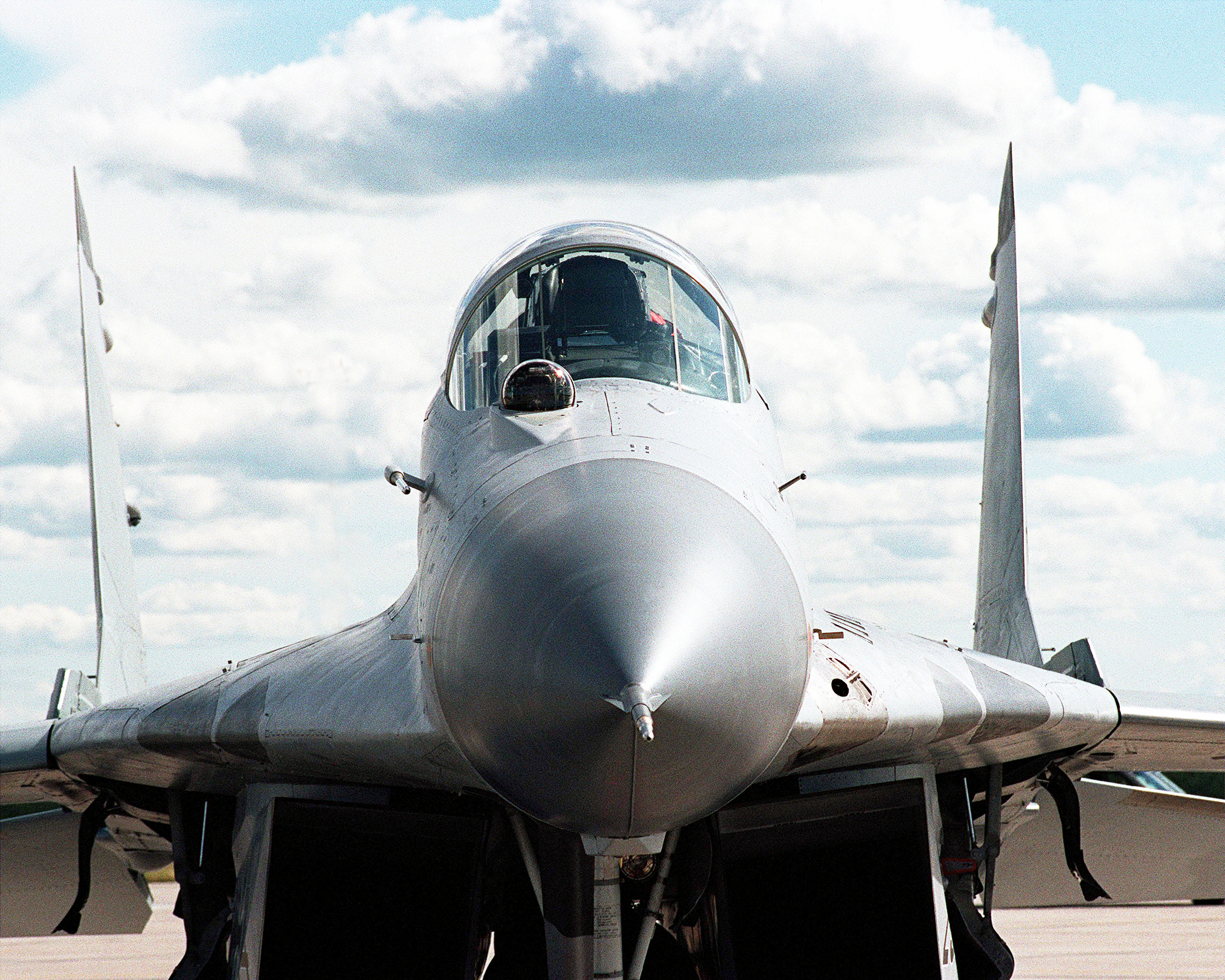
MiG-29 nose showing radome and S-31E2 KOLS IRST

With infrared homing or fire-and-forget missiles, the fighter may be able to fire upon the target without having to turn on its radar sets at all. Otherwise, the fighter can turn the radar on and achieve a lock immediately before firing if desired. The fighter could also close to within cannon range and engage that way.

Whether or not they use their radar, the IRST system can still allow them to launch a surprise attack.

An IRST system may also have a regular magnified optical sight slaved to it, to help the IRST-equipped aircraft identify the target at long range. As opposed to an ordinary forward looking infrared system, an IRST system will actually scan the space around the aircraft similarly to the way in which mechanically (or even electronically) steered radars work. The exception to the scanning technique is the F-35's DAS, which stares in all directions simultaneously, and automatically detects and declares aircraft and missiles in all directions, without a limit to the number of targets simultaneously tracked.

When they find one or more potential targets they will alert the pilot(s) and display the location of each target relative to the aircraft on a screen, much like a radar. Again similarly to the way a radar works, the operator can tell the IRST to track a particular target of interest, once it has been identified, or scan in a particular direction if a target is believed to be there (for example, because of an advisory from AWACS or another aircraft).

IRST systems can incorporate laser rangefinders in order to provide full fire-control solutions for cannon fire or launching missiles (Optronique Secteur Frontal). The combination of an atmospheric propagation model, the apparent surface of the target, and target motion analysis (TMA) IRST can calculate the range.

== List of modern IRST systems ==
The best known modern IRST systems are:

- China
  - EORD-31 IRST
- France
  - Safran Vampir MB
  - Safran Vampir NG
  - Safran EONS-NG
  - Thales Group ARTEMIS
  - Safran/Thales Optronique secteur frontal OSF
- India
  - OLS-30 — to be replaced by indigenous dual-band IRST
- Italy
  - Leonardo S.p.A. SASS
  - Leonardo Skyward-G
  - Leonardo DSS-IRST
- Italy / Spain / United Kingdom
  - EuroFIRST PIRATE
- Netherlands
  - Thales Nederland Sirius
- Russia
  - OEPS-27/30
  - OLS-35
  - 8TK
  - OEPS-29/OLS-13SM-1
  - 101KS-V
- South Korea
  - SAQ-600K
- Spain
  - Indra Sistemas/Tecnobit IRST i110
- Sweden
  - Skyward-G
- Turkey
  - Aselsan KARAT (aircraft-based IRST)
  - Aselsan PIRI (ship-based IRST)
- United States
  - AN/AAS-42 IRST
  - AN/ASG-34 IRST21
  - AN/AAQ-32 IFTS
  - AIRST
  - AN/AAQ-40 Electro-Optical Targeting System
  - AN/AAQ-37 Electro-optical Distributed Aperture System)
  - Mark 46 Mod 1
  - Mark 20 Mod 1

Fighter aircraft carry the IRST systems for use instead of radar when the situation warrants it, such as when shadowing other aircraft, under the control of Airborne Early Warning & Control (AEW&C) aircraft, or executing a Ground-Controlled interception (GCI), where an external radar is used to help vector the fighter to a target and the IRST is used to pick up and track the target once the fighter is in range.

== See also ==
- Electro-optical targeting system
- List of military electronics of the United States
