= Tabas =

City in South Khorasan province, Iran

Tabas Persian: طبس
- City
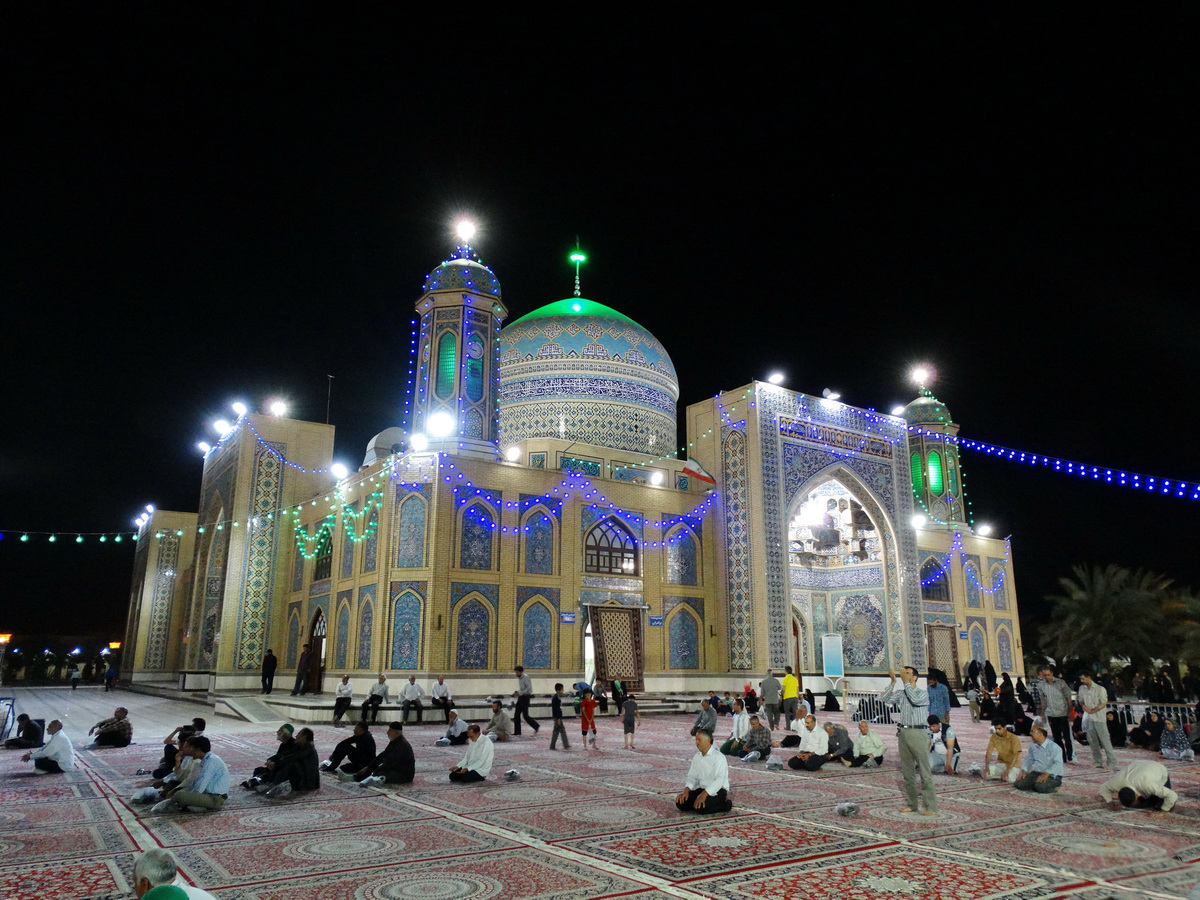
- Hosein Ibn Mosa Alkazem's Shrine in Tabas

- Location within Iran
- Coordinates: 33°35′46″N 56°55′41″E
- Country: Iran
- Province: South Khorasan
- County: Tabas
- District: Central
- Highest elevation: 730 m (2,400 ft)
- Lowest elevation: 660 m (2,170 ft)

Population (2016)
  - Total: 39,676
- Time zone: UTC+3:30 (IRST)

Tabas (Persian: طبس) (Note: Also romanized as Ṭabas; formerly known as Golshan) is a city in the Central District of Tabas County, South Khorasan province, Iran, serving as capital of both the county and the district.

== History ==
=== Early history ===
The history of Tabas dates back to pre-Islamic times. It was an important outpost of the Sassanid empire.

Due to its strategic location at the edge of the Great Salt Desert, and at the confluence of many roads, the geographer al-Baladhuri called the city "the Gate of Khurasan". In the early Islamic period it was known as Tabas al-Tamr (lit. 'Tabas of the Dates') due to a large forest of date palms that grew there, and later as Tabas Gilaki after a famous governor of the city, Abu'l-Hasan ibn Muhammad Gilaki, who in the mid-11th century had pacified the region. Along with the town of Tabas-e Masina further east, it gave its name to the local district, Tabasayn. In the 10th–11th centuries, the town is described as well fortified, with several villages around. Medieval and geographers note that it was amply supplied with water due to underground wells; the town even featured hot baths, and extensive lemon and orange plantations. In the late 11th century, it became part of the Nizari Ismaili state, and was besieged by the Seljuk Turks under Ahmad Sanjar in 1102 during the Nizari-Seljuk conflicts.

Tabas was spared when the Mongols attacked Iran. It had a local government incorporating not only Tabas but also Tun (Ferdows) and Gonabad. After the death of Nader Shah in 1747, it as under the control of the Zangu'i Arabs as an independent state which included nearby Tun. For a time they even kidnapped Nader Mirza Afshar and placed the Kurds of Khabushan in control of Mashhad.

=== Earthquake of 1978 ===
In 1978, the 7.4 M_{w} Tabas earthquake affected the city with a maximum Mercalli intensity of IX (Violent). At least 15,000 people were killed. Since then, the city has been rebuilt with many new streets, parks and public buildings.

=== Operation Eagle Claw ===
The failed rescue American operation Operation Eagle Claw on 24–25 April 1980 to free American hostages in Tehran occurred near Tabas in Tabas Country about 127km southwest of Tabas town by the road to Yazd location (33.07020674739667;55.89196171977231). In Iran, the operation is called amaliat tabas (Tabas operation), and the significance and aftermath of the failed operation made the city Tabas known in almost every corner of Iran. The Tabas air defense system is accordingly named so.

=== Administrative changes ===
At first, Tabas County was part of Khorasan province. It became a part of Yazd province in 2004, joining South Khorasan province in 2013.

== Demographics ==
=== Language ===
The people of Tabas speak a Khorasani accent of Persian that sounds somewhat different from the standard Iranian version ("Tehrani accent").

=== Population ===
At the time of the 2006 National Census, the city's population was 30,681 in 7,962 households, when it was in Yazd province. The following census in 2011 counted 35,150 people in 9,903 households. The 2016 census measured the population of the city as 39,676 people in 11,876 households, by which time the county had been separated from the province to join South Khorasan province.

== Geography ==
=== Location ===
Tabas is in central Iran, 950 kilometers southeast of Tehran, in South Khorasan Province.

It is a desert city with many date and citrus trees. It has a 300-year-old public garden (Bagh-e-Golshan). There is also a shrine in Tabas that is visited every year by thousands of pilgrims. Tabas has two universities with 2,500 to 3,500 students. The city has hot summers, and people rarely see a winter snowfall.

=== Climate ===
Tabas has a hot desert climate (Köppen BWh). The record high temperature of 50.0 °C (122.0 °F) was recorded on July 25, 2025.

Climate data for Tabas (1991-2020)
Month	Jan	Feb	Mar	Apr	May	Jun	Jul	Aug	Sep	Oct	Nov	Dec	Year
Record high °C (°F)	24.0 (75.2)	31.0 (87.8)	39.0 (102.2)	43.0 (109.4)	46.0 (114.8)	48.5 (119.3)	50.0 (122.0)	49.7 (121.5)	45.3 (113.5)	41.0 (105.8)	33.7 (92.7)	27.3 (81.1)	50.0 (122.0)
Mean daily maximum °C (°F)	14.7 (58.5)	18.2 (64.8)	23.9 (75.0)	30.6 (87.1)	36.4 (97.5)	41.7 (107.1)	43.3 (109.9)	41.5 (106.7)	38.0 (100.4)	31.5 (88.7)	22.8 (73.0)	16.5 (61.7)	29.9 (85.8)
Daily mean °C (°F)	8.3 (46.9)	11.4 (52.5)	16.9 (62.4)	23.6 (74.5)	29.7 (85.5)	34.8 (94.6)	36.5 (97.7)	34.5 (94.1)	30.0 (86.0)	23.4 (74.1)	15.3 (59.5)	9.7 (49.5)	22.8 (73.0)
Mean daily minimum °C (°F)	3.6 (38.5)	6.1 (43.0)	11.1 (52.0)	17.2 (63.0)	22.9 (73.2)	27.4 (81.3)	29.5 (85.1)	27.4 (81.3)	22.6 (72.7)	16.7 (62.1)	9.9 (49.8)	5.0 (41.0)	16.6 (61.9)
Record low °C (°F)	−6.4 (20.5)	−4.2 (24.4)	−0.2 (31.6)	4.2 (39.6)	12.0 (53.6)	18.6 (65.5)	23.4 (74.1)	18.8 (65.8)	12.6 (54.7)	7.8 (46.0)	−5.9 (21.4)	−5.2 (22.6)	−6.4 (20.5)
Average precipitation mm (inches)	15.3 (0.60)	13.8 (0.54)	19.0 (0.75)	13.1 (0.52)	3.8 (0.15)	0.2 (0.01)	0.0 (0.0)	0.1 (0.00)	0.0 (0.0)	0.9 (0.04)	4.4 (0.17)	11.0 (0.43)	81.6 (3.21)
Average precipitation days (≥ 1.0 mm)	3.0	2.8	3.2	2.5	0.8	0.1	0.0	0.0	0.0	0.2	1.5	2.2	16.3
Average relative humidity (%)	50	42	35	27	20	14	14	14	15	22	34	47	27.8
Average dew point °C (°F)	−2.5 (27.5)	−2.4 (27.7)	−0.8 (30.6)	1.7 (35.1)	2.7 (36.9)	2.2 (36.0)	3.4 (38.1)	2.6 (36.7)	−0.2 (31.6)	−0.7 (30.7)	−1.5 (29.3)	−2.1 (28.2)	0.2 (32.4)
Mean monthly sunshine hours	211	210	239	268	322	358	371	361	321	292	232	215	3,400
Source 1: NOAA NCEI
Source 2: Ogimet

Climate data for Tabas
Month	Jan	Feb	Mar	Apr	May	Jun	Jul	Aug	Sep	Oct	Nov	Dec	Year
Mean daily maximum °C (°F)	13.6 (56.5)	17.2 (63.0)	23.0 (73.4)	29.4 (84.9)	35.3 (95.5)	40.7 (105.3)	42.2 (108.0)	40.5 (104.9)	37.1 (98.8)	30.6 (87.1)	22.6 (72.7)	15.6 (60.1)	29.0 (84.2)
Daily mean °C (°F)	7.7 (45.9)	10.9 (51.6)	16.3 (61.3)	22.4 (72.3)	28.1 (82.6)	33.0 (91.4)	35.0 (95.0)	33.0 (91.4)	28.8 (83.8)	22.6 (72.7)	15.4 (59.7)	9.4 (48.9)	21.9 (71.4)
Mean daily minimum °C (°F)	1.8 (35.2)	4.6 (40.3)	9.5 (49.1)	15.4 (59.7)	20.9 (69.6)	25.3 (77.5)	27.7 (81.9)	25.4 (77.7)	20.5 (68.9)	14.6 (58.3)	8.2 (46.8)	3.3 (37.9)	14.8 (58.6)
Average precipitation mm (inches)	16.0 (0.63)	14.2 (0.56)	16.8 (0.66)	12.6 (0.50)	4.1 (0.16)	0.2 (0.01)	0.1 (0.00)	0.0 (0.0)	0.0 (0.0)	1.4 (0.06)	3.9 (0.15)	12.9 (0.51)	82.2 (3.24)
Average precipitation days (≥ 1.0 mm)	3	2	2	1	0	0	0	0	0	0	1	2	11
Average relative humidity (%)	57	48	39	33	26	19	19	19	21	28	39	52	33
Source: https://irimo.ir

== Economy ==
=== Agricultural products ===
The agricultural products of this desert city are very significant. Products such as: oranges, pistachios, dates, persimmons, summer fruits and daffodils; Also, tea bread, chickpea bread, and jams that are prepared from agricultural products, such as: spring orange jam, balang jam, orange peel jam, and Tabas mountain and local liqueurs.

=== Mines ===
Tabas has some of the richest coal mines of Iran.

The 2024 Tabas coal mine explosion in the Tabas Parvadeh 5 Mine claimed at least 51 lives.

== Transportation ==
Multiple bus lines, a railroad station and an airport connect Tabas to Mashhad, Yazd, Tehran, Kerman and Birjand (the capital city of South Khorasan province).

== Notable people ==
- Abbas Vaez-Tabasi, born 25 June 1935 in Tabas; Grand Imam and Chairman of the Astan Quds Razavi board
- Massoud Rajavi, born 18 August 1948 in Tabas; one of the two leaders of the People's Mujahedin of Iran

== Gallery ==
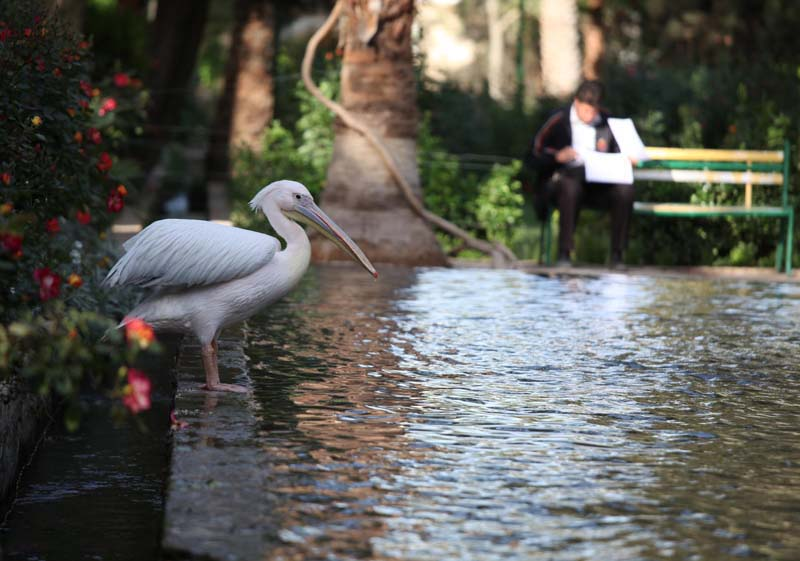
Golshan Garden

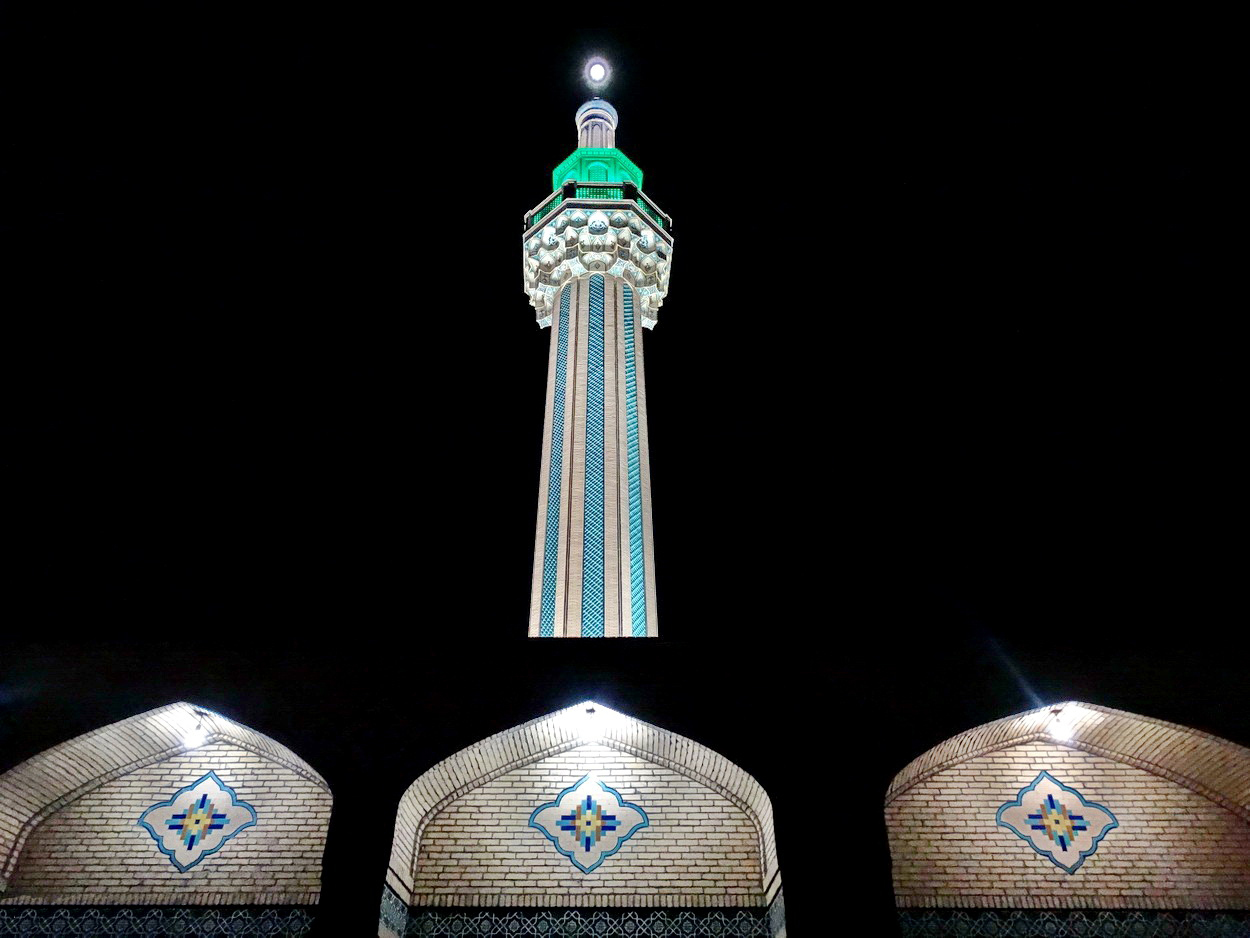

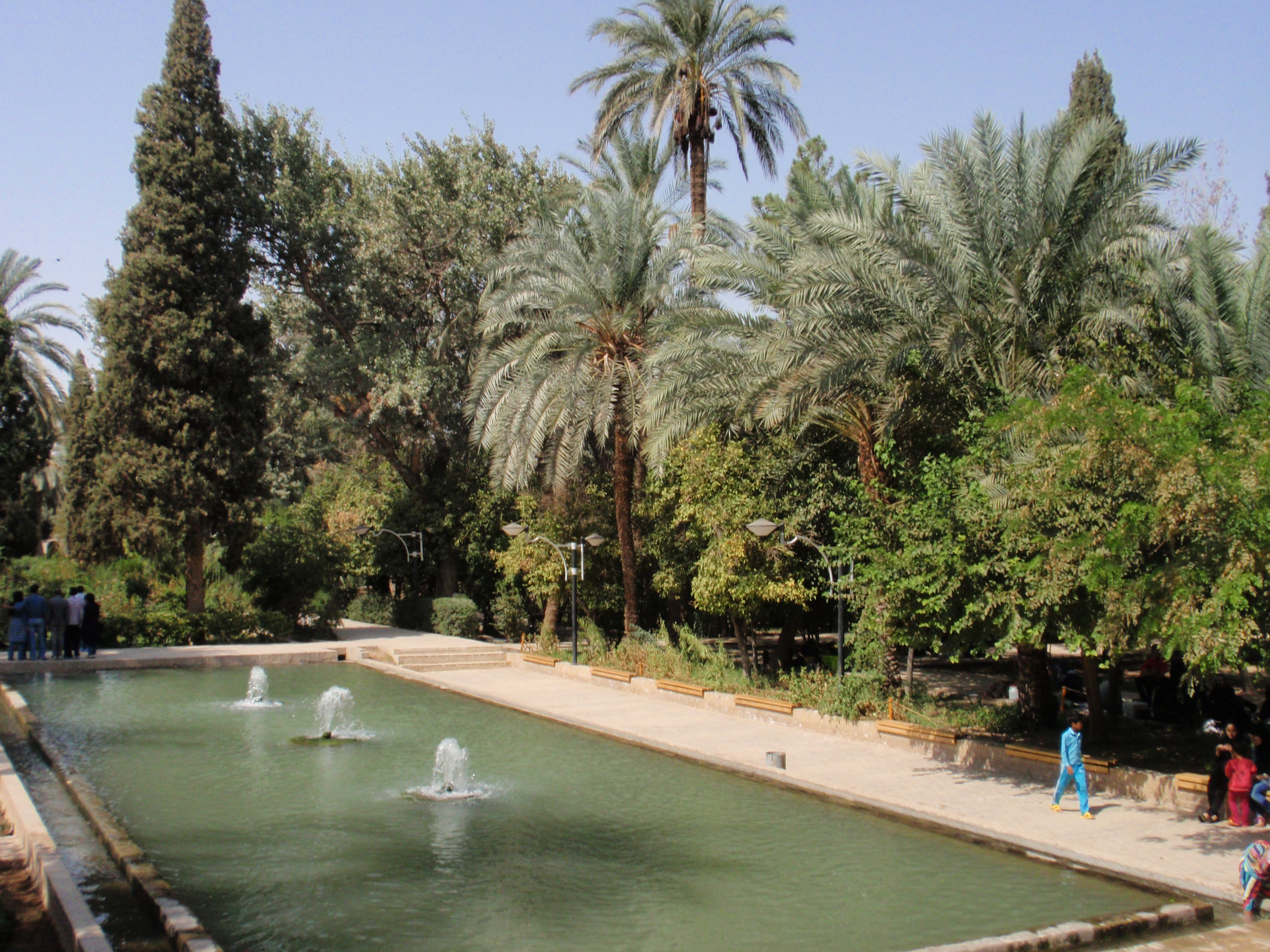
Golshan Garden
