= Optronique secteur frontal =

Targeting system for French combat aircraft

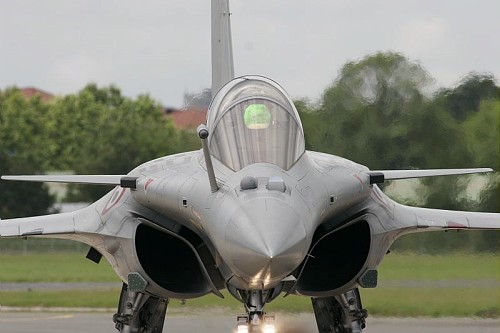
The front hemisphere of the OSF is visible above the nose cone, beside the refuelling probe.

The Optronique Secteur Frontal (OSF) [literally: Frontal Sector Optronics] is a long-range optoelectronics system, developed for the French Dassault Rafale combat aircraft. The OSF is able to perform the same functions as a radar without producing any radiation, thus preventing detection.

It allows target tracking through IRST (infrared search and track) and visual sensors. On the left, the main IR detector can be used as forward-looking infrared (FLIR) sending a video signal to the pilot, or to detect air targets at ranges up to 100 km and ground or sea targets up to 6 km. On the right, a TV/IR sensor (31kg) is used for target identification within a 40 km range including a laser rangefinder. The OSF assembly has a volume of 80 liters and a weight of 87 kg.

Visible waveband capability is included to identify targets in situations where visual identification is required by the rules of engagement.

The benefits of OSF in air-to-air scenarios are passive long-range detection and target identification before engagement.
