= Elevator (aeronautics) =

Aircraft control surface used to control pitch

Elevators' effect on pitch

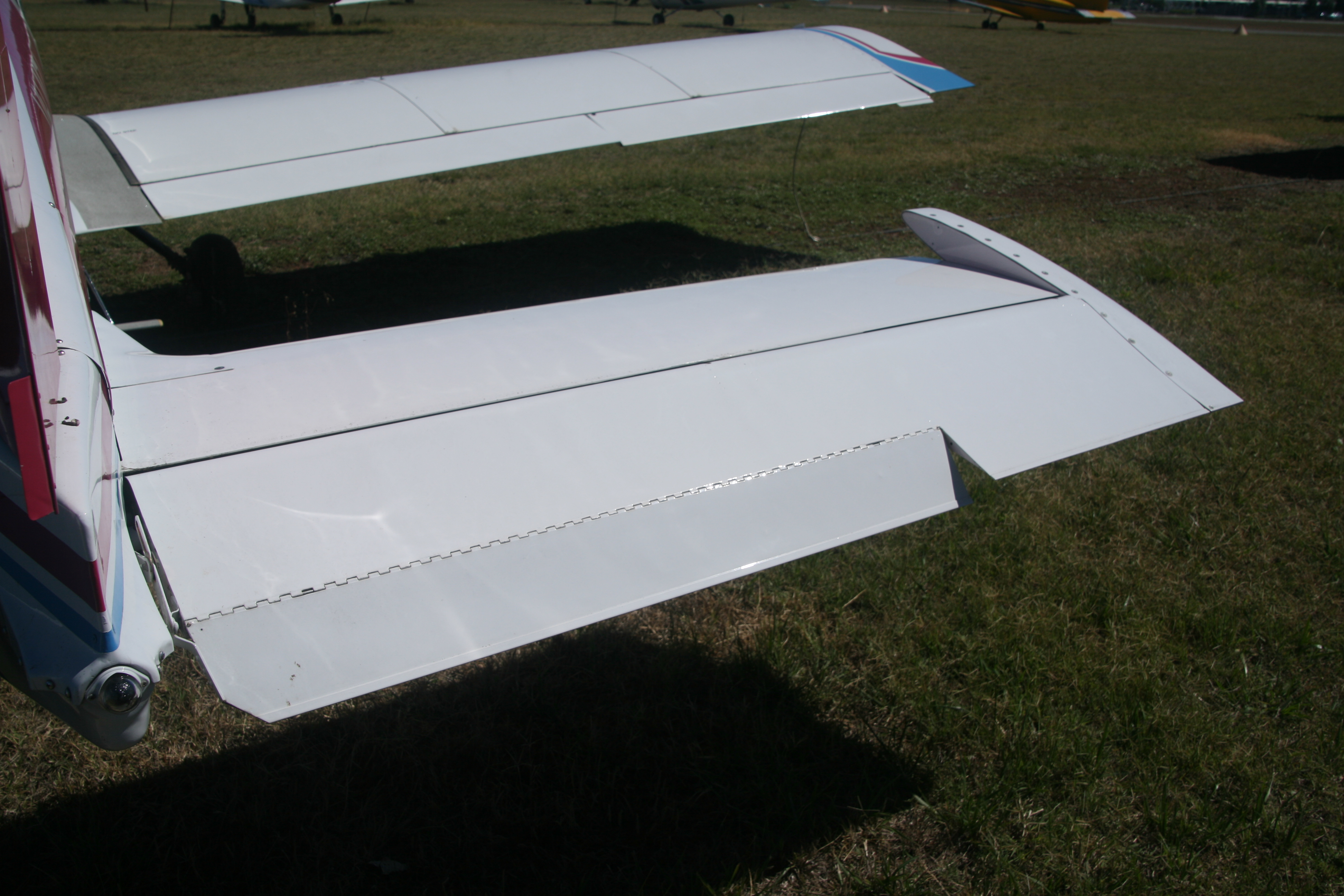
Elevator and pitch trim tab of a light aircraft

Elevators are flight control surfaces, usually at the rear of an aircraft, which control the aircraft's pitch, and therefore the angle of attack and the lift of the wing. The elevators are usually hinged to the tailplane or horizontal stabilizer. They may be the only pitch control surface present, and are sometimes located at the front of the aircraft (early airplanes and canards) or integrated into a rear "all-moving tailplane", also called a slab elevator or stabilator.

== Elevator control effectiveness ==
The elevator is a usable up and down system that controls the plane, horizontal stabilizer usually creates a downward force which balances the nose down moment created by the wing lift force, which typically applies at a point (the wing center of lift) situated aft of the airplane's center of gravity. The effects of drag and changing the engine thrust may also result in pitch moments that need to be compensated with the horizontal stabilizer.

Both the horizontal stabilizer and the elevator contribute to pitch stability, but only the elevators provide pitch control. They do so by decreasing or increasing the downward force created by the stabilizer:

- an increased downward force, produced by up elevator, forces the tail down and the nose up. At constant speed, the wing's increased angle of attack causes a greater lift to be produced by the wing, accelerating the aircraft upwards. The drag and power demand also increase;
- a decreased downward force at the tail, produced by down elevator, causes the tail to rise and the nose to lower. At constant speed, the decrease in angle of attack reduces the lift, accelerating the aircraft downwards.

On many low-speed aircraft, a trim tab is present at the rear of the elevator, which the pilot can adjust to eliminate forces on the control column at the desired attitude and airspeed. Supersonic aircraft usually have all-moving tailplanes (stabilators), because shock waves generated on the horizontal stabilizer greatly reduce the effectiveness of hinged elevators during supersonic flight. Delta winged aircraft combine ailerons and elevators –and their respective control inputs– into one control surface called an elevon.

== Elevators' location ==
Elevators are usually part of the tail, at the rear of an aircraft. In some aircraft, pitch-control surfaces are in the front, ahead of the wing. In a two-surface aircraft this type of configuration is called a canard (the French word for duck) or a tandem wing. The Wright Brothers' early aircraft were of the canard type; Mignet Pou-du-Ciel and Rutan Quickie are of tandem type. Some early three surface aircraft had front elevators (Curtiss/AEA June Bug); modern three surface aircraft may have both front (canard) and rear elevators (Grumman X-29).

== Research ==
Several technology research and development efforts exist to integrate the functions of aircraft flight control systems such as ailerons, elevators, elevons, flaps and flaperons into wings to perform the aerodynamic purpose with the advantages of less: mass, cost, drag, inertia (for faster, stronger control response), complexity (mechanically simpler, fewer moving parts or surfaces, less maintenance), and radar cross section for stealth. These may be used in many unmanned aerial vehicles (UAVs) and 6th generation fighter aircraft. Two promising approaches are flexible wings, and fluidics.

In flexible wings, much or all of a wing surface can change shape in flight to deflect air flow. The X-53 Active Aeroelastic Wing is a NASA effort. The Adaptive Compliant Wing is a military and commercial effort.

In fluidics, forces in vehicles occur via circulation control, in which larger more complex mechanical parts are replaced by smaller simpler fluidic systems (slots which emit air flows) where larger forces in fluids are diverted by smaller jets or flows of fluid intermittently, to change the direction of vehicles. In this use, fluidics promises lower mass, costs (up to 50% less), and very low inertia and response times, and simplicity.

== Gallery ==
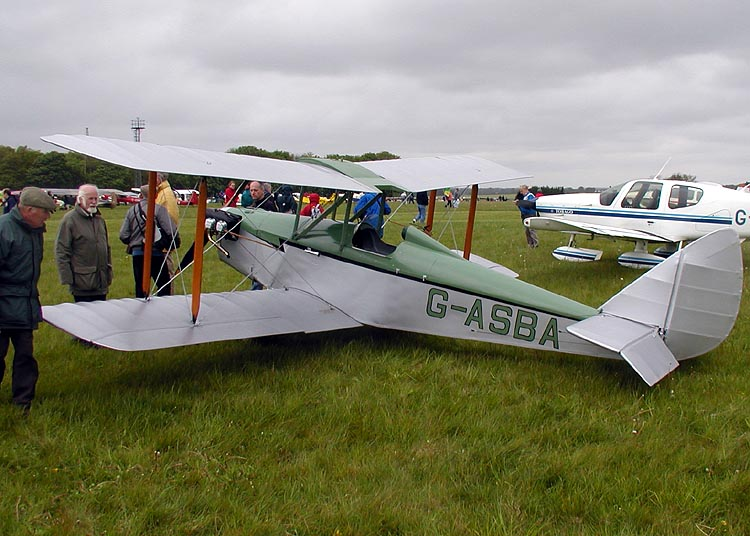
The elevator on this Currie Wot biplane is nearly touching the grass at the rear of this aircraft

The tail of an Airbus A380, showing the elevators at the rear of the horizontal stabilizer

== See also ==
- Rudder
- Aileron
