= Variable-camber wing =

Feature of aircraft wings

Variable camber is a feature of some aircraft wings that changes the camber (or curvature) of the main aerofoil during flight.

In one system, the leading and/or trailing edge sections of the whole wing pivot to increase the effective camber of the wing. This may be used to increase the maximum lift coefficient in order to shorten the take-off run, or to enhance manoeuvrability in the air. An early example was flown on the Westland N.16 of 1917.

Although flaps on the trailing or leading edge of a wing do vary the overall camber and are sometimes described as camber–changing flaps, they do not vary the main lifting surface in the same way that a variable-camber wing does.

Various other mechanisms have been tried. These include a device that controls the location and shape of the entire upper surface of the airfoil, a retractable bridge that connects two separate high aspect ratio wings, turning them into a single low aspect ratio wing or with telescopic segments that could be forced out, increasing the thickness, chord and shape of the affected portion of the wing. The Parker Variable Wing had a fully flexible aerofoil.

== See also ==
- Variable-sweep wing
- Variable-incidence wing
- Boeing X-53 Active Aeroelastic Wing
- Adaptive compliant wing
