= Elevon =

Aircraft control surface used to control pitch and roll

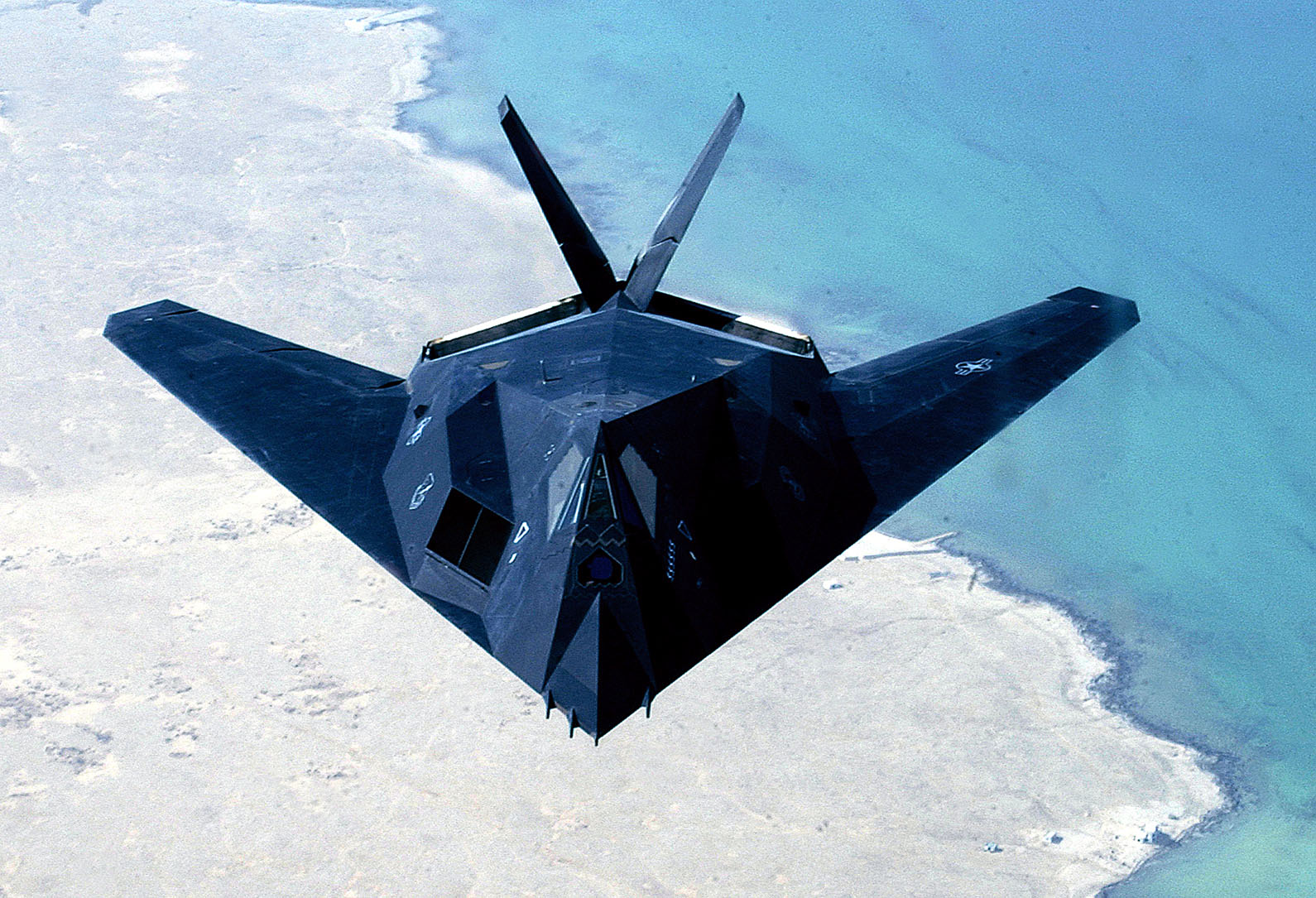
Elevons at the wing trailing edge are used for pitch and roll control. Top: on the F-102A Delta Dagger of 1953, an early use. Bottom: on the F-117A Nighthawk of 1981.

Elevons or tailerons are aircraft control surfaces that combine the functions of the elevator (used for pitch control) and the aileron (used for roll control), hence the name. They are frequently used on tailless aircraft such as flying wings. An elevon that is not part of the main wing, but instead is a separate tail surface, is a stabilator (but stabilators are also used for pitch control only, with no roll function, as on the Piper Cherokee series of aircraft).

Elevons are installed on each side of the aircraft at the trailing edge of the wing. When moved in the same direction (up or down) they will cause a pitching force (nose up or nose down) to be applied to the airframe. When moved differentially, (one up, one down) they will cause a rolling force to be applied. These forces may be applied simultaneously by appropriate positioning of the elevons e.g. one wing's elevons completely down and the other wing's elevons partly down.

An aircraft with elevons is controlled as though the pilot still has separate aileron and elevator surfaces at their disposal, controlled by the yoke or stick. The inputs of the two controls are mixed either mechanically or electronically to provide the appropriate position for each elevon.

== Applications ==
=== Operational aircraft ===
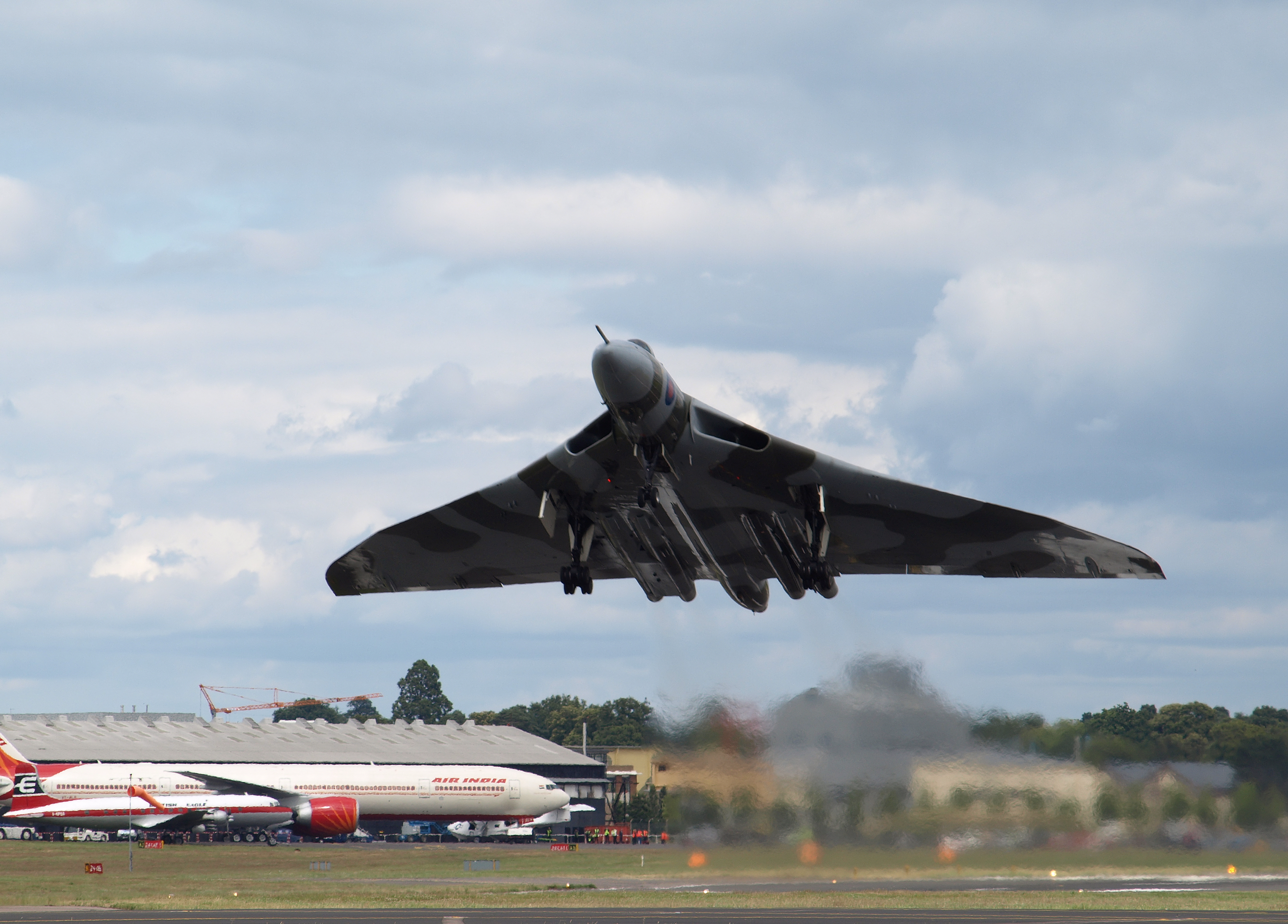
Avro Vulcan XH558 taking off at the 2008 Farnborough Airshow

One of the first operational aircraft to utilise elevons was the Avro Vulcan, a strategic bomber operated by the Royal Air Force's V-force. The original production variant of the Vulcan, designated as the B.1, did not have any elevons present; instead, it used an arrangement of four inboard elevators and four outboard ailerons along its delta wing for flight control. The Vulcan received elevons on its extensively redesigned second variant, the B.2'; all of the elevators and ailerons were deleted in favour of eight elevons. When flown at slow speeds, the elevons operated in close conjunction with the aircraft's six electrically actuated three-position airbrakes.

Another early aircraft to use elevons was the Convair F-102 Delta Dagger, an interceptor operated by the United States Air Force. A few years after the F-102's introduction, Convair built the B-58 Hustler, an early supersonic bomber, which was also equipped with elevons.

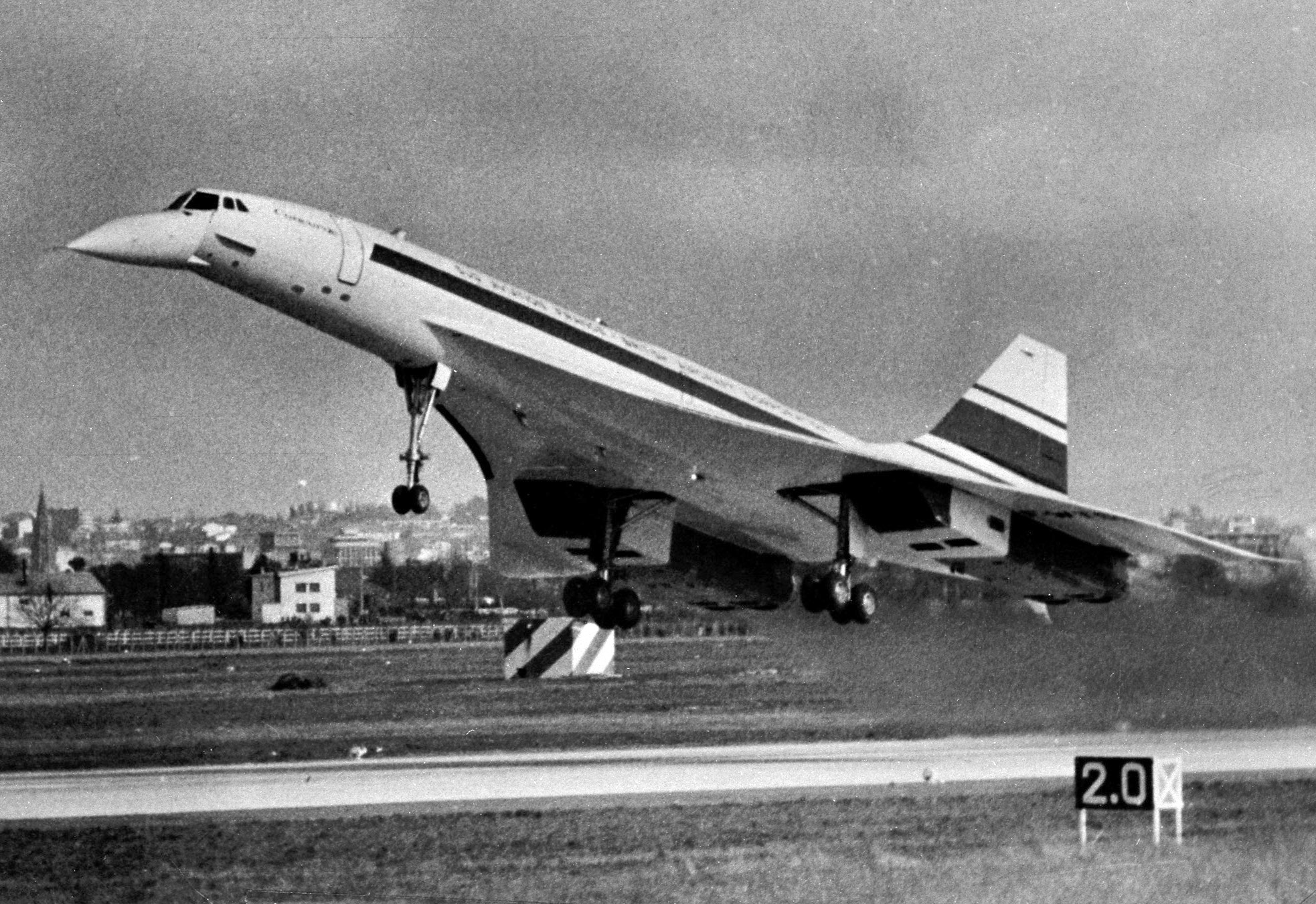
The first flight of Concorde 001 in 1969

Perhaps the most iconic aircraft fitted with elevons was the Aérospatiale/BAC Concorde, a British–French supersonic passenger airliner. In addition to the requirement to maintain precise directional control while flying at supersonic speeds, designers were also confronted by the need to appropriately address the substantial forces that were applied to the aircraft during banks and turns, which caused twisting and distortions of the aircraft's structure. The solution applied for both of these issues was via management of the elevons; specifically, as the aircraft speed varied, the active ratio between the inboard and outboard elevons was adjusted considerably. Only the innermost elevons, which are attached to the stiffest area of the wings, would be active while Concorde was flown at high speeds.

The Space Shuttle Orbiter was furnished with elevons, although these were only operable during atmospheric flight, which would be encountered during the vehicle's controlled descent back to Earth. There were a total of four elevons affixed to the trailing edges of its delta wing. While flown outside of atmospheric flight, the Shuttle's attitude control was instead provided by the Reaction Control System (RCS), which consisted of 44 compact liquid-fueled rocket thrusters controlled via a sophisticated fly-by-wire flight control system.

The Northrop Grumman B-2 Spirit, a large flying wing operated by the United States Air Force as a strategic stealth bomber, also used elevons in its control system. Northrop had opted to control the aircraft via a combination of split brake-rudders and differential thrust after assessing various different means of exercising directional control with minimal infringement on the aircraft's radar profile. Four pairs of control surfaces are positioned along the trailing edge of the wing's; while most surfaces are used throughout the aircraft's flight envelope, the inner elevons are normally only ever applied while being flown at slow speeds, such as on approach to landing. To avoid potential contact damage during takeoff and to provide a nose-down pitching attitude, all of the elevons remain drooped during takeoff until a high enough airspeed has been attained. The B-2's flight surfaces are automatically adjusted and repositioned without pilot input to do so, these changes being commanded by the aircraft's complex quadruplex computer-controlled fly-by-wire flight control system in order to counteract the inherent instability of the flying wing configuration.

=== Research programmes ===
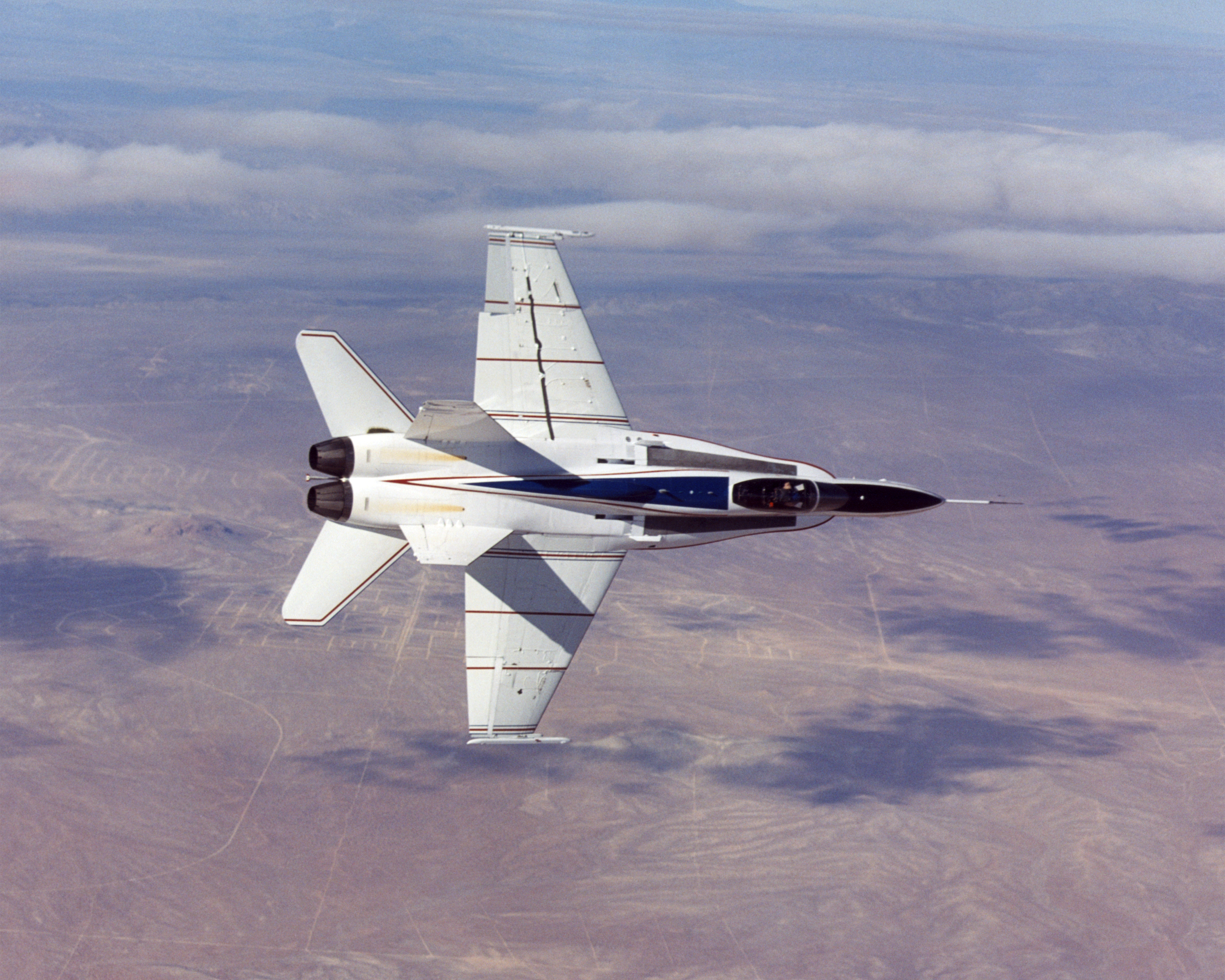
X-53 Active Aeroelastic Wing in flight

Several technology research and development efforts exist to integrate the functions of aircraft flight control systems such as ailerons, elevators, elevons and flaps into wings to perform the aerodynamic purpose with the advantages of less: mass, cost, drag, inertia (for faster, stronger control response), complexity (mechanically simpler, fewer moving parts or surfaces, less maintenance), and radar cross section for stealth. However, the main drawback is that when the elevons move up in unison to raise the pitch of the aircraft, generating additional lift, they reduce the camber, or downward curvature of the wing. Camber is desirable when generating high levels of lift, and so elevons reduce the maximum lift and efficiency of a wing. These may be used in many unmanned aerial vehicles (UAVs). Two promising approaches are flexible wings, and fluidics.

In flexible wings, much or all of a wing surface can change shape in flight to deflect air flow. The X-53 Active Aeroelastic Wing is a NASA effort. The Adaptive Compliant Wing is a military and commercial effort.

In fluidics, forces in vehicles occur via circulation control, in which larger more complex mechanical parts are replaced by smaller simpler fluidic systems (slots which emit air flows) where larger forces in fluids are diverted by smaller jets or flows of fluid intermittently, to change the direction of vehicles. In this use, fluidics promises lower mass and costs (as little as half), very low inertia and response times, and simplicity.

== See also ==
- Index of aviation articles
- Aileron
- Flaperon
- Delta wing
- Flying wing
- Spoileron
- Stabilator
