= Flaperon =

Aircraft control surface that combines the functions of both flaps and ailerons

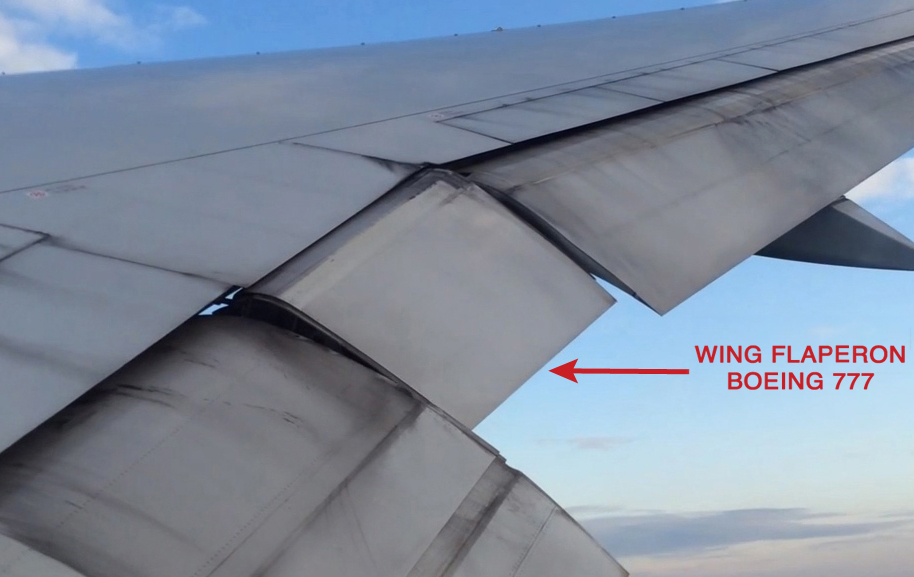
Boeing 777 flaperon

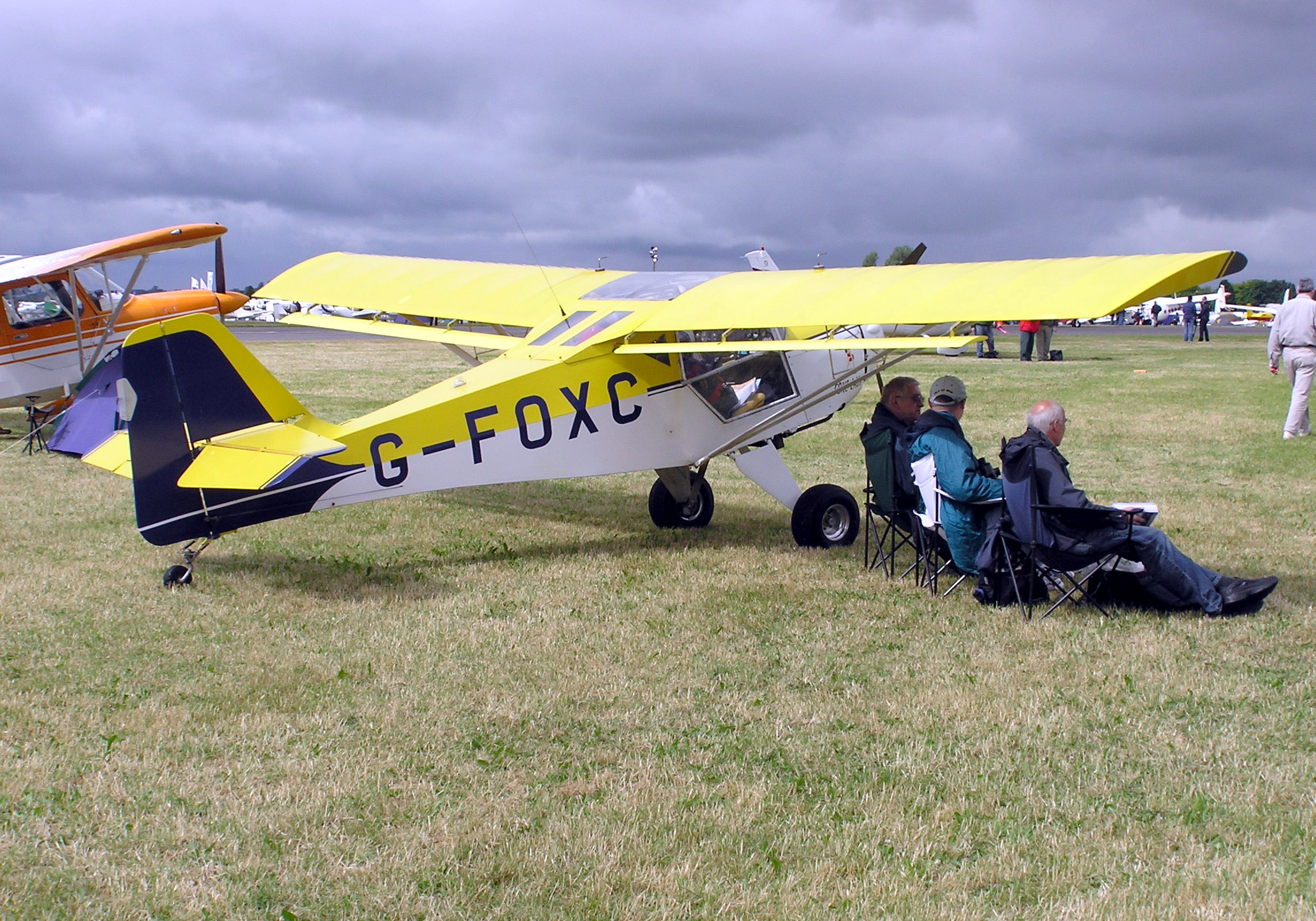
Flaperons on a Denney Kitfox Model 3, built in 1991

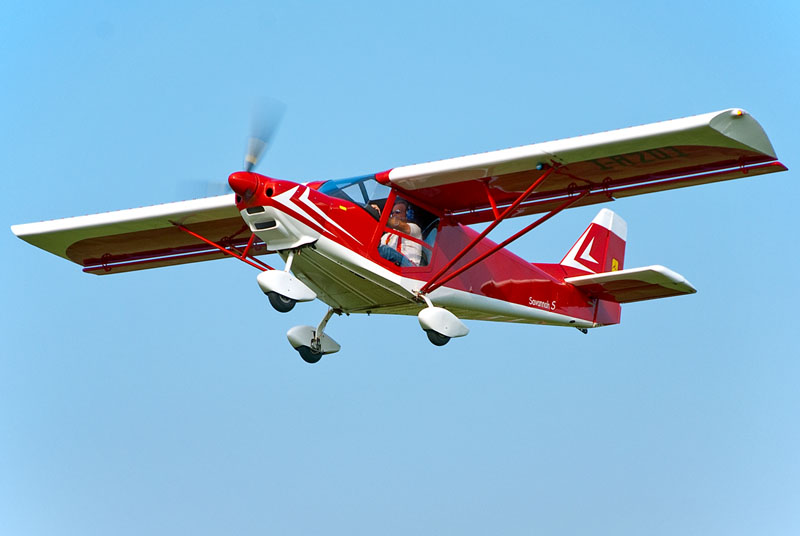
Flaperons (Junkers style) on an ICP Savannah Model S, built in 2010

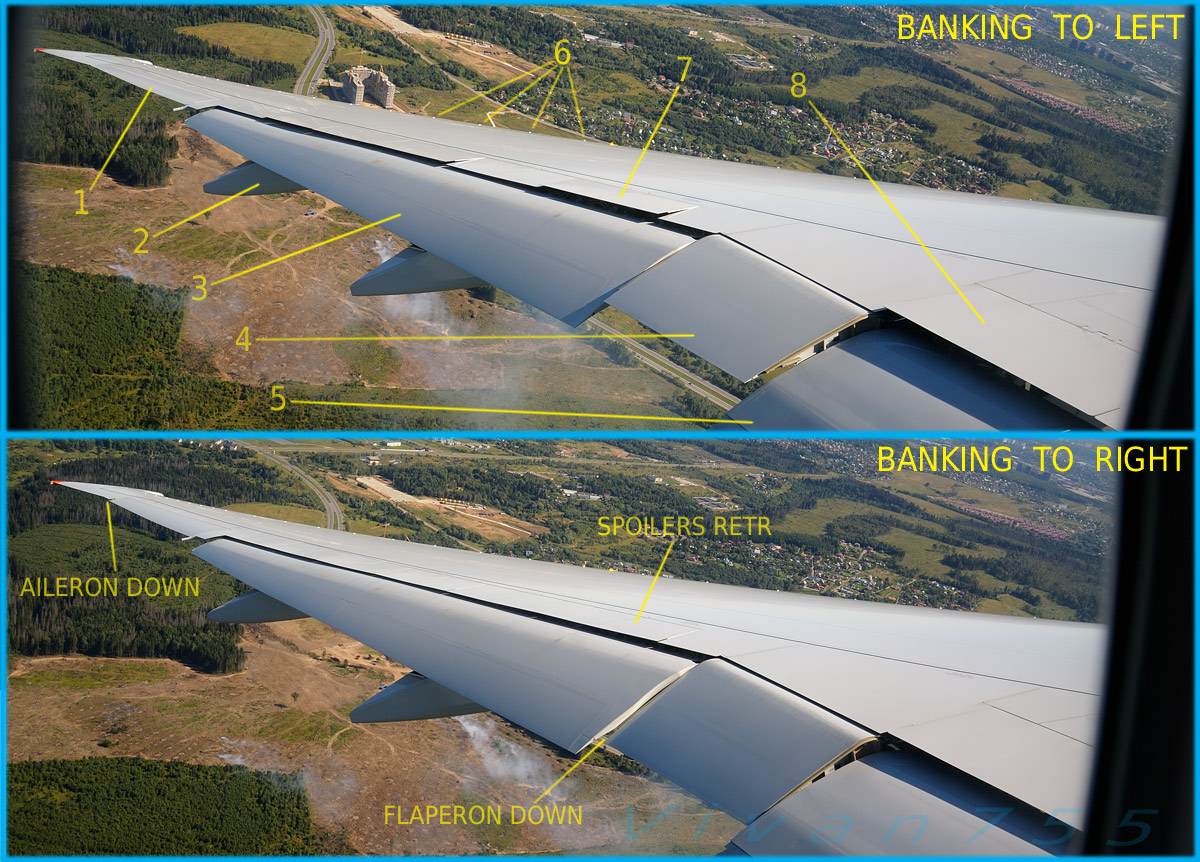
Operation of the flaperon of a Boeing 777 during left and right banking

A flaperon (portmanteau of flap and aileron) on an aircraft wing is a type of control surface that combines the functions of both flaps and ailerons. Some kitplanes have flaperons for simplicity of manufacture, while large commercial aircraft such as the Boeing 747, 767, 777, and 787 may have a flaperon between the flaps and aileron. The 787 has a SpoileFlaperon that combines the action of spoilers, flaps and ailerons into one control surface.

== Operation ==
In addition to controlling the roll or bank of an aircraft, as do conventional ailerons, both flaperons can be lowered together to reduce stall speed, similarly to a set of flaps.

On a plane with flaperons, the pilot still has the standard separate controls for ailerons and flaps, but the flap control also varies the flaperon's range of movement. A mechanical device called a "mixer" is used to combine the pilot's input into the flaperons. While the use of flaperons rather than ailerons and flaps might seem to be a simplification, some complexity remains through the intricacies of the mixer.

Some aircraft, such as the Denney Kitfox, suspend the flaperons below the wing (rather in the manner of slotted flaps) to provide undisturbed airflow at high angles of attack or low airspeeds. When the flaperon surface is hinged below the trailing edge of a wing, they are sometimes named "Junkers flaperons", from the doppelflügel (lit., "double wing") type of trailing edge surfaces used on a number of Junkers aircraft of the 1930s, such as the Junkers Ju 52 airliner, and the iconic Junkers Ju 87 Stuka World War II dive bomber.

== Research ==
Research seeks to coordinate the functions of aircraft flight control surfaces (ailerons, elevators, elevons, flaps, and flaperons) so as to reduce weight, cost, and drag, and thereby achieve improved control response, reduced complexity, and reduced radar visibility for stealth purposes. Beneficiaries of such research might include drones (UAVs) and the latest fighter aircraft.

These research approaches include flexible wings and fluidics:

=== Flexible wings ===
In flexible wings, much or all of a wing surface can change shape in flight to deflect air flow. The X-53 Active Aeroelastic Wing is a NASA effort. The Adaptive Compliant Wing is a military and commercial effort. This may be seen as a return to the wing warping used and patented by the Wright brothers.

=== Fluidics ===
In fluidics, forces in vehicles occur via circulation control, in which larger, more complex mechanical parts are replaced by smaller simpler fluidic systems (slots which emit air flows), where larger forces in fluids are diverted by smaller jets or flows of fluid intermittently, to change the direction of vehicles. In this use, fluidics promises lower mass and costs (as little as half), and response times, as well as simplicity.

== See also ==
- Aileron
- Spoileron
