= Aircraft flight control system =

How aircraft are controlled

A typical aircraft's primary flight controls in motion

A conventional fixed-wing aircraft flight control system consists of flight control surfaces, the respective cockpit controls, connecting linkages, and the necessary operating mechanisms to control an aircraft's direction in flight. Aircraft engine controls are also considered flight controls as they change speed.

The fundamentals of aircraft controls are explained in flight dynamics. This article centers on the operating mechanisms of the flight controls. The basic system in use on aircraft first appeared in a readily recognizable form as early as April 1908, on Louis Blériot's Blériot VIII pioneer-era monoplane design.

== Cockpit controls ==
=== Primary controls ===
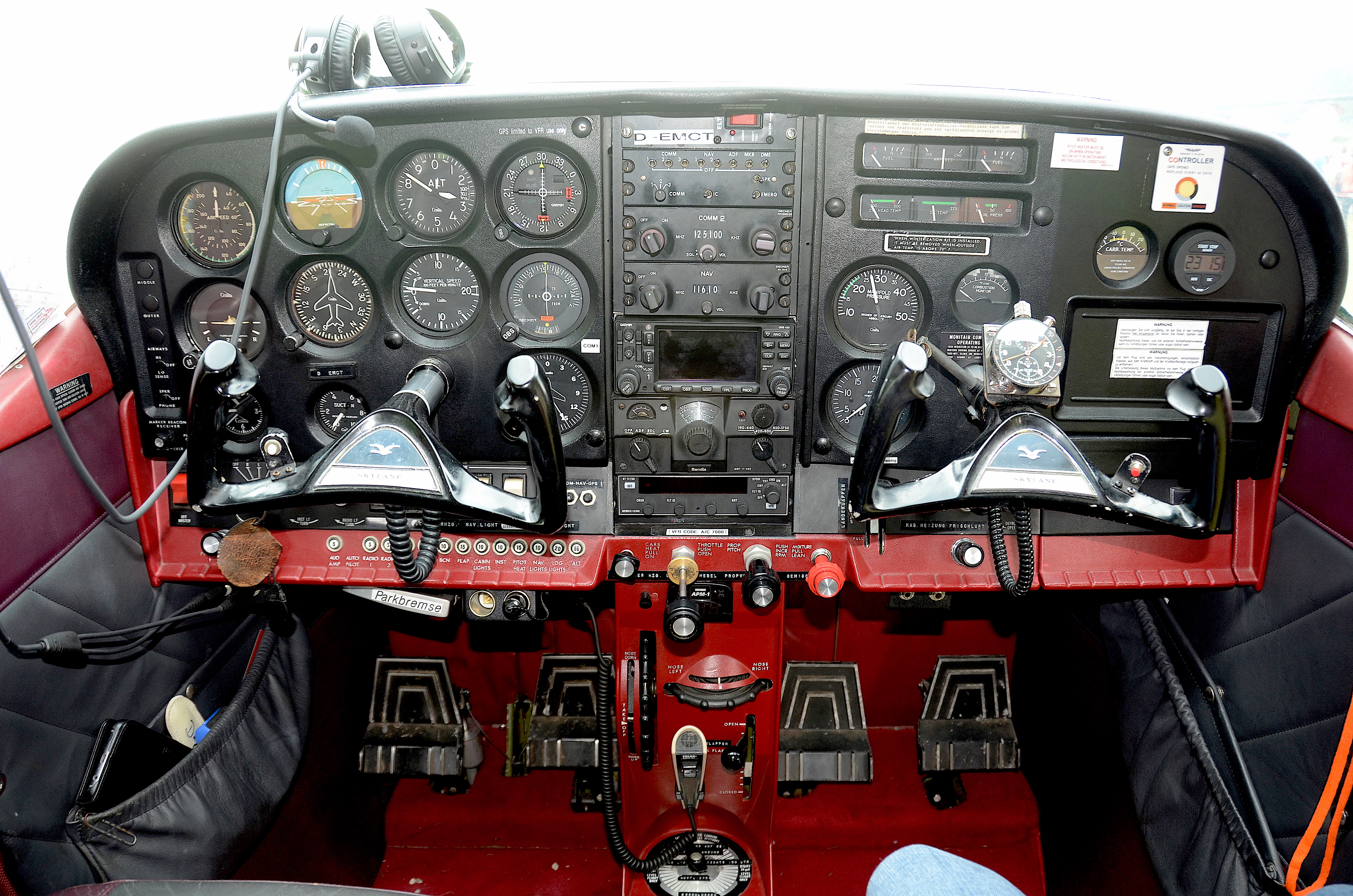
Cockpit controls and instrument panel of a Cessna 182D Skylane

Generally, the primary cockpit flight controls are arranged as follows:

- A control yoke (also known as a control column), centre stick or side-stick (the latter two also colloquially known as a control or joystick), governs the aircraft's roll and pitch by moving the ailerons (or activating wing warping on some very early aircraft designs) when turned or deflected left and right, and moves the elevators when moved backwards or forwards.
- Rudder pedals, or the earlier, pre-1919 "rudder bar", control yaw by moving the rudder; the left foot forward will move the rudder left for instance.
- Thrust lever or throttle, which controls engine speed or thrust for powered aircraft.

The control yokes also vary greatly among aircraft. There are yokes where roll is controlled by rotating the yoke clockwise/counterclockwise (like steering a car) and pitch is controlled by moving the control column towards or away from the pilot, but in others the pitch is controlled by sliding the yoke into and out of the instrument panel (like most Cessnas, such as the 152 and 172), and in some the roll is controlled by sliding the whole yoke to the left and right (like the Cessna 162). Centre sticks also vary between aircraft. Some are directly connected to the control surfaces using cables, others (fly-by-wire airplanes) have a computer in between which then controls the electrical actuators.

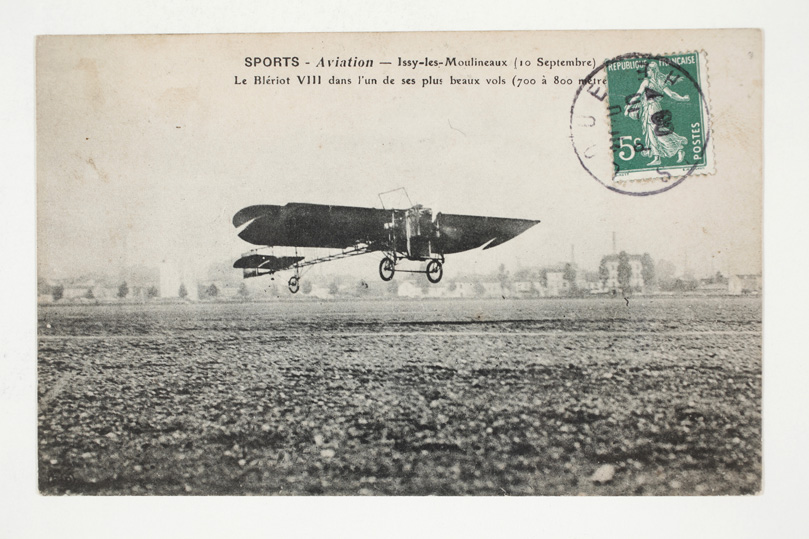
Blériot VIII at Issy-les-Moulineaux, the first flightworthy aircraft design to have the initial form of modern flight controls for the pilot

Even when an aircraft uses variant flight control surfaces such as a V-tail ruddervator, flaperons, or elevons, because these various combined-purpose control surfaces control rotation about the same three axes in space, the aircraft's flight control system will still be designed so that the stick or yoke controls pitch and roll conventionally, as will the rudder pedals for yaw. The basic pattern for modern flight controls was pioneered by French aviation figure Robert Esnault-Pelterie, with fellow French aviator Louis Blériot popularizing Esnault-Pelterie's control format initially on Louis' Blériot VIII monoplane in April 1908, and standardizing the format on the July 1909 Channel-crossing Blériot XI. Flight control has long been taught in such fashion for many decades, as popularized in ab initio instructional books such as the 1944 work Stick and Rudder.

In some aircraft, the control surfaces are not manipulated with a linkage. In ultralight aircraft and motorized hang gliders, for example, there is no mechanism at all. Instead, the pilot just grabs the lifting surface by hand (using a rigid frame that hangs from its underside) and moves it.

=== Secondary controls ===
In addition to the primary flight controls for roll, pitch, and yaw, there are often secondary controls available to give the pilot finer control over flight or to ease the workload. The most commonly available control is a wheel or other device to control elevator trim, so that the pilot does not have to maintain constant backward or forward pressure to hold a specific pitch attitude (other types of trim, for rudder and ailerons, are common on larger aircraft but may also appear on smaller ones). Many aircraft have wing flaps, controlled by a switch or a mechanical lever or in some cases are fully automatic by computer control, which alter the shape of the wing for improved control at the slower speeds used for take-off and landing. Other secondary flight control systems may include slats, spoilers, air brakes and variable-sweep wings.

== Flight control systems ==
=== Mechanical ===
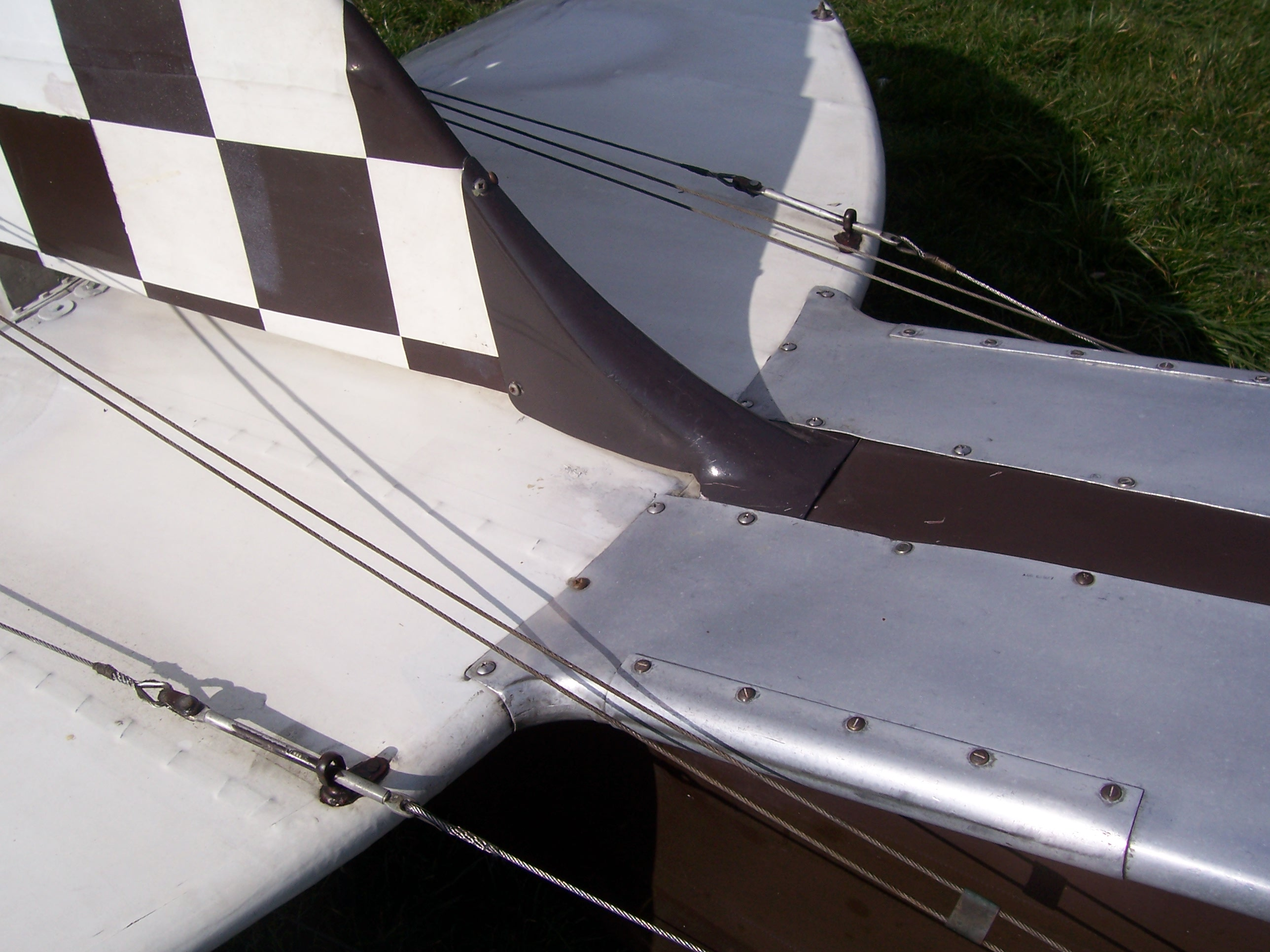
de Havilland Tiger Moth elevator and rudder cables

Mechanical or manually operated flight control systems are the most basic method of controlling an aircraft. They were used in early aircraft and are currently used in small aircraft where the aerodynamic forces are not excessive. Very early aircraft, such as the Wright Flyer I, Blériot XI and Fokker Eindecker used a system of wing warping where no conventionally hinged control surfaces were used on the wing, and sometimes not even for pitch control as on the Wright Flyer I and original versions of the 1909 Etrich Taube, which only had a hinged/pivoting rudder in addition to the warping-operated pitch and roll controls. A manual flight control system uses a collection of mechanical parts such as pushrods, tension cables, pulleys, counterweights, and sometimes chains to transmit the forces applied to the cockpit controls directly to the control surfaces. Turnbuckles are often used to adjust control cable tension. The Cessna Skyhawk is a typical example of an aircraft that uses this type of system. Gust locks are often used on parked aircraft with mechanical systems to protect the control surfaces and linkages from damage from wind. Some aircraft have gust locks fitted as part of the control system.

Increases in the control surface area, and the higher airspeeds required by faster aircraft resulted in higher aerodynamic loads on the flight control systems. As a result, the forces required to move them also become significantly larger. Consequently, complicated mechanical gearing arrangements were developed to extract maximum mechanical advantage in order to reduce the forces required from the pilots. This arrangement can be found on bigger or higher performance propeller aircraft such as the Fokker 50.

Some mechanical flight control systems use servo tabs that provide aerodynamic assistance. Servo tabs are small surfaces hinged to the control surfaces. The flight control mechanisms move these tabs, aerodynamic forces in turn move, or assist the movement of the control surfaces reducing the amount of mechanical forces needed. This arrangement was used in early piston-engined transport aircraft and in early jet transports. The Boeing 737 incorporates a system, whereby in the unlikely event of total hydraulic system failure, it automatically and seamlessly reverts to being controlled via servo-tab.

=== Hydro-mechanical ===
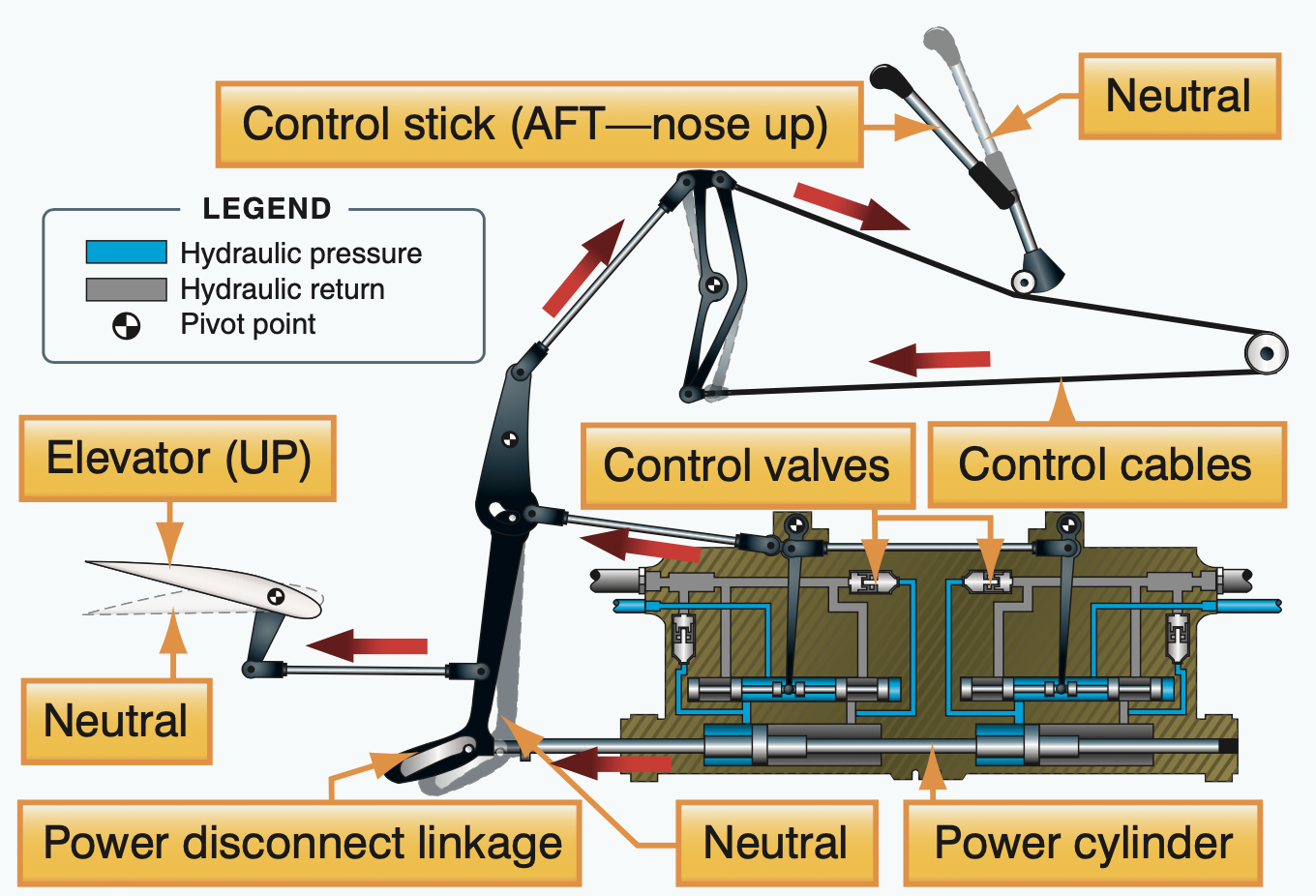
Hydromechanical designs, consisting of a mechanical circuit and a hydraulic circuit, were used to reduce the complexity, weight, and limitations of mechanical flight controls systems.

The complexity and weight of mechanical flight control systems increase considerably with the size and performance of the aircraft. Hydraulically powered control surfaces help to overcome these limitations. With hydraulic flight control systems, the aircraft's size and performance are limited by economics rather than a pilot's muscular strength. At first, only-partially boosted systems were used in which the pilot could still feel some of the aerodynamic loads on the control surfaces (feedback).

A hydro-mechanical flight control system has two parts:

- The mechanical circuit, which links the cockpit controls with the hydraulic circuits. Like the mechanical flight control system, it consists of rods, cables, pulleys, and sometimes chains.
- The hydraulic circuit, which has hydraulic pumps, reservoirs, filters, pipes, valves and actuators. The actuators are powered by the hydraulic pressure generated by the pumps in the hydraulic circuit. The actuators convert hydraulic pressure into control surface movements. The electro-hydraulic servo valves control the movement of the actuators.

The pilot's movement of a control causes the mechanical circuit to open the matching servo valve in the hydraulic circuit. The hydraulic circuit powers the actuators which then move the control surfaces. As the actuator moves, the servo valve is closed by a mechanical feedback linkage - one that stops movement of the control surface at the desired position.

This arrangement was found in the older-designed jet transports and in some high-performance aircraft. Examples include the Antonov An-225 and the Lockheed SR-71.

==== Artificial feel devices ====
With purely mechanical flight control systems, the aerodynamic forces on the control surfaces are transmitted through the mechanisms and are felt directly by the pilot, allowing tactile feedback of airspeed. With hydromechanical flight control systems, the load on the surfaces cannot be felt and there is a risk of overstressing the aircraft through excessive control surface movement. To overcome this problem, artificial feel systems can be used. For example, for the controls of the RAF's Avro Vulcan jet bomber and the RCAF's Avro Canada CF-105 Arrow supersonic interceptor (both 1950s-era designs), the required force feedback was achieved by a spring device. The fulcrum of this device was moved in proportion to the square of the air speed (for the elevators) to give increased resistance at higher speeds. For the controls of the American Vought F-8 Crusader and the LTV A-7 Corsair II warplanes, a 'bob-weight' was used in the pitch axis of the control stick, giving force feedback that was proportional to the airplane's normal acceleration.

==== Stick shaker ====
A stick shaker is a device that is attached to the control column in some hydraulic aircraft. It shakes the control column when the aircraft is approaching stall conditions. Some aircraft such as the McDonnell Douglas DC-10 are equipped with a back-up electrical power supply that can be activated to enable the stick shaker in case of hydraulic failure.

==== Power-by-wire ====
In most current systems the power is provided to the control actuators by high-pressure hydraulic systems. In fly-by-wire systems the valves, which control these systems, are activated by electrical signals. In power-by-wire systems, electrical actuators are used in favour of hydraulic pistons. The power is carried to the actuators by electrical cables. These are lighter than hydraulic pipes, easier to install and maintain, and more reliable. Elements of the F-35 flight control system are power-by-wire. The actuators in such an electro-hydrostatic actuation (EHA) system are self-contained hydraulic devices, small closed-circuit hydraulic systems. The overall aim is towards more- or all-electric aircraft and an early example of the approach was the Avro Vulcan. Serious consideration was given to using the approach on the Airbus A380.

=== Fly-by-wire control systems ===
A fly-by-wire (FBW) system replaces manual flight control of an aircraft with an electronic interface. The movements of flight controls are converted to electronic signals transmitted by wires (hence the term fly-by-wire), and flight control computers determine how to move the actuators at each control surface to provide the expected response. Commands from the computers are also input without the pilot's knowledge to stabilize the aircraft and perform other tasks. Electronics for aircraft flight control systems are part of the field known as avionics.

Fly-by-optics, also known as fly-by-light, is a further development using fiber-optic cables.

== Research ==
Several technology research and development efforts exist to integrate the functions of flight control systems such as ailerons, elevators, elevons, flaps, and flaperons into wings to perform the aerodynamic purpose with the advantages of less: mass, cost, drag, inertia (for faster, stronger control response), complexity (mechanically simpler, fewer moving parts or surfaces, less maintenance), and radar cross section for stealth. These may be used in many unmanned aerial vehicles (UAVs) and 6th generation fighter aircraft. Two promising approaches are flexible wings, and fluidics.

=== Flexible wings ===
In flexible wings, also known as "morphing aerofoils", much or all of a wing surface can change shape in flight to deflect air flow much like an ornithopter. Adaptive compliant wings are a military and commercial effort. The X-53 Active Aeroelastic Wing was a US Air Force, NASA, and Boeing effort. Notable efforts have also been made by FlexSys, who have conducted flight tests using flexible aerofoils retrofitted to a Gulf stream III aircraft.

=== Active Flow Control ===
In active flow control systems, forces in vehicles occur via circulation control, in which larger and more complex mechanical parts are replaced by smaller, simpler fluidic systems (slots which emit air flows) where larger forces in fluids are diverted by smaller jets or flows of fluid intermittently, to change the direction of vehicles. In this use, active flow control promises simplicity and lower mass, costs (up to half less), and inertia and response times. This was demonstrated in the Demon UAV, which flew for the first time in the UK in September 2010.

== See also ==
- Dual control (aviation)
- Flight envelope protection
- Flight with disabled controls
- Helicopter flight controls
- HOTAS
- Kite control systems
- List of airliner crashes involving loss of control
- Matthew Piers Watt Boulton, inventor of the aileron (1868)
- Thrust vectoring
- Weight-shift control
- Wing warping, an early method for controlling roll
