= Long axis =

Long axis may refer to:

- Long axis of organs in anatomy
- Longitudinal axis of flight control surfaces
