= Spoileron =

Lift spoilers that can be used as flight control devices

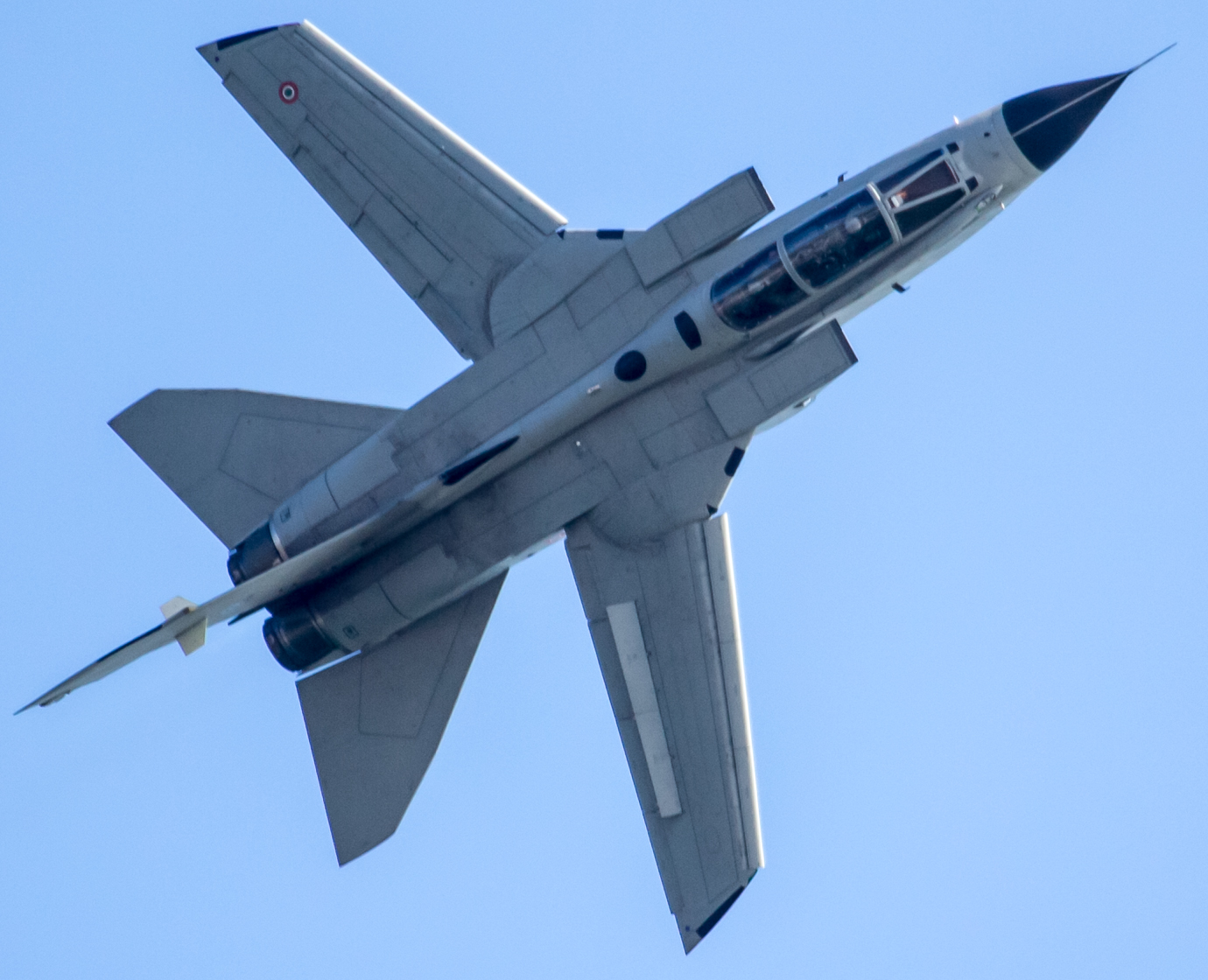
Italian Air Force Tornado with a spoileron deployed

In aeronautics, spoilerons (also known as spoiler ailerons or roll spoilers) are spoilers that can be used asymmetrically as flight control surfaces to provide roll control.

== Operation ==
Spoilerons roll an aircraft by reducing the lift of the downward-going wing. Unlike ailerons, spoilers do not increase the lift and drag of the upward-going wing. A raised spoileron increases the drag on the down-going wing where it is deployed, causing the aircraft to yaw in the direction of the turn. Spoilerons can be used to assist ailerons or to replace them entirely, as in the B-52G which required an extra spoiler segment in place of ailerons present on other B-52 models.

== Purpose ==
Spoilerons do not cause adverse yaw, unlike ailerons.

They are used in situations where aileron action would produce excessive wing twist on a very flexible wing or if wide-span flaps prevent adequate aileron roll control.

They can also be used as spoilers.

The Mitsubishi MU-2 has double-slotted flaps that take-up the full length of the wing, to achieve good STOL performance. This leaves no room for ailerons, so it uses spoilerons instead.

Spoilerons can be used during a stall, whereas ailerons must not be used in a stall because they will have the opposite to intended effect.

== Disadvantages ==
Spoilerons reduce lift, increasing fuel usage. The lift reduction can be a problem in a one-engine-inoperative situation.

== Examples ==
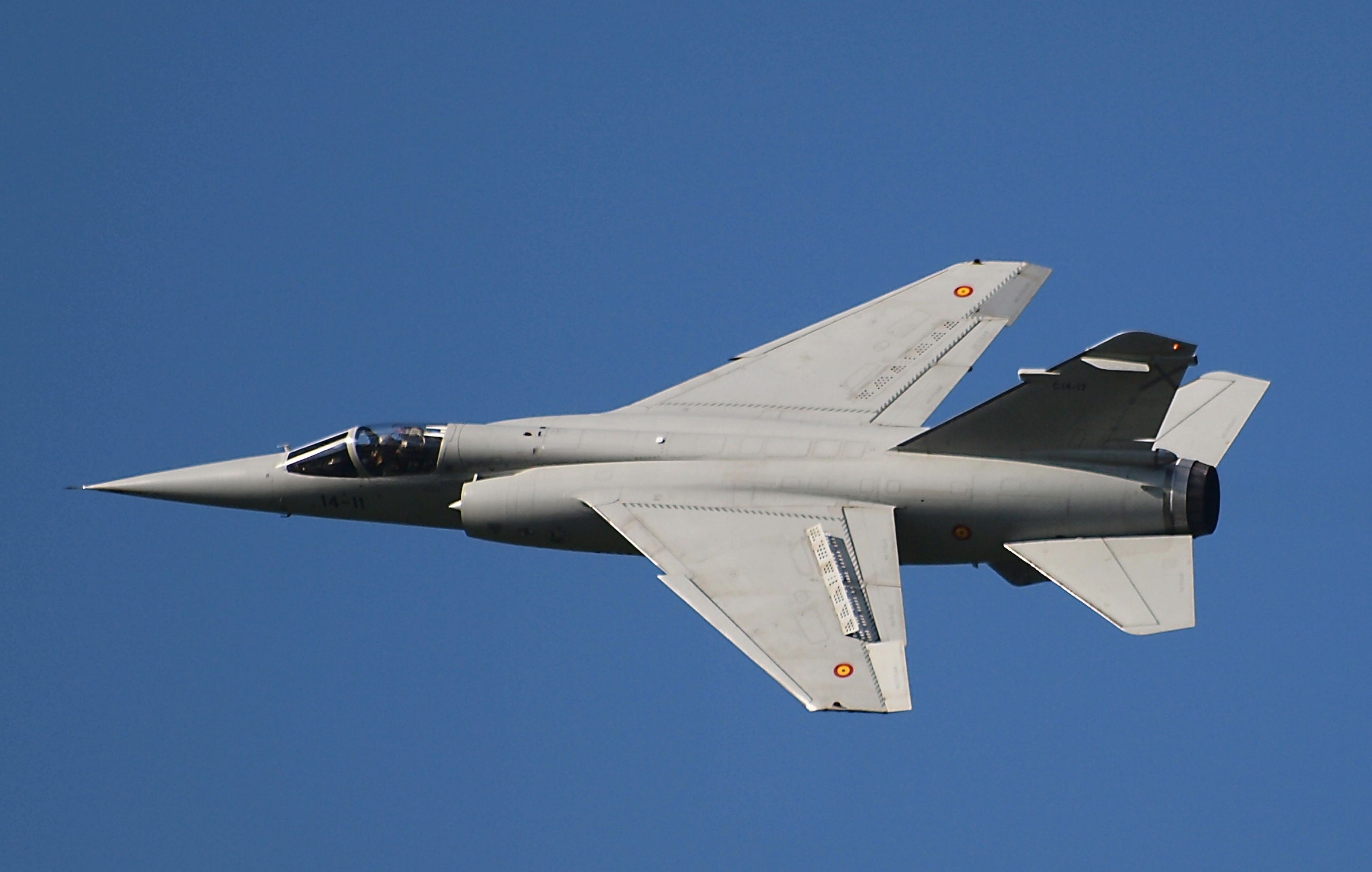
Dassault Mirage F1 with spoileron deployed

An early use of spoilers augmenting small ailerons, known as guide ailerons, was in the Northrop P-61 Black Widow night fighter. The spoilers allowed wider-span flaps for a lower landing speed.

The B-52 Stratofortress also had spoilers augmenting small ailerons, known as feeler ailerons. These ailerons provided control forces to the pilot. The B-52G/H has no ailerons. The spoilers, situated inboard and forward of the trailing edge, are used for lateral control at high speeds to prevent excessive wing twist.

The Mitsubishi Diamond Jet, Beechjet, and Hawker 400 family of business aircraft incorporate full length spoilerons that also double as speed spoilers during flight and landing.

Another aircraft with full-length double-slotted flaps was the Wren 460. To go with large aileron deflections at low speeds it had a set of five feathering drag plates ahead of each aileron to overcome adverse aileron yaw and decrease lift on the low wing.

Boeing's line of jet airliners have flight spoilers which can act as roll spoilers. They are activated automatically when the control wheel is displaced more than 10 degrees.

The Tupolev Tu-154 have fast-acting spoilers. They double as spoilerons that assist the ailerons when the pilot commands a high roll rate. These can be observed in operation when the pilot is fighting gusting crosswinds while landing.

== See also ==
- Flight control surfaces
- Flaperon
- Elevon
