= Parker variable wing =

Type of wing for biplanes or triplanes

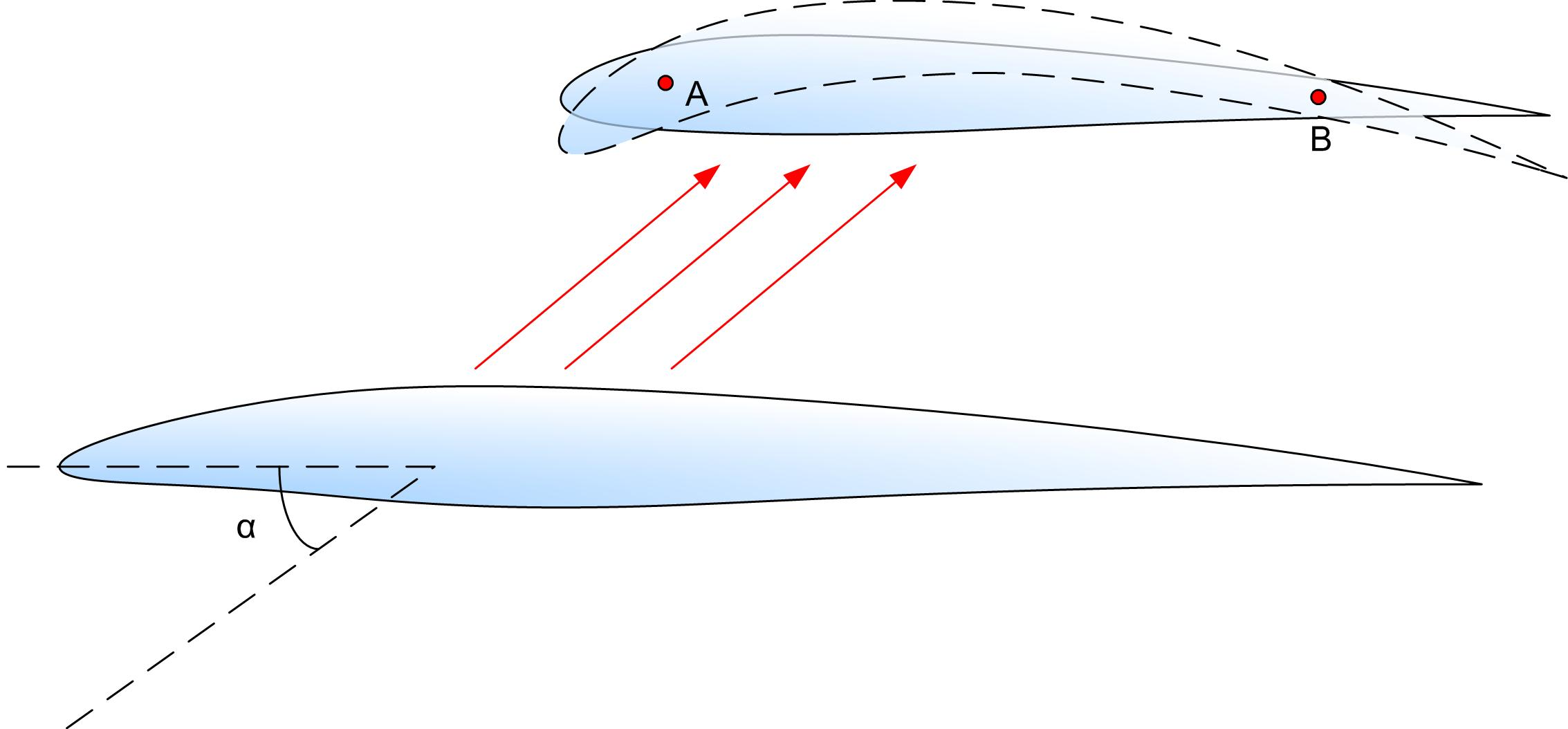
Parker Variable wing

The Parker variable wing is a wing configuration in biplane or triplane aircraft designed by H.F. Parker in 1920. His design allows a supplement in lift while landing or taking-off. The system is depicted in the figure. The figure shows the biplane configuration. The lower airfoil is rigid. The upper airfoil is flexible. At high angle of attack the flow over the lower airfoil will cause the airflow to bend up and create an upward force at the lower surface of the upper airfoil. This upward force will cause the flexible section to be pushed upward. The flexible wing section is held at points A and B. The trailing edge is rigid and can rotate about point B. Due to this effect the camber of the airfoil is increased, and hence the lift it creates is increased.

== See also ==
- Aeroelasticity
- X-53 Active Aeroelastic Wing
- Adaptive compliant wing
