= Adverse yaw =

Tendency for an aircraft to yaw opposite to a roll

Adverse yaw is the natural and undesirable tendency for an aircraft to yaw in the opposite direction of a roll. It is caused by the difference in lift and drag of each wing. The effect can be greatly minimized with ailerons deliberately designed to create drag when deflected upward and/or mechanisms which automatically apply some amount of coordinated rudder. As the major causes of adverse yaw vary with lift, any fixed-ratio mechanism will fail to fully solve the problem across all flight conditions and thus any manually operated aircraft will require some amount of rudder input from the pilot in order to maintain coordinated flight.

== History ==
Adverse yaw was first experienced by the Wright brothers when they were unable to perform controlled turns in their 1901 glider which had no vertical control surface. Orville Wright later described the glider's lack of directional control.

== Causes ==
Adverse yaw is a secondary effect of the inclination of the lift vectors on the wing due to its rolling velocity and of the application of the ailerons. Some pilot training manuals focus mainly on the additional drag caused by the downward-deflected aileron and make only brief or indirect mentions of roll effects. In fact the rolling of the wings usually causes a greater effect than the ailerons. Assuming a roll rate to the right, as in the diagram, the causes are explained as follows:

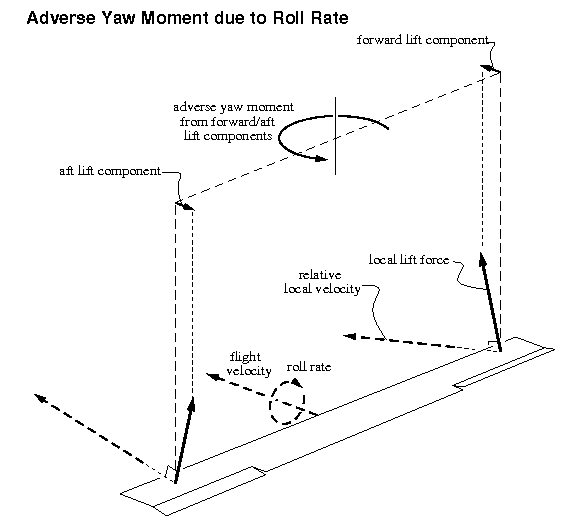

=== Lift vector deflection during rolling ===
During a positive rolling motion, the left wing moves upward. If an aircraft were somehow suspended in air with no motion other than a positive roll, then from the point of view of the left wing, air will be coming from above and striking the upper surface of the wing. Thus, the left wing will experience a small amount of oncoming airflow merely from the rolling motion. This can be conceptualized as a vector originating from the left wing and pointing towards the oncoming air during the positive roll, i.e. perpendicularly upwards from the left wing's surface. If this positive-rolling aircraft were additionally moving forward in flight, then the vector pointing towards the oncoming air will be mostly forward due to forward-moving flight, but also slightly upward due to the rolling motion. This is the dashed vector coming from the left wing in the diagram.

Thus, for the left wing of a forward-moving aircraft, a positive roll causes the oncoming air to be deflected slightly upwards. Equivalently, the left wing's effective angle of attack is decreased due to the positive roll. By definition, lift is perpendicular to the oncoming flow. The upward deflection of oncoming air causes the lift vector to be deflected backward. Conversely, as the right wing descends, its vector pointing towards the oncoming air is deflected downward and its lift vector is deflected forward. The backward deflection of lift for the left wing and the forward deflection of lift for the right wing results in an adverse yaw moment to the left, opposite to the intended right turn. This adverse yaw moment is present only while the aircraft is rolling relative to the surrounding air, and disappears when the aircraft's bank angle is steady.

=== Induced drag ===
Initiating a roll to the right requires a briefly greater lift on the left than the right. This also causes a greater induced drag on the left than the right, which further adds to the adverse yaw, but only briefly. Once a steady roll rate is established the left/right lift imbalance dwindles, while the other mechanisms described above persist.

=== Profile drag ===
The downward aileron deflection on the left increases the airfoil camber, which will typically increase the profile drag. Conversely, the upward aileron deflection on the right will decrease the camber and profile drag. The profile drag imbalance adds to the adverse yaw. A Frise aileron reduces this imbalance drag, as described further below.

== Minimizing the adverse yaw ==
There are a number of aircraft design characteristics which can be used to reduce adverse yaw to ease the pilot workload:

=== Yaw stability ===
A strong directional stability is the first way to reduce adverse yaw. This is influenced by the vertical tail moment (area and lever arm about gravity center).

=== Lift coefficient ===
As the tilting of the left/right lift vectors is the major cause to adverse yaw, an important parameter is the magnitude of these lift vectors, or the aircraft's lift coefficient to be more specific. Flight at low lift coefficient (or high speed compared to minimum speed) produces less adverse yaw.

=== Aileron to rudder mixing ===
As intended, the rudder is the most powerful and efficient means of managing yaw but mechanically coupling it to the ailerons is impractical. Electronic coupling is commonplace in fly-by-wire aircraft.

=== Differential aileron deflection ===
Illustration of a Differential aileron

The geometry of most aileron linkages can be configured so as to bias the travel further upward than downward. By excessively deflecting the upward aileron, profile drag is increased rather than reduced and separation drag further aids in producing drag on the inside wing, producing a yaw force in the direction of the turn. Though not as efficient as rudder mixing, aileron differential is very easy to implement on almost any airplane and offers the significant advantage of reducing the tendency for the wing to stall at the tip first by limiting the downward aileron deflection and its associated effective increase in angle of attack.

Most airplanes use this method of adverse yaw mitigation — particularly noticeable on one of the first well-known aircraft to ever use them, the de Havilland Tiger Moth training biplane of the 1930s — due to the simple implementation and safety benefits.

=== Frise ailerons ===
Illustration of a Frise aileron

Frise ailerons are designed so that when up aileron is applied, some of the forward edge of the aileron will protrude downward into the airflow, causing increased drag on this (down-going) wing. This will counter the drag produced by the other aileron, thus reducing adverse yaw.

Unfortunately, as well as reducing adverse yaw, Frise ailerons will increase the overall drag of the aircraft much more than applying rudder correction. Therefore, they are less popular in aircraft where minimizing drag is important (e.g. in a glider).

Note: Frise ailerons were primarily designed to reduce roll control forces. Contrary to the illustration, the aileron leading edge is in fact rounded to prevent flow separation and flutter at negative deflections. That prevents important differential drag forces.

=== Roll spoilers ===
On large aircraft where rudder use is inappropriate at high speeds or ailerons are too small at low speeds, roll spoilers (also called spoilerons) can be used to minimise adverse yaw or increase roll moment. To function as a lateral control, the spoiler is raised on the down-going wing (up aileron) and remains retracted on the other wing. The raised spoiler increases the drag, and so the yaw is in the same direction as the roll.

== References and notes ==
Collection of balanced-aileron test data, F.M. Rogallo, Naca WR-L 419
