= High Alpha Research Vehicle =

Experimental aircraft based on the McDonnell Douglas F-18 Hornet

F-18 High Alpha Research Vehicle (HARV)
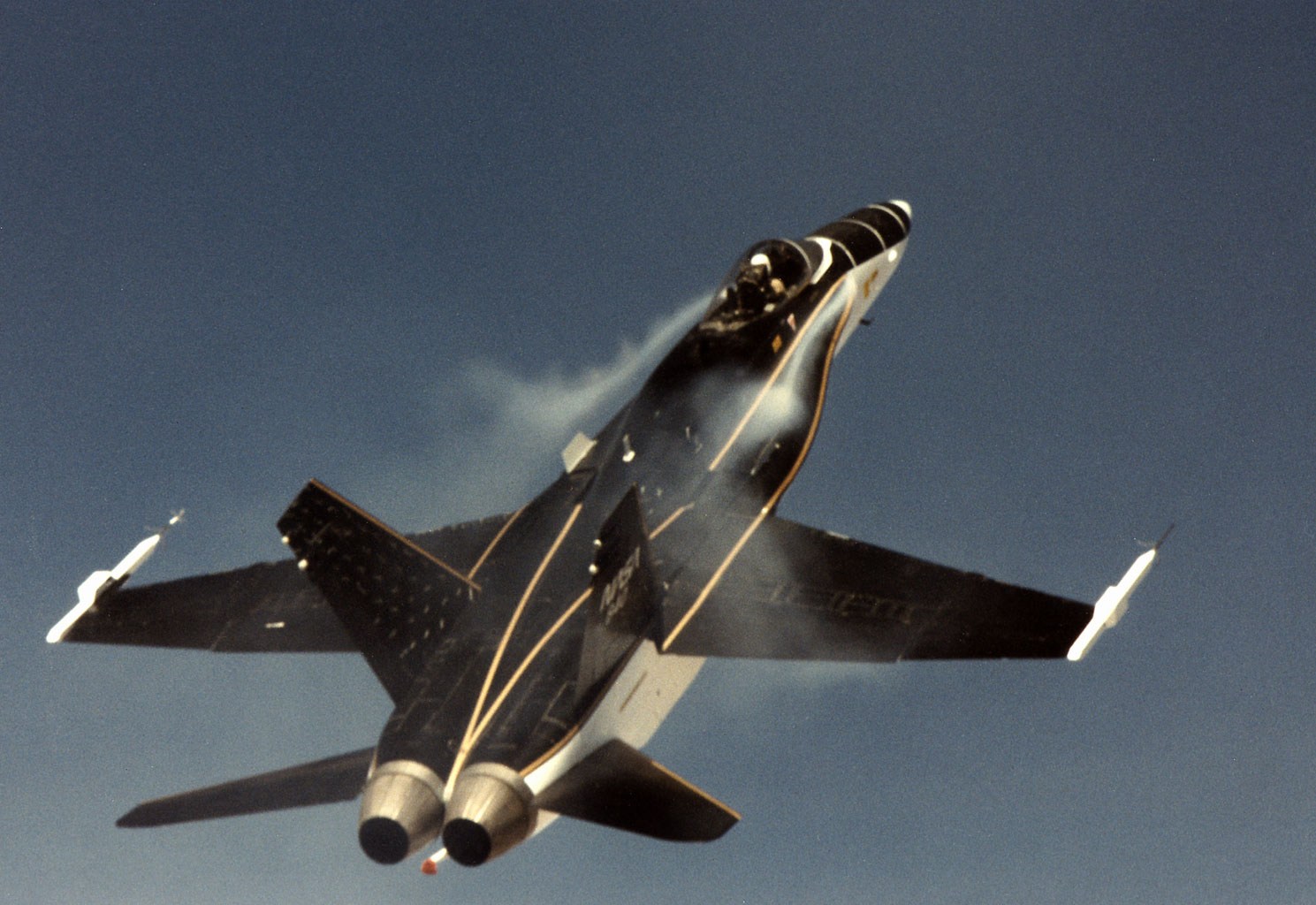
- F-18 HARV in high alpha maneuver

General information
- Type: Test aircraft
- Manufacturer: McDonnell Douglas
- Status: Prototype from military service
- Primary user: NASA
- Number built: 1

History
- Developed from: McDonnell Douglas F/A-18 Hornet

The High Alpha Research Vehicle is a modified American McDonnell Douglas F/A-18 Hornet used by NASA in a three-phase program investigating controlled flight at high alpha (angle of attack) using thrust vectoring, modifications to the flight controls, and with actuated forebody strakes. The program lasted from April 1987 to September 1996.

NASA reported that in one phase of the project, Armstrong Flight Research Center "research pilots William H. "Bill" Dana and Ed Schneider completed the envelope expansion flights in February 1992. Demonstrated capabilities included stable flight at approximately 70 degrees angle of attack (previous maximum was 55 degrees) and rolling at high rates at 65 degrees angle of attack. Controlled rolling would have been nearly impossible above 35 degrees without vectoring." Performance figures were not listed for other phases.

The aircraft is now on display at the Virginia Air and Space Center in Hampton, Virginia.

== See also ==
- List of experimental aircraft
- List of military aircraft of the United States
- Boeing X-53 Active Aeroelastic Wing
