= Flight control surfaces =

Surface that allows a pilot to adjust and control an aircraft's flight attitude

Primary aircraft control surfaces and motion: A. Aileron B. Control stick C. Elevator D. Rudder

Flight control surfaces are aerodynamic devices allowing a pilot to adjust and control the aircraft's flight attitude. The primary function of these is to control the aircraft's movement along the three axes of rotation. Flight control surfaces are generally operated by dedicated aircraft flight control systems.

Development of an effective set of flight control surfaces was a critical advance in the history of development of aircraft. Early efforts at fixed-wing aircraft design succeeded in generating sufficient lift to get the aircraft off the ground, however with limited control. The development of effective flight controls allowed stable flight.

A conventional fixed-wing aircraft uses three primary flight control surfaces– aileron, rudder and elevator to control the roll, yaw, and pitch respectively. Secondary flight control surfaces might include spoiler, flaps, and slats on the wings. The main control surfaces of a fixed-wing aircraft are attached to the airframe in such a way that they can perform the intended range of motion. These usually work by deflecting the air stream passing over them, to create the intended effect.

Certain fixed-wing aircraft configurations may use different control surfaces however the basic principles remain. For other airborne vehicles, these vary depending on the controls required. For rotary wing aircraft such as a helicopter, the stick and the rudder is used to accomplish the same motions about the three principal axes and the rotating flight controls such as main rotor and tail rotor disks. Certain elements are considered as a generalized fluid control surface, such as the rudders, which are shared between aircraft and watercraft.

== Development ==
The Wright brothers are credited with developing the first practical control surfaces, registered as a part of their patent on flying. While elevator and rudder were used to control the pitch and the yaw, early aircraft had trouble controlling the roll of the flight. The Wright brothers used wing warping, a technique where the outer trailing edges of the wing were manipulated to control the roll. However, this technique put additional pressure on the wings, making it more prone to structural failure. In an attempt to circumvent the Wrights' patent, Glenn Curtiss developed hinged movable surfaces called ailerons, attached to the wings, which helped controlling the roll of the aircraft. These hinged control surfaces have the advantage of not causing stresses that are a problem of wing warping and are easier to build into structures, and have since become a standard in fixed wing aircraft.

== Axes of motion ==
Rotation around the three axes

An aircraft is free to rotate around three axes that are perpendicular to each other and intersect at its center of gravity. To control position and direction, a pilot is required to be able to control rotation about each of them. These axes move with the aircraft and change relative to the earth as the aircraft moves. For example, for an aircraft whose left wing is pointing straight down, its "vertical" axis is parallel with the ground, while its "transverse" axis is perpendicular to the ground.

- Transverse axis or lateral axis passes through an aircraft from wingtip to wingtip, and rotation about this axis is called pitch. Pitch changes the vertical direction that the aircraft's nose is pointing. Elevators are the primary flight control surfaces used to control the pitch.
- Longitudinal axis passes through the aircraft from nose to tail, and the rotation about this axis is termed as roll. The angular displacement about this axis is called bank. The bank angle can be changed by applying differential lift to each of the wings. The ailerons are the primary control surfaces to effect this, while spoilerons on the upper wing surface aids rolling in larger aircraft. The rudder also has a secondary effect on bank through moving one wing forward and the other backwards, affecting the lift they produce.
- Vertical axis passes through an aircraft from top to bottom, and the rotation about this axis is called yaw. Yaw changes the direction the aircraft's nose is pointing, and is primarily controlled by the rudder. Ailerons also have a secondary effect on yaw as the wing with more lift experiences more drag.

== Main control surfaces ==
The main control surfaces of a fixed-wing aircraft are attached to the airframe on hinges or tracks so they may move and thus deflect the air stream passing over them. This redirection of the air stream generates an unbalanced force to rotate the plane about the associated axis.

Flight control surfaces of Boeing 727

=== Ailerons ===
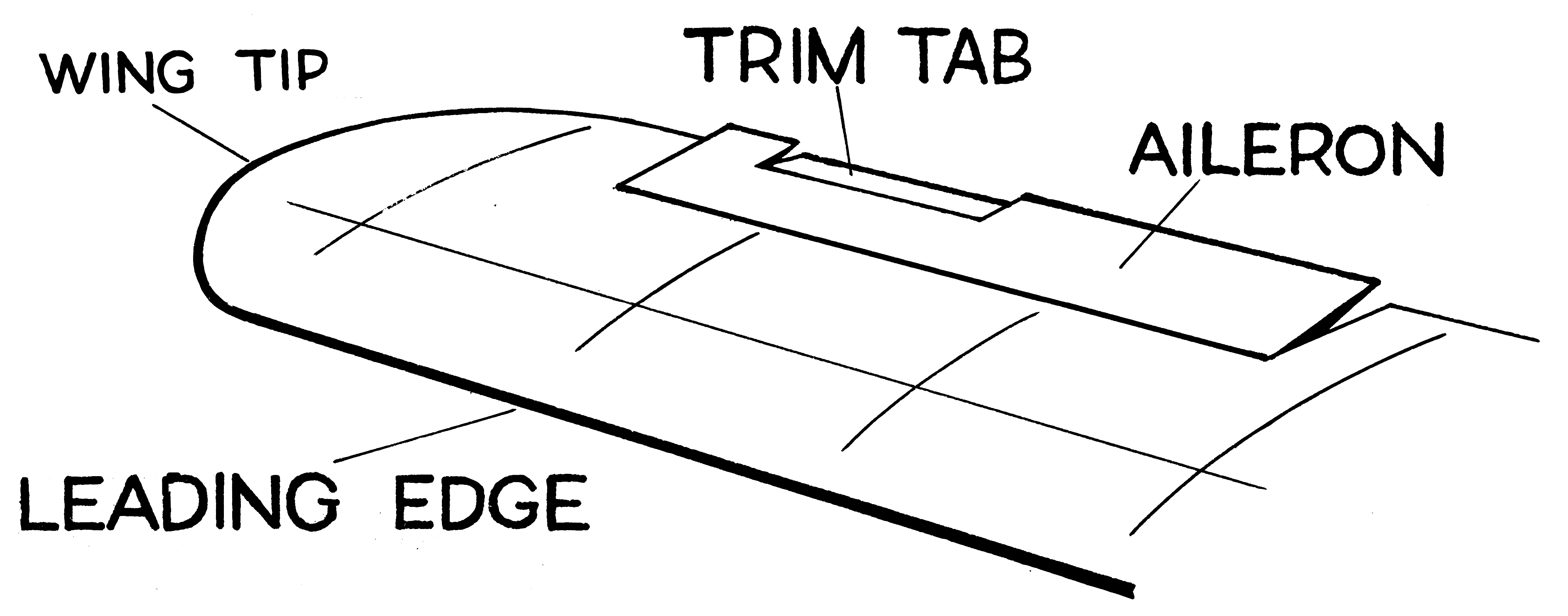
Aileron surface

Ailerons are mounted on the trailing edge of each wing near the wingtips and move in opposite directions. When the pilot moves the aileron control to the left, or turns the wheel counter-clockwise, the left aileron goes up and the right aileron goes down. A raised aileron reduces lift on that wing and a lowered one increases lift, so moving the aileron control in this way causes the left wing to drop and the right wing to rise. This causes the aircraft to roll to the left and begin to turn to the left. Centering the control returns the ailerons to the neutral position, maintaining the bank angle. The aircraft will continue to turn until opposite aileron motion returns the bank angle to zero to fly straight.

=== Elevator ===
The elevator is a moveable part of the horizontal stabilizer, hinged to the back of the fixed part of the horizontal tail. The elevators move up and down together. When the pilot pulls the stick backward, the elevators go up. Pushing the stick forward causes the elevators to go down. Raised elevators push down on the tail and cause the nose to pitch up. This makes the wings fly at a higher angle of attack, which generates more lift and more drag. Centering the stick returns the elevators to neutral and stops the change of pitch. Some aircraft, such as an MD-80, use a servo tab within the elevator surface to aerodynamically move the main surface into position. The direction of travel of the control tab will thus be in a direction opposite to the main control surface. It is for this reason that an MD-80 tail looks like it has a 'split' elevator system.

In the canard arrangement, the elevators are hinged to the rear of a foreplane and move in the opposite sense, for example when the pilot pulls the stick back the elevators go down to increase the lift at the front and lift the nose up.

=== Rudder ===
The rudder is typically mounted on the trailing edge of the vertical stabilizer, part of the empennage. When the pilot pushes the left pedal, the rudder deflects left. Pushing the right pedal causes the rudder to deflect right. Deflecting the rudder right pushes the tail left and causes the nose to yaw to the right. Centering the rudder pedals returns the rudder to neutral and stops the yaw.

=== Secondary effects of controls ===
==== Ailerons ====
The ailerons primarily cause roll. Whenever lift is increased, induced drag is also increased so when the aileron control is moved to roll the aircraft to the left, the right aileron is lowered which increases lift on the right wing and therefore increases induced drag on the right wing. Using ailerons causes adverse yaw, meaning the nose of the aircraft yaws in a direction opposite to the aileron application. When moving the aileron control to bank the wings to the left, adverse yaw moves the nose of the aircraft to the right. Adverse yaw is most pronounced in low-speed aircraft with long wings, such as gliders. It is counteracted by the pilot using the rudder pedals. Differential ailerons are ailerons which have been rigged such that the downgoing aileron deflects less than the upward-moving one, causing less adverse yaw.

==== Rudder ====
The rudder is a fundamental control surface which is typically controlled by pedals rather than at the stick. It is the primary means of controlling yaw—the rotation of an airplane about its vertical axis. The rudder may also be called upon to counter-act the adverse yaw produced by the roll-control surfaces.

If rudder is continuously applied in level flight the aircraft will yaw initially in the direction of the applied rudder – the primary effect of rudder. After a few seconds the aircraft will tend to bank in the direction of yaw. This arises initially from the increased speed of the wing opposite to the direction of yaw and the reduced speed of the other wing. The faster wing generates more lift and so rises, while the other wing tends to go down because of generating less lift. Continued application of rudder sustains rolling tendency because the aircraft flying at an angle to the airflow - skidding towards the forward wing. When applying right rudder in an aircraft with dihedral the left hand wing will have increased angle of attack and the right hand wing will have decreased angle of attack which will result in a roll to the right. An aircraft with anhedral will show the opposite effect. This effect of the rudder is commonly used in model aircraft where if sufficient dihedral or polyhedral is included in the wing design, primary roll control such as ailerons may be omitted altogether.

=== Turning the aircraft ===
Unlike turning a boat, changing the direction of an aircraft normally must be done with the ailerons rather than the rudder. The rudder turns (yaws) the aircraft but has little effect on its direction of travel. With aircraft, the change in direction is caused by the horizontal component of lift, acting on the wings. The pilot tilts the lift force, which is perpendicular to the wings, in the direction of the intended turn by rolling the aircraft into the turn. As the bank angle is increased, the lifting force can be split into two components: one acting vertically and one acting horizontally.

If the total lift is kept constant, the vertical component of lift will decrease. As the weight of the aircraft is unchanged, this would result in the aircraft descending if not countered. To maintain level flight requires increased positive (up) elevator to increase the angle of attack, increase the total lift generated and keep the vertical component of lift equal with the weight of the aircraft. This cannot continue indefinitely. The total load factor required to maintain level flight is directly related to the bank angle. This means that for a given airspeed, level flight can only be maintained up to a certain given angle of bank. Beyond this angle of bank, the aircraft will suffer an accelerated stall if the pilot attempts to generate enough lift to maintain level flight.

=== Alternate main control surfaces ===
Some aircraft configurations have non-standard primary controls. For example, instead of elevators at the back of the stabilizers, the entire tailplane may change angle. Some aircraft have a tail in the shape of a V, and the moving parts at the back of those combine the functions of elevators and rudder. Delta wing aircraft may have "elevons" at the back of the wing, which combine the functions of elevators and ailerons.

== Secondary control surfaces ==
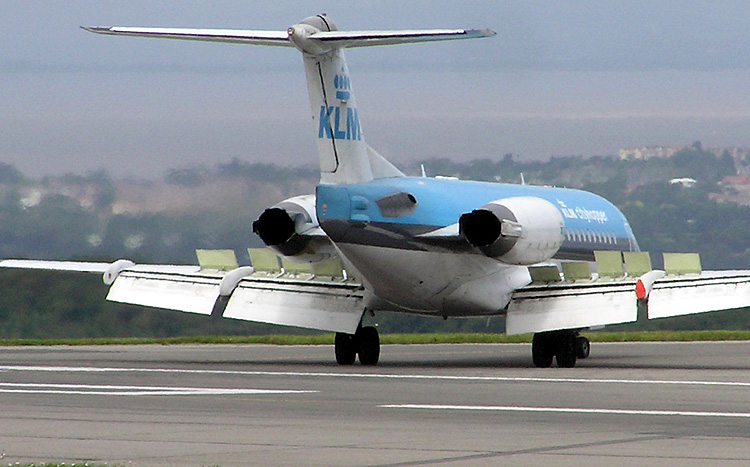
KLM Fokker 70, showing position of flap and liftdumper flight controls. The liftdumpers are the lifted cream-coloured panels on the wing upper surface (in this picture there are five on the right wing). The flaps are the large drooped surfaces on the trailing edge of the wing.

=== Spoilers ===
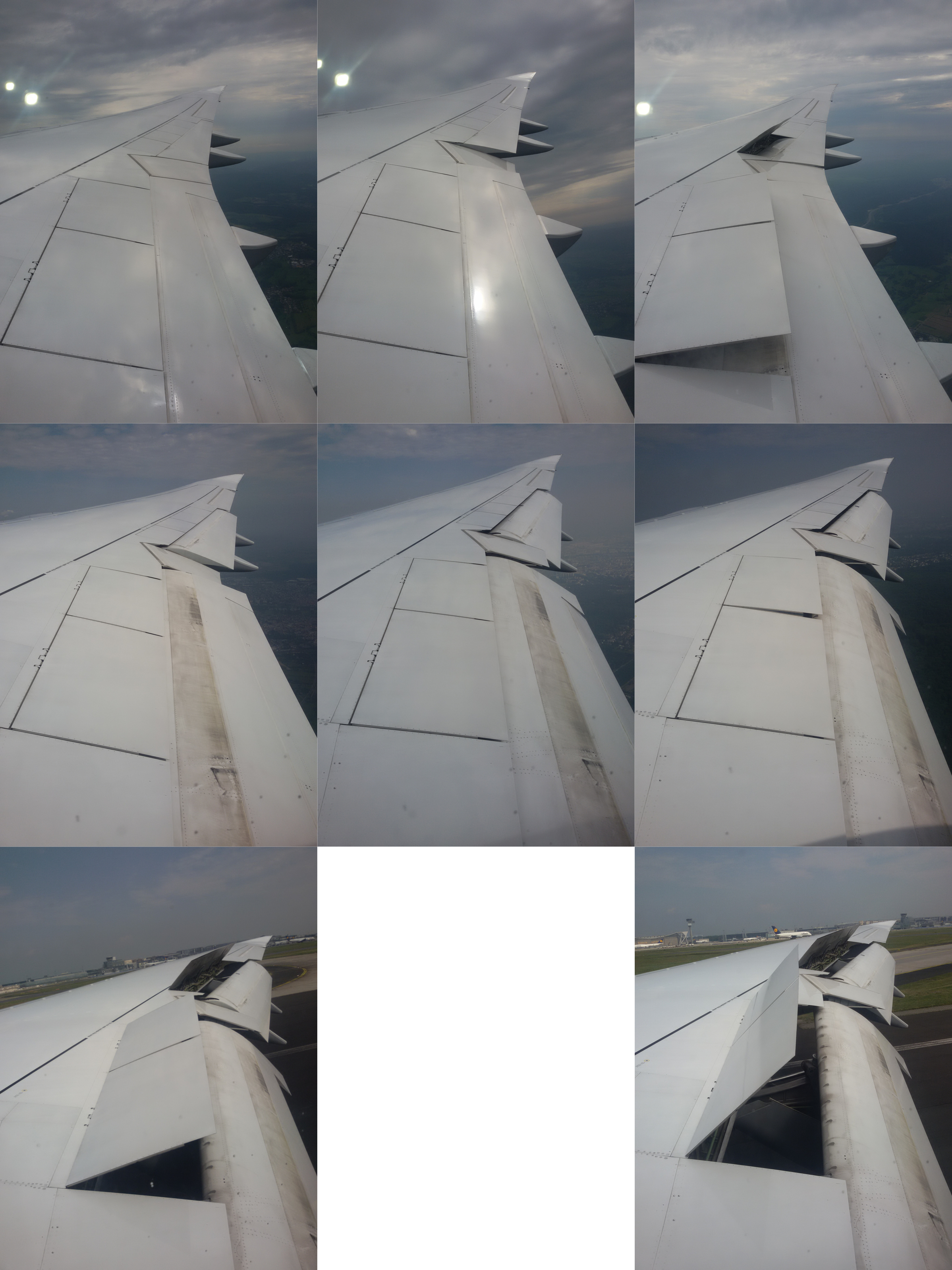
Wing trailing edge flight control surfaces of a Boeing 747-8. Top left: All surfaces at neutral position; Top middle: Right aileron is lowered; Top right: spoilers raised during flight; Middle row: Fowler flaps extended (left), extended more (middle), hinged with inboard slotted part hinged even more (right); Bottom row: spoilers raised during landing

On low drag aircraft such as sailplanes, spoilers are used to disrupt airflow over the wing and greatly reduce lift. This allows a glider pilot to lose altitude without gaining excessive airspeed. Spoilers are sometimes called "lift dumpers". Spoilers that can be used asymmetrically are called spoilerons and can affect an aircraft's roll.

=== Flaps ===
Flaps are mounted on the trailing edge on the inboard section of each wing (near the wing roots). They are deflected down to increase the effective curvature of the wing. Flaps raise the maximum lift coefficient of the aircraft and therefore reduce its stalling speed. They are used during low speed, high angle of attack flight including take-off and descent for landing. Some aircraft are equipped with "flaperons", which are more commonly called "inboard ailerons". These devices function primarily as ailerons, but on some aircraft, will "droop" when the flaps are deployed, thus acting as both a flap and a roll-control inboard aileron.

=== Slats ===
Slats, also known as leading edge devices, are extensions to the front of a wing for lift augmentation, and are intended to reduce the stalling speed by altering the airflow over the wing. Slats may be fixed or retractable - fixed slats (e.g. as on the Fieseler Fi 156 Storch) give excellent slow speed and STOL capabilities, but compromise higher speed performance. Retractable slats, as seen on most airliners, provide reduced stalling speed for take-off and landing, but are retracted for cruising.

=== Air brakes ===
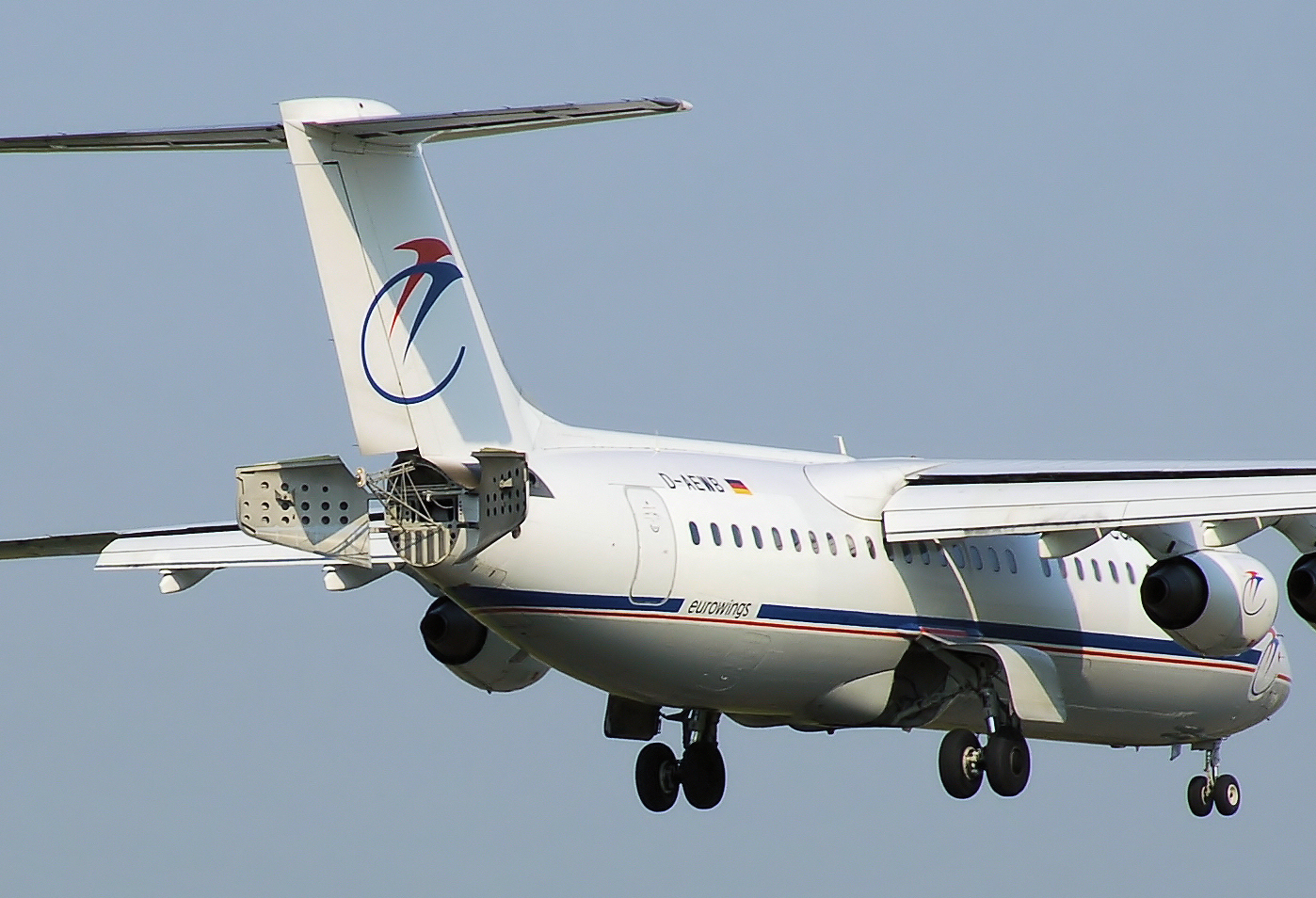
Air brakes on the rear fuselage of a Eurowings BAe 146-300

Air brakes are used to increase drag. Spoilers might act as air brakes, but are not pure air brakes as they also function as lift-dumpers or in some cases as roll control surfaces. Air brakes are usually surfaces that deflect outwards from the fuselage (in most cases symmetrically on opposing sides) into the airstream in order to increase form-drag. As they are in most cases located elsewhere on the aircraft, they do not directly affect the lift generated by the wing. Their purpose is to slow down the aircraft. They are particularly useful when a high rate of descent is required. They are common on high performance military aircraft as well as civilian aircraft, especially those lacking reverse thrust capability.

== Control trimming surfaces ==
Trimming controls allow a pilot to balance the lift and drag being produced by the wings and control surfaces over a wide range of load and airspeed. This reduces the effort required to adjust or maintain a desired flight attitude.

=== Elevator trim ===
Elevator trim balances the control force necessary to maintain the correct aerodynamic force on the tail to balance the aircraft. Whilst carrying out certain flight exercises, a lot of trim could be required to maintain the desired angle of attack. This mainly applies to slow flight, where a nose-up attitude is required, in turn requiring a lot of trim causing the tailplane to exert a strong downforce. Elevator trim is correlated with the speed of the airflow over the tail, thus airspeed changes to the aircraft require re-trimming. An important design parameter for aircraft is the stability of the aircraft when trimmed for level flight. Any disturbances such as gusts or turbulence will be damped over a short period of time and the aircraft will return to its level flight trimmed airspeed.

==== Trimming tail plane ====
Except for very light aircraft, trim tabs on the elevators are unable to provide the force and range of motion desired. To provide the appropriate trim force the entire horizontal tail plane is made adjustable in pitch. This allows the pilot to select exactly the right amount of positive or negative lift from the tail plane while reducing drag from the elevators.

==== Control horn ====
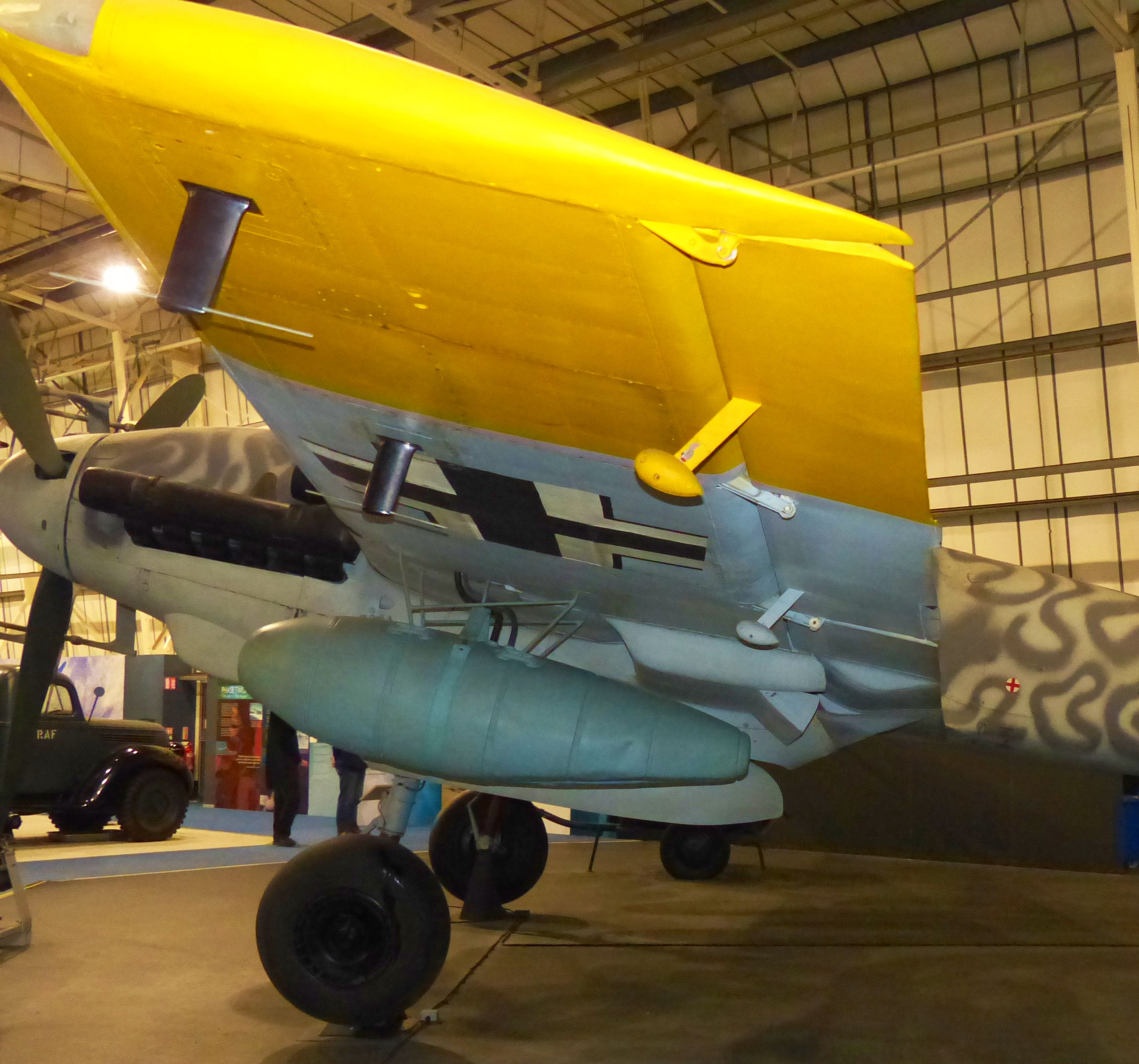
Mass balance protruding from an aileron used to suppress flutter

A control horn is a section of control surface which projects ahead of the pivot point. It generates a force which tends to increase the surface's deflection thus reducing the control pressure experienced by the pilot. Control horns may also incorporate a counterweight which helps to balance the control and prevent it from fluttering in the airstream. Some designs feature separate anti-flutter weights.

(In radio controlled model aircraft, the term "control horn" has a different meaning)

==== Spring trim ====
In the simplest arrangement, trimming is done by a mechanical spring (or bungee) which adds appropriate force to augment the pilot's control input. The spring is usually connected to an elevator trim lever to allow the pilot to set the spring force applied.

=== Rudder and aileron trim ===
Most fixed-wing aircraft have a trimming control surface on the elevator, but larger aircraft also have a trim control for the rudder, and another for the ailerons. The rudder trim is to counter any asymmetric thrust from the engines. Aileron trim is to counter the effects of the centre of gravity being displaced from the aircraft centerline. This can be caused by fuel or an item of payload being loaded more on one side of the aircraft compared to the other, such as when one fuel tank has more fuel than the other.

== See also ==
- Aircraft engine controls
- Aircraft flight control systems
- Aircraft flight mechanics
- Flight with disabled controls
- Ship motions
- Six degrees of freedom
- V-tail
- Wing warping
