= Adaptive compliant wing =

Type of wing

An adaptive compliant wing is a wing which is flexible enough for aspects of its shape to be changed in flight. Flexible wings have a number of benefits. Conventional flight control mechanisms operate using hinges, resulting in disruptions to the airflow, vortices, and in some cases, separation of the airflow. These effects contribute to the drag of the aircraft, resulting in less efficiency and higher fuel costs. Flexible aerofoils can manipulate aerodynamic forces with less disruptions to the flow, resulting in less aerodynamic drag and improved fuel economy.

== Shape adaptation ==
Classification of shape adaptation according to the motion

Changing the shape of an aerodynamic surface has a direct effect on its aerodynamic properties. According to the flow condition and to the initial shape of the part, each shape variation (curvature, incidence, twist...) can have a different impact on the resulting forces and moments.

This characteristic is actively pursued in adaptive wings which – by nature of their distributed compliance – can attain shape changes in a continuous, smooth, gap-free manner. By altering these geometrical parameters, the forces and moments can be modified, permitting to tailor them to the specific flight condition (e.g. for drag reduction) or to perform maneuvers (e.g. roll).

Shape adaptation can be classified according to the motion it enables. Motions that affect the overall planform of the wing "as seen from above" include changes in span (thus changing the length of the wings), in sweep (altering the angle between the wing and the fuselage axis), in chord length (increasing or reducing the length of the wing cross-section) and dihedral (changing the angle between the wings and the horizontal plane of the vehicle). Changes of the airfoil shapes include altering its twist, and changing its camber and thickness distribution.

== Ongoing research ==
=== FlexSys ===
An adaptive compliant wing designed by FlexSys Inc. features a variable-camber trailing edge which can be deflected up to ±10°, thus acting like a flap-equipped wing, but without the individual segments and gaps typical in a flap system. The wing itself can be twisted up to 1° per foot of span. The wing's shape can be changed at a rate of 30° per second, which is ideal for gust load alleviation. The development of the adaptive compliant wing is being sponsored by the U.S. Air Force Research Laboratory. Initially, the wing was tested in a wind tunnel, and then a 50-inch (1.3 m) section of wing was flight tested on board the Scaled Composites White Knight research aircraft in a seven-flight, 20-hour program operated from the Mojave Spaceport. Control methods are proposed.

=== ETH Zurich ===
Adaptive compliant wings are also investigated at ETH Zurich in the frame of the Smart airfoil project.

=== EU Flexop and FLiPASED ===
The EU-funded Flexop program aims to develop to enable higher wing aspect ratio for less induced drag with lighter, more flexible airliner wings, along developing active flutter suppression for flexible wings. Partners include Hungary's MTA SZTAKI, Airbus, Austria's FACC, Inasco of Greece, Delft University of Technology, German aerospace center DLR, TUM, the UK's University of Bristol and RWTH Aachen University in Germany.

On 19 November 2019, a 7 m (23 ft) span jet-powered UAV demonstrator with an aeroelastically tailored wing for passive load alleviation was flown in Oberpfaffenhofen, Germany, previously flown with a carbon-fiber, rigid wing to establish baseline performance. It has a conventional tube-and-wing configuration, unlike the blended wing body of the Lockheed Martin X-56. It follows the Grumman X-29 demonstrator in 1984, with more refined fiber orientations. The flexible wing is 4% lighter than the rigid one. The 54-month, €6.67 million ($7.4 million) project ends in November 2019, followed by the €3.85 million FLiPASED program from September 2019 until December 2022, using all the movable surfaces.

The glass fiber flutter wing should be flown in 2020, with unstable aeroelastic modes under 55 m/s (107 kn) that must be actively suppressed. With optimized aeroelastic tailoring and active flutter suppression, an aspect ratio of 12.4 could reduce fuel-burn by 5%, and 7% are targeted. FLiPASED is also led by MTA SZTAKI and includes partners TUM, DLR and French aerospace research agency ONERA.

== See also ==
- Aeroelasticity
- Boeing X-53 Active Aeroelastic Wing
- Parker variable wing
- Variable-camber wing
- Variable-sweep wing
- Wing warping
