= Stabilizer (aeronautics) =

Aircraft component

Vertical and horizontal stabilizer units on an Airbus A380 airliner

An aircraft stabilizer is an aerodynamic surface, typically including one or more movable control surfaces, that provides longitudinal (pitch) and/or directional (yaw) stability and control. A stabilizer can feature a fixed or adjustable structure on which any movable control surfaces are hinged, or it can itself be a fully movable surface such as a stabilator. Depending on the context, "stabilizer" may sometimes describe only the front part of the overall surface.

In the conventional aircraft configuration, separate vertical (fin) and horizontal (tailplane) stabilizers form an empennage positioned at the tail of the aircraft. Other arrangements of the empennage, such as the V-tail configuration, feature stabilizers which contribute to a combination of longitudinal and directional stabilization and control.

Longitudinal stability and control may be obtained with other wing configurations, including canard, tandem wing and tailless aircraft.

Some types of aircraft are stabilized with electronic flight control; in this case, fixed and movable surfaces located anywhere along the aircraft may serve as active motion dampers or stabilizers.

== Horizontal stabilizers ==
A Boeing 737 uses an adjustable stabilizer, moved by a jackscrew, to provide the required pitch trim forces. Generic stabilizer illustrated.

A horizontal stabilizer is used to maintain the aircraft in longitudinal balance, or trim: it exerts a vertical force at a distance so the summation of pitch moments about the center of gravity is zero. The vertical force exerted by the stabilizer varies with flight conditions, in particular according to the aircraft lift coefficient and wing flaps deflection which both affect the position of the center of pressure, and with the position of the aircraft center of gravity (which changes with aircraft loading and fuel consumption). Transonic flight makes special demands on horizontal stabilizers; when the local speed of the air over the wing reaches the speed of sound there is a sudden move aft of the center of pressure.

Another role of a horizontal stabilizer is to provide longitudinal static stability. Stability can be defined only when the vehicle is in trim; it refers to the tendency of the aircraft to return to the trimmed condition if it is disturbed. This maintains a constant aircraft attitude, with unchanging pitch angle relative to the airstream, without active input from the pilot. Ensuring static stability of an aircraft with a conventional wing requires that the aircraft center of gravity be ahead of the center of pressure, so a stabilizer positioned at the rear of the aircraft will produce lift in the downward direction.

The elevator serves to control the pitch axis; in case of a fully movable tail, the entire assembly acts as a control surface.

=== Wing-stabilizer interaction ===
The upwash and downwash associated with the generation of lift are the source of aerodynamic interaction between the wing and stabilizer, which translates into a change in the effective angle of attack for each surface. The influence of the wing on a tail is much more significant than the opposite effect and can be modeled using the Prandtl lifting-line theory; however, an accurate estimation of the interaction between multiple surfaces requires computer simulations or wind tunnel tests.

=== Horizontal stabilizer configurations ===
==== Conventional tailplane ====
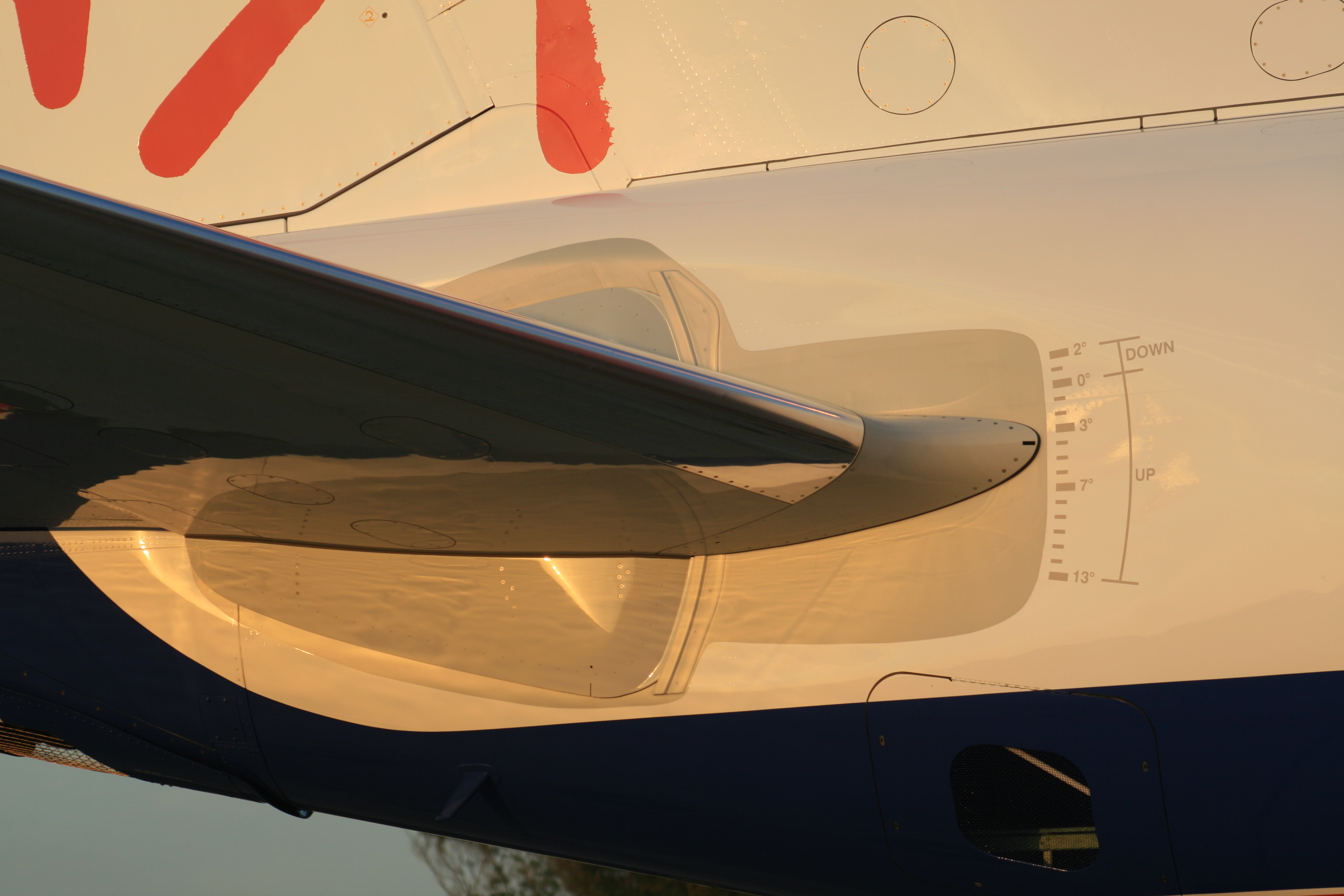
The adjustable horizontal stabilizer of an Embraer 170, with markings showing nose-up and nose-down trim angles

In the conventional configuration the horizontal stabilizer is a small horizontal tail or tailplane located to the rear of the aircraft. This is the most common configuration.

On many aircraft, the tailplane assembly consists of a fixed surface fitted with a hinged aft elevator surface. Trim tabs may be used to relieve pilot input forces. Alternatively, some light aircraft such as the Piper PA-24 Comanche and the Piper PA-28 Cherokee have an all-moving stabilizer known as a stabilator, with no separate elevator. Stabilators are also found in many supersonic aircraft, where a separate elevator control would cause unacceptable drag.

Most airliners and transport aircraft feature a large, slow-moving trimmable tail plane which is combined with independently-moving elevators. The elevators are controlled by the pilot or autopilot and primarily serve to change the aircraft's attitude, while the whole assembly is used to trim (maintaining horizontal static equilibrium) and stabilize the aircraft in the pitch axis. In the Boeing 737, the adjustable stabilizer trim system is powered by an electrically operated jackscrew.

Variants on the conventional configuration include the T-tail, Cruciform tail, Twin tail and Twin-boom mounted tail.

==== Three-surface aircraft ====
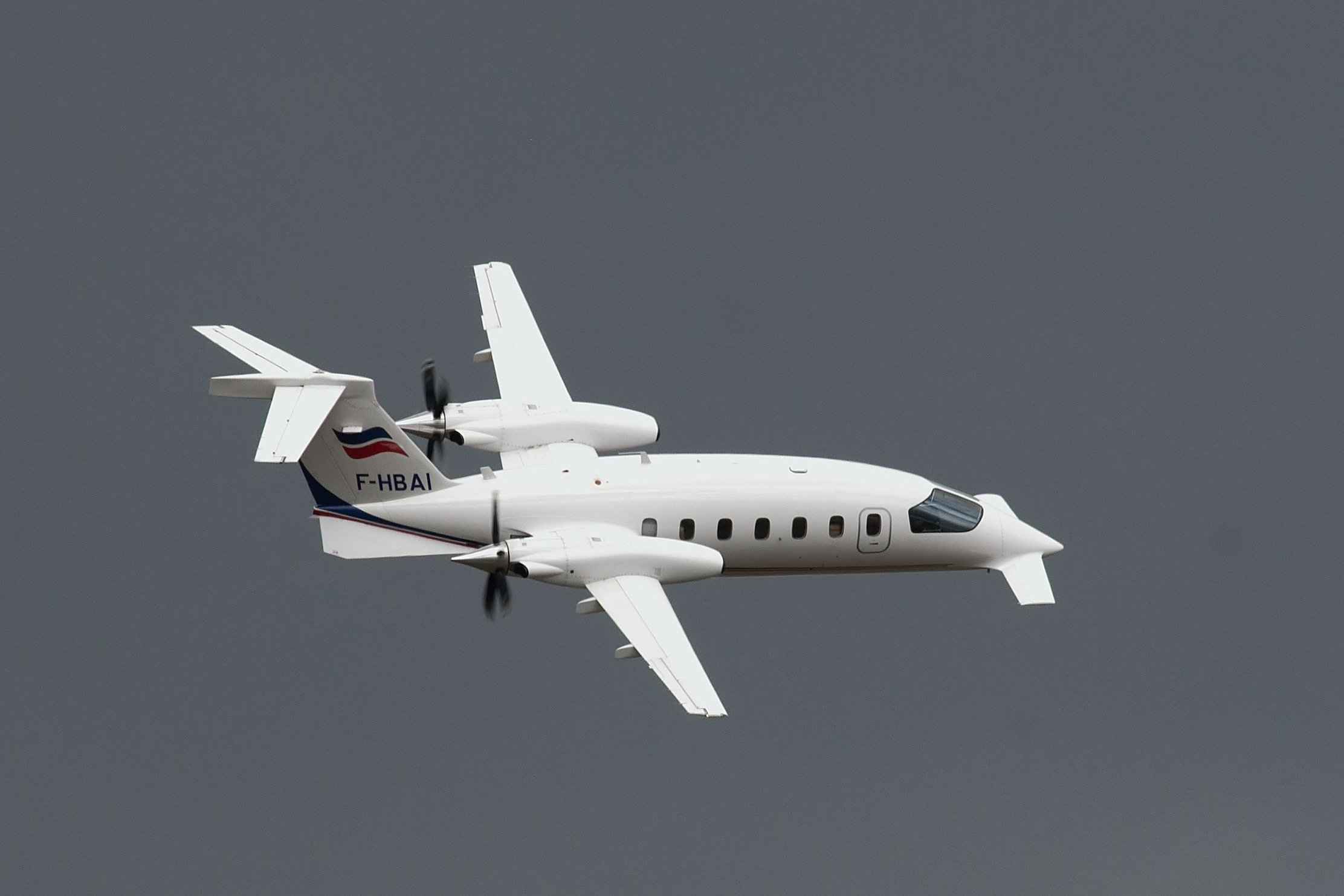
The three-surface configuration of the Piaggio P-180 Avanti

Three-surface aircraft such as the Piaggio P.180 Avanti or the Scaled Composites Triumph and Catbird, the tailplane is a stabilizer as in conventional aircraft; the frontplane, called foreplane or canard, provides lift and serves as a balancing surface.

Some earlier three-surface aircraft, such as the Curtiss AEA June Bug or the Voisin 1907 biplane, were of conventional layout with an additional front pitch control surface which was called "elevator" or sometimes "stabilisateur". Lacking elevators, the tailplanes of these aircraft were not what is now called conventional stabilizers. For example, the Voisin was a tandem-lifting layout (main wing and rear wing) with a foreplane that was neither stabilizing nor mainly lifting; it was called an "équilibreur" ("balancer"), and used as a pitch control and trim surface.

==== Canard aircraft ====
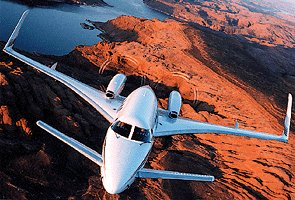
The canard configuration of the Beechcraft Starship

In the canard configuration, a small wing, or foreplane, is located in front of the main wing. Some authors call it a stabilizer or give to the foreplane alone a stabilizing role, although as far as pitch stability is concerned, a foreplane is generally described as a destabilizing surface, the main wing providing the stabilizing moment in pitch.

In naturally unstable aircraft, the canard surfaces may be used as an active part of the artificial stability system, and are sometimes named horizontal stabilizers.

==== Tailless aircraft ====
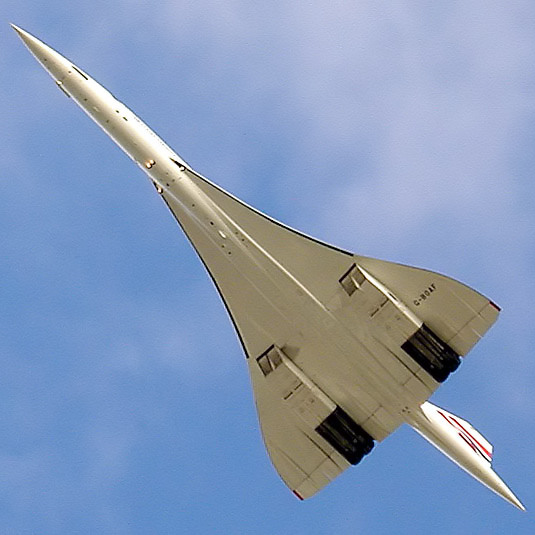
The tailless configuration of Concorde

Tailless aircraft lack a separate horizontal stabilizer. In a tailless aircraft, the horizontal stabilizing surface is part of the main wing. Longitudinal stability in tailless aircraft is achieved by designing the aircraft so that its aerodynamic center is behind the center of gravity. This is generally done by modifying the wing design, for example by varying the angle of incidence in the span-wise direction (wing washout or twist), or by using reflexed camber airfoils.

== Vertical stabilizers ==
A vertical stabilizer provides directional (or yaw) stability and usually comprises a fixed fin and movable control rudder hinged to its rear edge. Less commonly, there is no hinge and the whole fin surface is pivoted for both stability and control.

When an aircraft encounters a horizontal gust of wind, yaw stability causes the aircraft to turn into the wind, rather than turn in the same direction.

Fuselage geometry, engine nacelles, and rotating propellers all influence lateral static stability and affect the required size of the stabilizer.

Not all aircraft have a vertical stabilizer. Instead, wing sweep and dihedral can provide a similar degree of directional stability, while directional control is often effected by adding drag on the side of the aircraft the aircraft is to be turned towards, either in the form of spoilers or split ailerons.

=== Tailless directional stabilization and control ===
Although the use of a vertical stabilizer is most common, it is possible to obtain directional stability with no discrete vertical stabilizer. This occurs when the wing is swept back and in some cases, as for example on the Rogallo wing often used for hang gliders, means that no fin is needed.

- Stabilization. When a swept wing is rotated in yaw the outer wing sweep is reduced, so increasing drag, while the inner wing sweep increases, reducing drag. This change in the drag distribution creates a restoring moment.
- Control. A way to get yaw control is to use differential air braking to affect the drag directly. This technique is suited to Electronic flight controls, as on the Northrop Grumman B-2 flying wing.

== Combined longitudinal–directional stabilizers ==
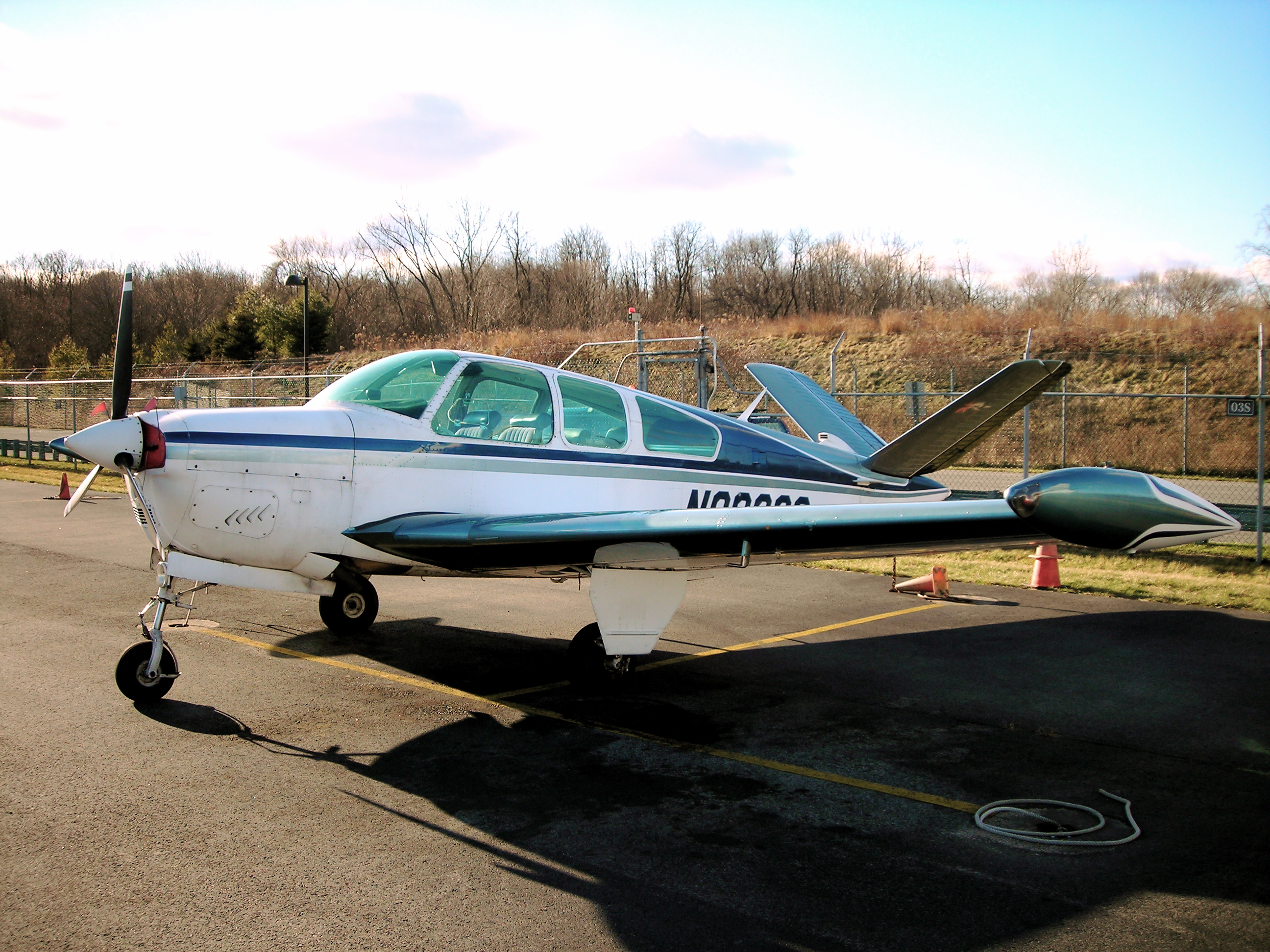
The Beechcraft Bonanza, the most common example of V-tail empennage configuration

On some aircraft, horizontal and vertical stabilizers are combined in a pair of surfaces named V-tail. In this arrangement, two stabilizers (fins and rudders) are mounted at 90–120° to each other, (Note: F-117 Nighthawk, 90° – Fouga Magister, 105° – Beech Bonanza, 116°) giving a larger horizontal projected area than a vertical one, as in the majority of conventional tails. The moving control surfaces are then named ruddervators. (Note: A portmanteau of rudder & elevator) The V-tail thus acts as both a yaw and a pitch stabilizer.

Although it may seem that the V-tail configuration can result in a significant reduction of the tail wetted area, it suffers from an increase in control-actuation complexity, as well as complex and detrimental aerodynamic interaction between the two surfaces. This often results in an upsizing in the total area that reduces or negates the original benefit. The Beechcraft Bonanza light aircraft was originally designed with a V-tail.

Others combined layouts exist. The General Atomics MQ-1 Predator unmanned aircraft has an inverted V-tail. The tail surfaces of the Lockheed XFV could be described as a V-tail with surfaces that extended through the fuselage to the opposite side. The LearAvia Lear Fan had a Y-tail. All twin tail arrangements with a tail dihedral angle will provide a combination of longitudinal and directional stabilization.

== See also ==
- Index of aviation articles
