= Center of pressure (fluid mechanics) =

Point at which the resultant force of a pressure field acts on a body

In fluid mechanics, the center of pressure is the point on a body where a single force acting at that point can represent the total effect of the pressure field acting on the body. The total force vector acting at the center of pressure is the surface integral of the pressure vector field across the surface of the body. The resultant force and center of pressure location produce an equivalent force and moment (torque) on the body as the original pressure field.

Pressure fields occur in both static and dynamic fluid mechanics. Specification of the center of pressure, the reference point from which the center of pressure is referenced, and the associated force vector allows the moment generated about any point to be computed by a translation from the reference point to the desired new point. It is common for the center of pressure to be located on the body, but in fluid flows it is possible for the pressure field to exert a moment on the body of such magnitude that the center of pressure is located outside the body.

== Hydrostatic example (dam) ==
Since the forces of water on a dam are hydrostatic forces, they vary linearly with depth. The total force on the dam is then the integral of the pressure multiplied by the width of the dam as a function of the depth. The center of pressure is located at the centroid of the triangular shaped pressure field $\tfrac{2}{3}$ from the top of the water line. The hydrostatic force and tipping moment on the dam about some point can be computed from the total force and center of pressure location relative to the point of interest.

== Historical usage for sailboats ==
Center of pressure is used in sailboat design to represent the position on a sail where the aerodynamic force is concentrated.

The relationship of the aerodynamic center of pressure on the sails to the hydrodynamic center of pressure (referred to as the center of lateral resistance) on the hull determines the behavior of the boat in the wind. This behavior is known as the "helm" and is either a weather helm or lee helm. A slight amount of weather helm is thought by some sailors to be a desirable situation, both from the standpoint of the "feel" of the helm, and the tendency of the boat to head slightly to windward in stronger gusts, to some extent self-feathering the sails. Other sailors disagree and prefer a neutral helm.

The fundamental cause of "helm", be it weather or lee, is the relationship of the center of pressure of the sail plan to the center of lateral resistance of the hull. If the center of pressure is astern of the center of lateral resistance, a weather helm, the tendency of the vessel is to want to turn into the wind.

If the situation is reversed, with the center of pressure forward of the center of lateral resistance of the hull, a "lee" helm will result, which is generally considered undesirable, if not dangerous. Too much of either helm is not good, since it forces the helmsman to hold the rudder deflected to counter it, thus inducing extra drag beyond what a vessel with neutral or minimal helm would experience.

== Aircraft aerodynamics ==
A stable configuration is desirable not only in sailing, but in aircraft design as well. Aircraft design therefore borrowed the term center of pressure. And like a sail, a rigid non-symmetrical airfoil not only produces lift, but a moment (torque). The center of pressure of an aircraft is the point where all of the aerodynamic pressure field may be represented by a single force vector with no moment. A similar idea is the aerodynamic center which is the point on an airfoil where the pitching moment produced by the aerodynamic forces is constant with angle of attack.

The aerodynamic center plays an important role in analysis of the longitudinal static stability of all flying machines. It is desirable that when the pitch angle and angle of attack of an aircraft are disturbed (by, for example wind shear/vertical gust) that the aircraft returns to its original trimmed pitch angle and angle of attack without a pilot or autopilot changing the control surface deflection. For an aircraft to return towards its trimmed attitude, without input from a pilot or autopilot, it must have positive longitudinal static stability.

== Missile aerodynamics ==
Missiles typically do not have a preferred plane or direction of maneuver and thus have symmetric airfoils. Since the center of pressure for symmetric airfoils is relatively constant for small angle of attack, missile engineers typically speak of the complete center of pressure of the entire vehicle for stability and control analysis. In missile analysis, the center of pressure is typically defined as the center of the additional pressure field due to a change in the angle of attack off of the trim angle of attack.

For unguided rockets the trim position is typically zero angle of attack and the center of pressure is defined to be the center of pressure of the resultant flow field on the entire vehicle resulting from a very small angle of attack (that is, the center of pressure is the limit as angle of attack goes to zero). For positive stability in missiles, the total vehicle center of pressure defined as given above must be further from the nose of the vehicle than the center of gravity. In missiles at lower angles of attack, the contributions to the center of pressure are dominated by the nose, wings, and fins. The normalized normal force coefficient derivative with respect to the angle of attack of each component multiplied by the location of the center of pressure can be used to compute a centroid representing the total center of pressure. The center of pressure of the added flow field is behind the center of gravity and the additional force "points" in the direction of the added angle of attack; this produces a moment that pushes the vehicle back to the trim position.

In guided missiles where the fins can be moved to trim the vehicles in different angles of attack, the center of pressure is the center of pressure of the flow field at that angle of attack for the undeflected fin position. This is the center of pressure of any small change in the angle of attack (as defined above). Once again for positive static stability, this definition of center of pressure requires that the center of pressure be further from the nose than the center of gravity. This ensures that any increased forces resulting from increased angle of attack results in increased restoring moment to drive the missile back to the trimmed position. In missile analysis, positive static margin implies that the complete vehicle makes a restoring moment for any angle of attack from the trim position.

== Movement of center of pressure for aerodynamic fields ==
The center of pressure on a symmetric airfoil typically lies close to 25% of the chord length behind the leading edge of the airfoil. (This is called the "quarter-chord point".) For a symmetric airfoil, as angle of attack and lift coefficient change, the center of pressure does not move. It remains around the quarter-chord point for angles of attack below the stalling angle of attack. The role of center of pressure in the control characterization of aircraft takes a different form than in missiles.

On a cambered airfoil the center of pressure does not occupy a fixed location. For a conventionally cambered airfoil, the center of pressure lies a little behind the quarter-chord point at maximum lift coefficient (large angle of attack), but as lift coefficient reduces (angle of attack reduces) the center of pressure moves toward the rear. When the lift coefficient is zero an airfoil is generating no lift but a conventionally cambered airfoil generates a nose-down pitching moment, so the location of the center of pressure is an infinite distance behind the airfoil.

For a reflex-cambered airfoil, the center of pressure lies a little ahead of the quarter-chord point at maximum lift coefficient (large angle of attack), but as lift coefficient reduces (angle of attack reduces) the center of pressure moves forward. When the lift coefficient is zero an airfoil is generating no lift but a reflex-cambered airfoil generates a nose-up pitching moment, so the location of the center of pressure is an infinite distance ahead of the airfoil. This direction of movement of the center of pressure on a reflex-cambered airfoil has a stabilising effect.

The way the center of pressure moves as lift coefficient changes makes it difficult to use the center of pressure in the mathematical analysis of longitudinal static stability of an aircraft. For this reason, it is much simpler to use the aerodynamic center when carrying out a mathematical analysis. The aerodynamic center occupies a fixed location on an airfoil, typically close to the quarter-chord point.

The aerodynamic center is the conceptual starting point for longitudinal stability. The horizontal stabilizer contributes extra stability and this allows the center of gravity to be a small distance aft of the aerodynamic center without the aircraft reaching neutral stability. The position of the center of gravity at which the aircraft has neutral stability is called the neutral point.

== See also ==
- Aerodynamic center
- Aerodynamic force
- Aeroprediction
- Center of lateral resistance
- Longitudinal static stability
- Zero moment point
