= Pitching moment =

Torque on an airfoil from forces applied at the aerodynamic center

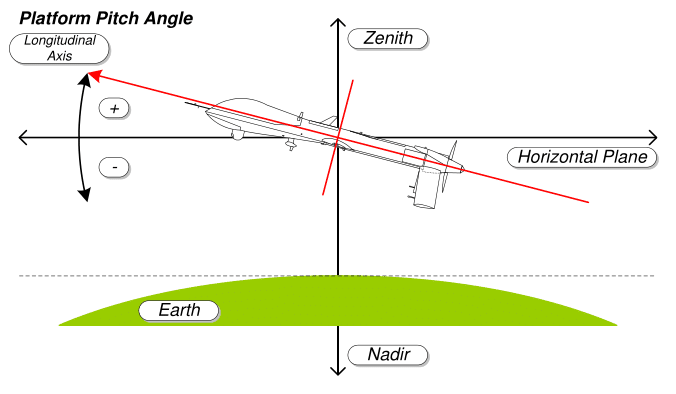
Pitching moment changes pitch angle

A graph showing coefficient of pitching moment with respect to angle of attack for an airplane.

In aerodynamics, the pitching moment on an airfoil is the moment (or torque) produced by the aerodynamic force with respect to the aerodynamic center on the airfoil . The pitching moment on the wing of an airplane is part of the total moment that must be balanced using the lift on the horizontal stabilizer. More generally, a pitching moment is any moment acting on the pitch axis of a moving body.

The lift on an airfoil is a distributed force that can be said to act at a point called the center of pressure. However, as angle of attack changes on a cambered airfoil, there is movement of the center of pressure forward and aft. This makes analysis difficult when attempting to use the concept of the center of pressure. One of the remarkable properties of a cambered airfoil is that, even though the center of pressure moves forward and aft, if the lift is imagined to act at a point called the aerodynamic center, the moment of the lift force changes in proportion to the square of the airspeed. If the moment is divided by the dynamic pressure, the area and chord of the airfoil, the result is known as the pitching moment coefficient. This coefficient changes only a little over the operating range of angle of attack of the airfoil.

The moment coefficient for a whole airplane is not the same as that of its wing. The figure on the right shows the variation of moment with AoA for a stable airplane. The negative slope for positive α indicates stability in pitch. The combination of the two concepts of aerodynamic center and pitching moment coefficient makes it relatively simple to analyse some of the flight characteristics of an aircraft.

== Measurement ==
The aerodynamic center of an airfoil is usually close to 25% of the chord behind the leading edge of the airfoil. When making tests on a model airfoil, such as in a wind-tunnel, if the force sensor is not aligned with the quarter-chord of the airfoil, but offset by a distance x, the pitching moment about the quarter-chord point, $M_{c/4}$ is given by

$$M_{c/4} = M_\text{indicated} + \mathbf{x}\times (D_\text{indicated}, L_\text{indicated})$$

where the indicated values of D and L are the drag and lift on the model, as measured by the force sensor.

== Coefficient ==
The pitching moment coefficient is important in the study of the longitudinal static stability of aircraft and missiles.

The pitching moment coefficient $C_m$ is defined as follows

$$C_m=\frac{M}{qSc}$$

where M is the pitching moment, q is the dynamic pressure, S is the wing area, and c is the length of the chord of the airfoil. $C_m$ is a dimensionless coefficient so consistent units must be used for M, q, S and c.

Pitching moment coefficient is fundamental to the definition of aerodynamic center of an airfoil. The aerodynamic center is defined to be the point on the chord line of the airfoil at which the pitching moment coefficient does not vary with angle of attack, or at least does not vary significantly over the operating range of angle of attack of the airfoil.

In the case of a symmetric airfoil, the lift force acts through one point for all angles of attack, and the center of pressure does not move as it does in a cambered airfoil. Consequently, the pitching moment coefficient about this point for a symmetric airfoil is zero.

The pitching moment is, by convention, considered to be positive when it acts to pitch the airfoil in the nose-up direction. Conventional cambered airfoils supported at the aerodynamic center pitch nose-down so the pitching moment coefficient of these airfoils is negative.

== See also ==
Mnemonics to remember angle names

- Aircraft flight mechanics
- Flight dynamics
- Longitudinal static stability
- Neutral point
- Lift coefficient
- Drag coefficient

== Bibliography ==
- L. J. Clancy (1975), Aerodynamics, Pitman Publishing Limited, London, ISBN 0-273-01120-0
- Piercy, N.A.V (1943) Aerodynamics, pages 384–386, English Universities Press. London
- Low-Speed Stability Retrieved on 2008-07-18
