= OpenRocket =

Open-source rocket simulation software

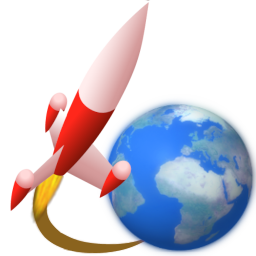

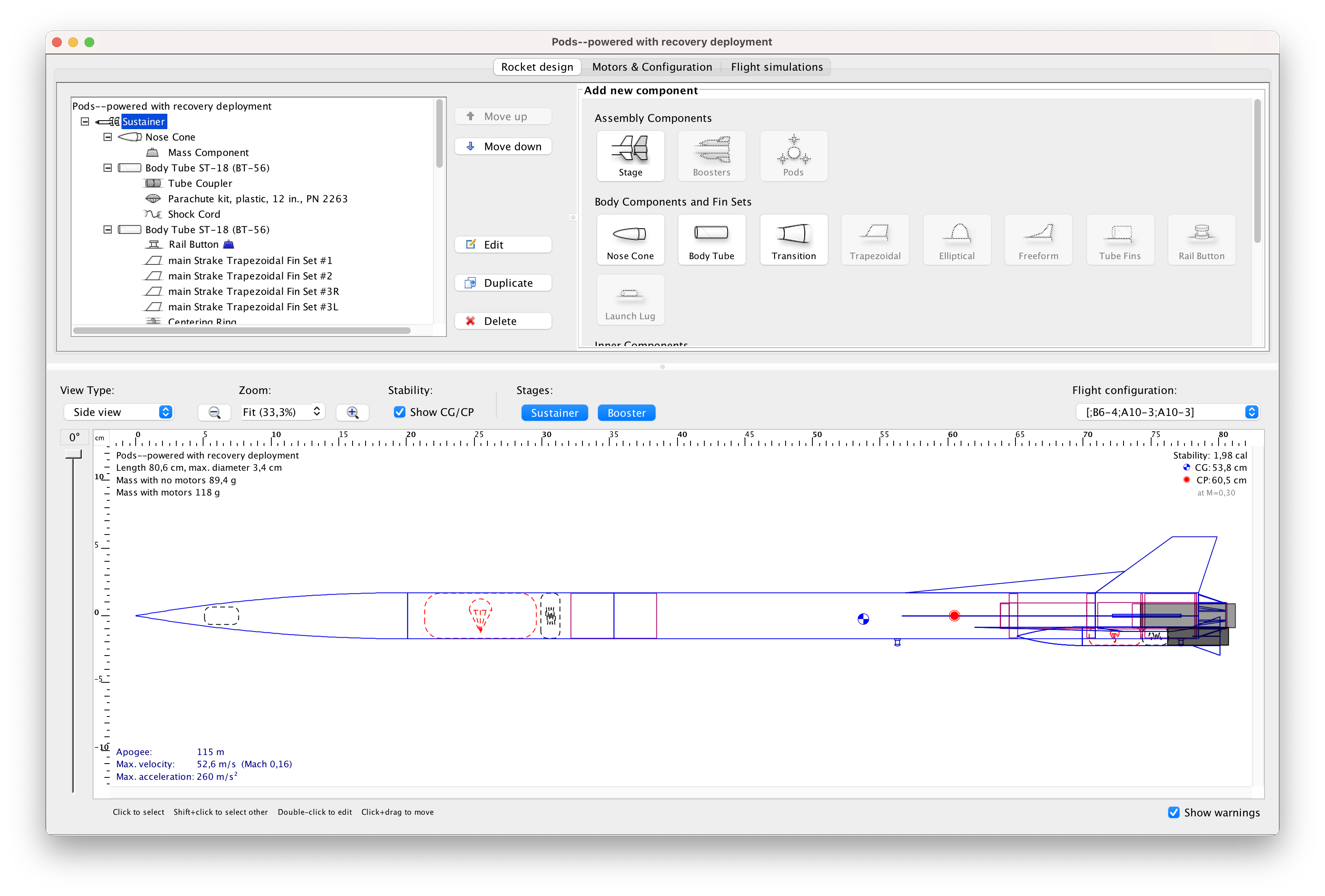
- OpenRocket 22.02 home screen
- Original author: Sampo Niskanen
- Developer: OpenRocket development team
- Release: 2009; 17 years ago
- Stable release: 24.12 / 27 July 2025
- Written in: Java
- Operating system: Linux, macOS, Windows
- Type: Model rocket design and flight simulation
- License: GPL-3.0
- Website: openrocket.info
- Repository: github.com/openrocket/openrocket

OpenRocket is a free and open-source application for designing model rockets and simulating their flight. The software provides a component-based rocket design environment together with aerodynamic analysis, stability calculations and flight simulation. It is written in Java and is available for Windows, macOS and Linux.

OpenRocket was originally developed by Sampo Niskanen as part of his 2009 master's thesis at the Helsinki University of Technology.

== History ==
OpenRocket originated from Niskanen's master's thesis, which investigated methods for calculating the aerodynamic properties and flight trajectories of model rockets and implemented these methods in an open-source software application. The work was based in part on the aerodynamic methods developed by James Barrowman, with extensions for effects including large angles of attack and free-form fins. The thesis also described atmospheric modelling and a six-degree-of-freedom flight simulation.

Development has continued as an open-source project. The software is currently released under the GNU General Public License.

== Design and simulation ==
OpenRocket allows rockets to be constructed from components including nose cones, body tubes, fins, internal components, recovery devices and rocket motors. As a design is modified, the program calculates quantities such as the rocket's center of gravity and center of pressure.

The program can analyse the contribution of individual components to aerodynamic properties including stability, drag and roll. It can also simulate a complete flight under user-defined atmospheric and launch conditions. Its simulation model uses empirical aerodynamic methods based on the geometry of the rocket.

== Coverage and use ==
In 2013, Linux Journal published a detailed article by Joey Bernard demonstrating the use of OpenRocket for designing, analysing, optimizing and simulating model rockets. In 2018, issue 12 of HackSpace magazine included a tutorial by Jo Hinchliffe on designing and simulating a model rocket using OpenRocket.

OpenRocket has also been examined in engineering research. Brown et al. compared an OpenRocket simulation of a student-built rocket with measured flight data and with a rigid-body dynamics simulation using aerodynamic coefficients derived from wind-tunnel and computational-fluid-dynamics testing.

In 2025, Jacob Schrum and Cody Crosby used OpenRocket as the simulation environment in a study applying quality-diversity algorithms to model-rocket design. Designs generated in the study were subsequently manufactured and launched, allowing the researchers to examine differences between simulated and real-world behaviour.

== See also ==
- Model rocketry
- Flight dynamics
