= Center of lateral resistance =

The center of lateral resistance is the center of pressure of the hydrodynamic forces on the hull of a boat. The center of pressure is the point on a body where the total sum of a pressure field acts, causing a force and no moment about that point. The total force vector acting at the center of pressure is the value of the integrated vectorial pressure field. The resultant force and center of pressure location produce equivalent force and moment on the body as the original pressure field. Pressure fields occur in both static and dynamic fluid mechanics. Specification of the center of pressure, the reference point from which the center of pressure is referenced, and the associated force vector allows the moment generated about any point to be computed by a translation from the reference point to the desired new point.

The relationship of the aerodynamic center of pressure on the sails of a sailboat to the hydrodynamic center of lateral resistance on the hull determines the behavior of the sailboat in the wind. This behavior is known as the "helm" and is either a Weather helm or lee helm. A slight amount of weather helm is thought by some sailors to be a desirable situation, both from the standpoint of the "feel" of the helm, and the tendency of the boat to head slightly to windward in stronger gusts, to some extent self-feathering the sails and pointing into oncoming waves. Other sailors disagree and prefer a neutral helm.

The fundamental cause of "helm", be it weather or lee, is the relationship of the center of pressure of the sail plan to the center of lateral resistance of the hull. If the center of pressure is astern of the center of lateral resistance, the result is a weather helm, the tendency of the vessel to want to turn into the wind.

If the situation is reversed, with the center of pressure forward of the center of lateral resistance of the hull, a "lee" helm will result, which is generally considered undesirable, if not dangerous. Too much of either helm is not good, since it forces the helmsman to hold the rudder deflected to counter it, thus inducing extra drag beyond what a vessel with neutral or minimal helm would experience.

== Other boats ==
Other boats, including kayaks, are subject to the same phenomena. To counter this, they use a rudder or skeg.

== See also ==
- Centerboard
- Keel
- Leeboard
- Rudder
- Skeg
