= Ship's wheel =

Mechanism used to steer watercraft

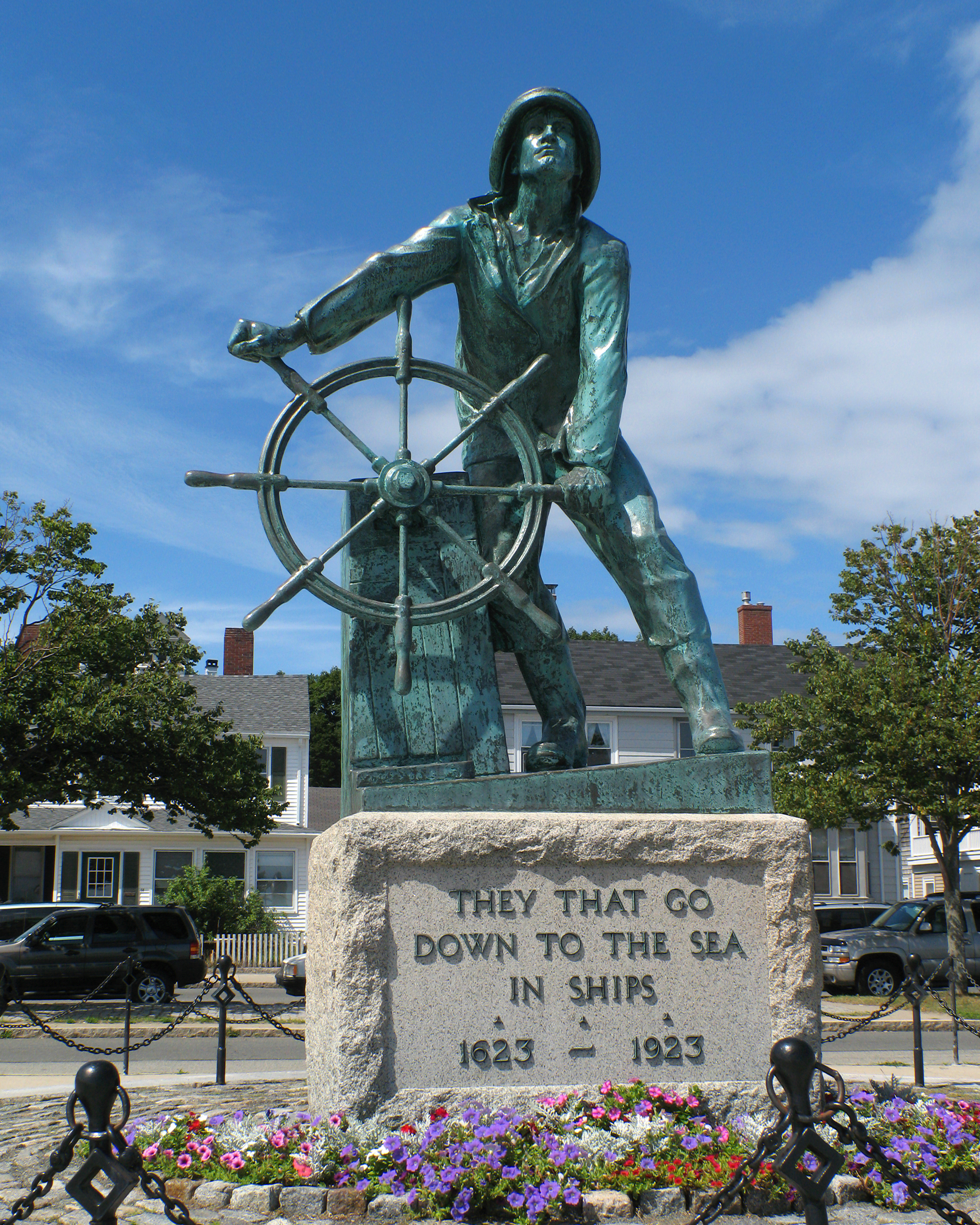
Iconic image of a helmsman at a ship's wheel: the Gloucester Fisherman's Memorial.

A ship's wheel or boat's wheel is a device used aboard a ship, boat, submarine, or airship, with which a helmsman steers the vessel and controls its course. Together with the rest of the steering mechanism, it forms part of the helm (the term helm can mean the wheel alone, or the entire mechanism by which the rudder is controlled). It is connected to a mechanical, electric servo, or hydraulic system which alters the horizontal angle of the vessel's rudder relative to its hull. In some modern ships the wheel is replaced with a simple toggle that remotely controls an electro-mechanical or electro-hydraulic drive for the rudder, with a rudder position indicator presenting feedback to the helmsman.

== History ==
Until the invention of the ship's wheel, the helmsman relied on a tiller—a horizontal bar fitted directly to the top of the rudder post—or a whipstaff—a vertical stick acting on the arm of the ship's tiller. A ship's wheel was a windlass connecting to the end of the lever that controlled the rudder. However, the end of the lever moved in an arc, while the ropes of the windlass moved in straight lines. For a ship's wheel to be functional, its mechanism had to compensate for this discrepancy, or else the tiller-rope would slacken and tighten throughout the arc, and would be liable to snap. An early solution to this problem was a mechanism in which the tiller-rope was braced against a curved sweep at the head of the tiller. This innovation appears to have been introduced near the start of the 18th century, although the name of the inventor, country of origin, and exact date of introduction have not been identified. The ship's wheel was commonly used from this time, with the French officially adopted the ship's wheel in 1709 and the Venetians in 1719.

== Design ==
Diagram of the steering gear of an 18th- to 19th-century sailing ship

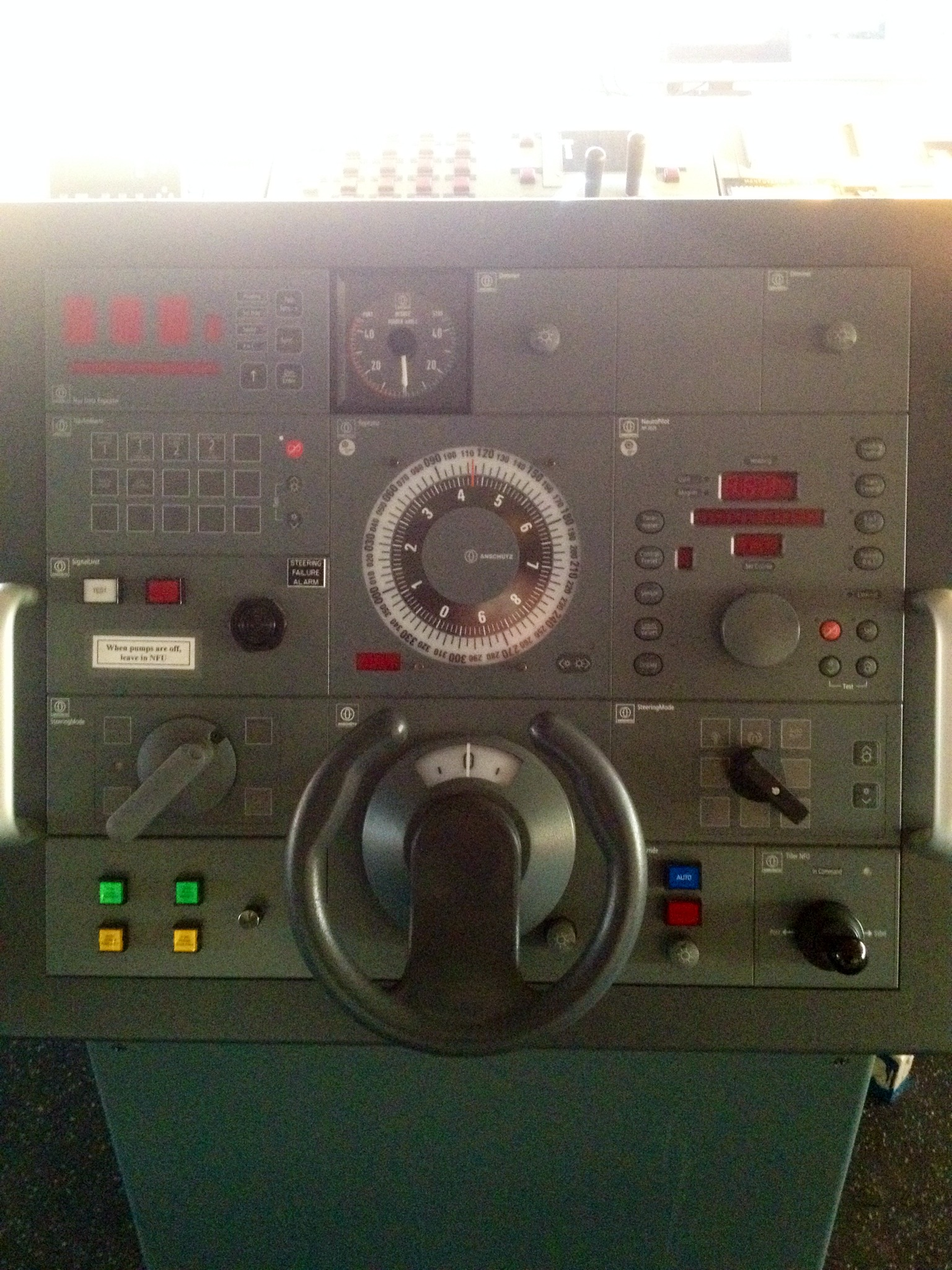
Helm of TS Golden Bear

A ship's wheel is composed of eight cylindrical wooden spokes (though sometimes as few as six or as many as ten or twelve depending on the wheel's size and how much force is needed to turn it) shaped like balusters and all joined at a central wooden hub or nave (sometimes covered with a brass nave plate) which houses the axle. The square hole at the centre of the hub through which the axle runs is called the drive square and was often lined with a brass plate (and therefore called a brass boss, though this term was used more often to refer to a brass hub and nave plate) which was frequently etched with the name of the wheel's manufacturer. The outer rim is composed of sections each made up of stacks of three felloes, the facing felloe, the middle felloe, and the after felloe. Because each group of three felloes at one time made up a quarter of the distance around the rim, the entire outer wooden wheel was sometimes called the quadrant. Each spoke runs through the middle felloe, creating a series of handles beyond the wheel's rim. One of these handles/spokes was frequently provided with extra grooves at its tip which could be felt by a helmsman steering in the dark and used by him to determine the exact position of the rudder—this is the king spoke, and when it pointed straight upward the rudder was believed to be dead straight to the hull. The completed ship's wheel and associated axle and pedestals might even be taller than the person using it. The wood used in construction of this type of wheel was most often either teak or mahogany, both of which are very durable tropical hardwoods capable of surviving the effects of salt water spray and regular use without significant decomposition. Modern design—particularly on smaller vessels—can deviate from the template.

== Mechanism ==
Front and overhead view of a traditional ship's wheel in motion.

The steering gear of earlier ships' wheels sometimes consisted of a double wheel where each wheel was connected to the other with a wooden spindle that ran through a barrel or drum. The spindle was held up by two pedestals that rested on a wooden platform, often no more than a grate. A tiller rope or tiller chain (sometimes called a steering rope or steering chain) ran around the barrel in five or six loops and then down through two tiller rope/ chain slots at the top of the platform before connecting to two sheaves just below deck (one on either side of the ship's wheel) and thence out to a pair of pulleys before coming back together at the tiller and connecting to the ship's rudder. Movement of the wheels (which were connected and moved in unison) caused the tiller rope to wind in one of two directions and angled the tiller left or right. In a typical and intuitive arrangement, a forward-facing helmsman turning the wheel counterclockwise would cause the tiller to angle to starboard and therefore the rudder to swing to port causing the vessel to also turn to port (see animation). Having two wheels connected by an axle allowed two people to take the helm in severe weather when one person alone might not have had enough strength to control the ship's movements.

When at the full extent of travel, the wheel and rudder are said to be "hard over", hence the order "hard port/starboard" given by Captain/Officer of the Watch.

== Gallery ==
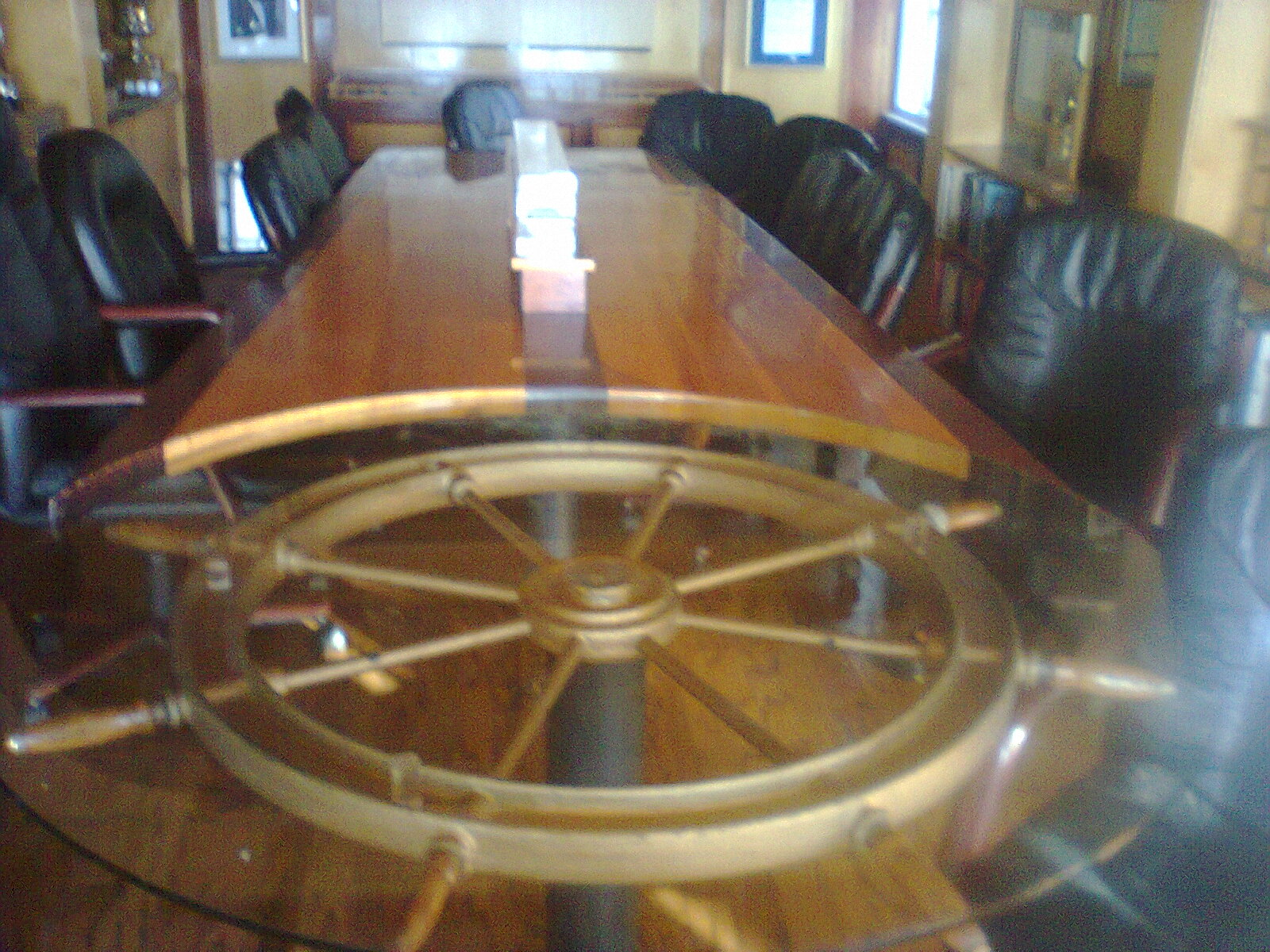
Britannia Yacht Club's Commodore Boardroom features a ship's wheel table

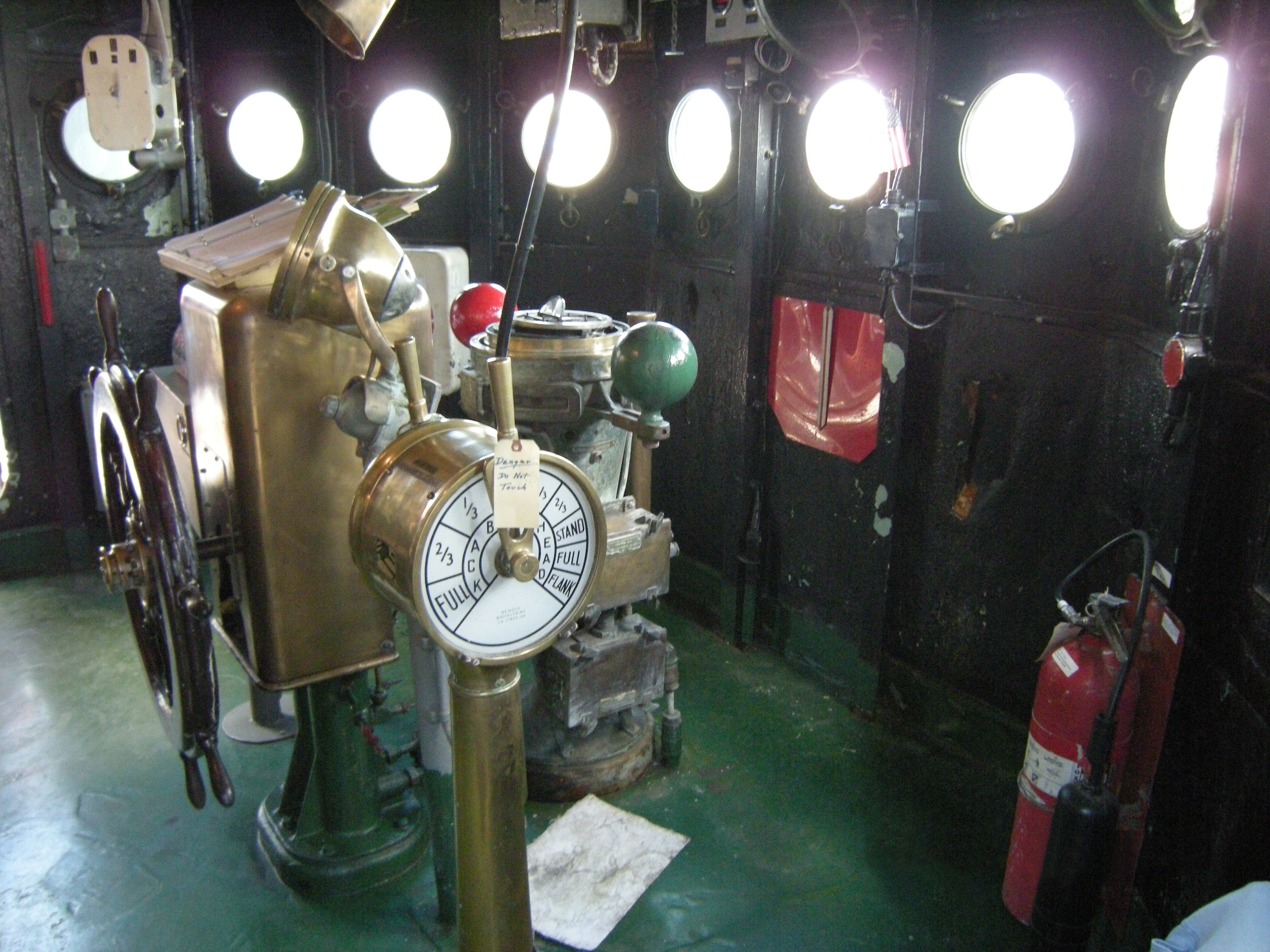
USS LST-325 ship's wheel and engine order telegraph, the latter also referred to in the US Navy as the lee helm

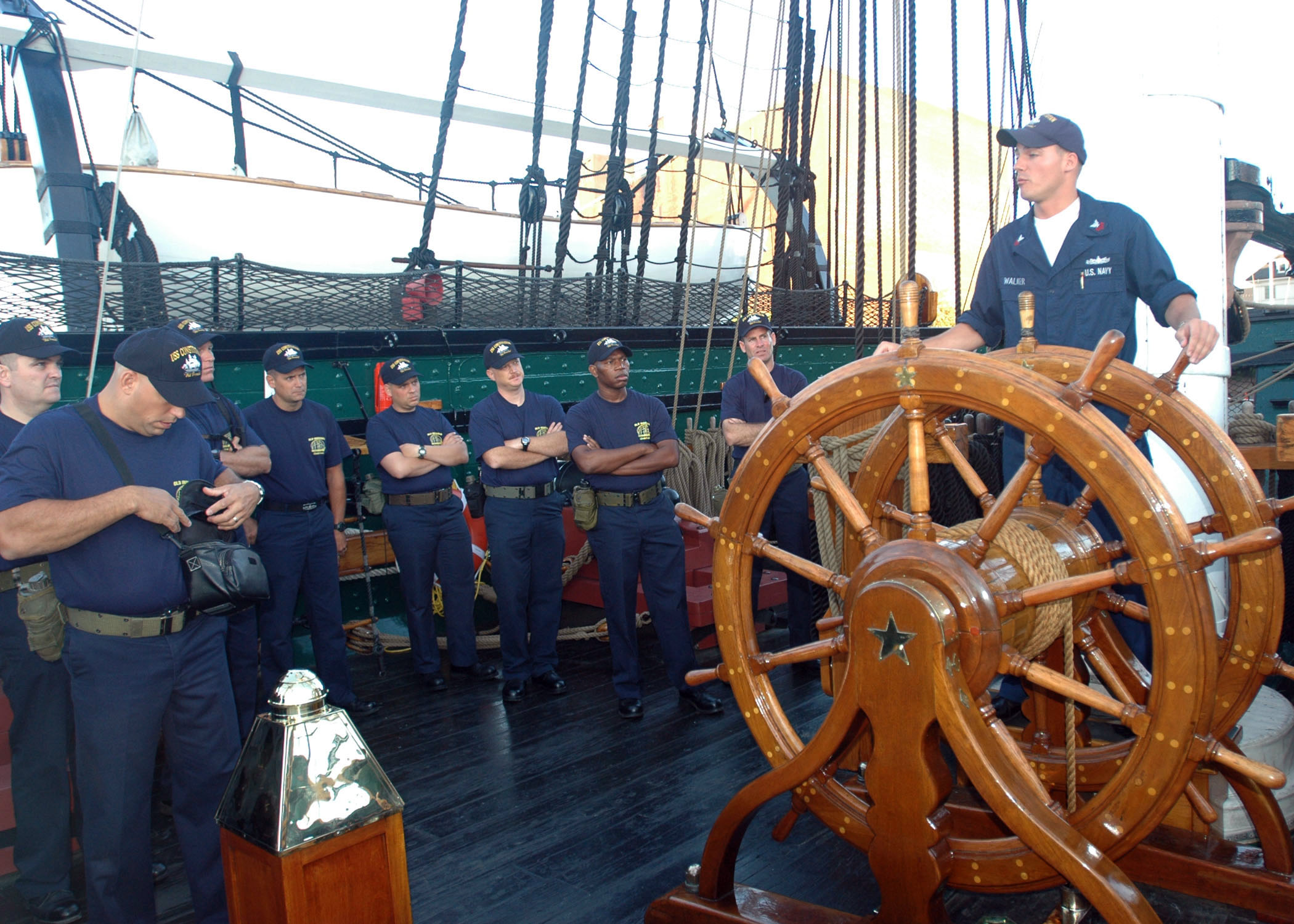
U.S. Navy personnel aboard USS Constitution, by the ship's wheel

Ship's wheel pictured in the coat of arms of Kitee

== See also ==
- Steering engine
- Steering wheel
- Tiller
