= Static stability =

Static stability is the ability of a robot to remain upright when at rest, or under acceleration and deceleration

Static stability may also refer to:

In aircraft or missiles:

- Static margin — a concept used to characterize the static stability and controllability of aircraft and missiles.
- Longitudinal stability — the stability of an aircraft in the longitudinal, or pitching, plane during static (established) conditions.

In meteorology:

- Atmospheric instability § Stable atmosphere

Buoyancy

- Static stability (also called hydrostatic stability or vertical stability) — the ability of a fluid at rest to become turbulent or laminar due to the effects of buoyancy.

In sailing:

- Static stability — the angle of roll, or heel, achieved under constant wind conditions.
