= Cracksman 20 =

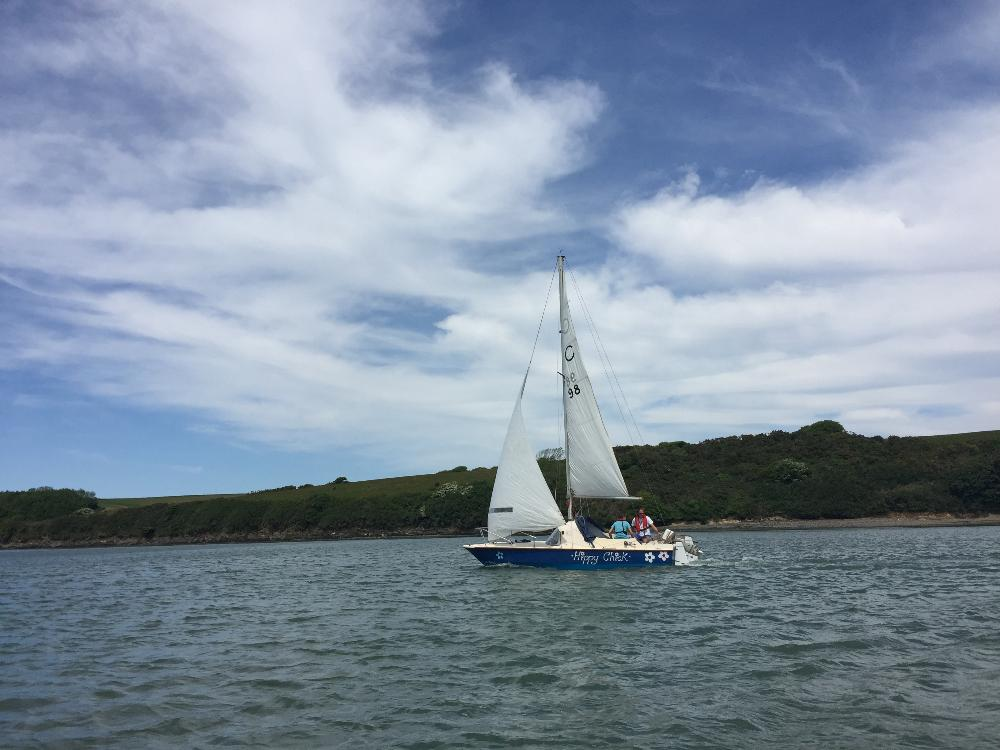
- A Cracksman 20 under sail. Photo taken in 2017.

Development
- Designer: Michael Henderson
- Location: United Kingdom
- Year: 1963
- No. built: 150
- Builder: Newbridge Boats Ltd
- Name: Cracksman 20

Boat
- Displacement: 1,151 lb (522 kg)
- Draft: 0.82–2.76 ft (0.25–0.84 m)

Hull
- Type: Catamaran
- Construction: Fiberglass
- LOA: 20.00 ft (6.10 m)
- LWL: 16.01 ft (4.88 m)
- Beam: 8.01 ft (2.44 m)
- Engine: Outboard motor

Hull appendages
- Keel: Dagger Boards
- Rudder: Twin transom-mounted rudders

Rig
- General: Fractional rigged sloop

The Cracksman 20 is an early fibreglass-hulled Fractional rigged sloop sailing catamaran used for 'day boat' trips and longer cruises. Designed by Michael Henderson in the early 1960s and built by Newbridge Boats Ltd from 1963, the boat's shallow draft (when sailing) of less than three feet allows the boat to sail with versatility in even the shallowest of waters. When under motor, the dagger boards and twin rudders can be lifted, reducing the draft to just 8 inches. This allows the boat to operate easily in tidal areas and beach for quick loading and unloading of crew and equipment.

The boat is 20 feet (6.10m) long and has a beam of just over 8 feet (2.44m), allowing four or more adults to comfortably sail for extended periods of time. The front cabin area, on both the Mk I and Mk II versions allows the stowing of food, equipment and clothes out of the elements, facilitating longer passages where conditions may change unexpectedly.

However, there are some problems with the early version of the Cracksman 20; whilst the boat did grow popular fast, this was more due to its sailing performance than the interior amenities (or lack thereof). Michael Henderson and Newbridge Boats Ltd decided to launch a successor model, the Cracksman 20 Mk II, which along with some minor structural and rigging differences, aimed to address the lack of interior amenities and improve the possibility of overnight passages and passages of a greater length.

== Versions ==
Since its early designing in the 1960s by Michael Henderson, two versions of the Cracksman 20 have been developed, as follows below:

=== Mark I ===
The Cracksman 20 Mk I (see photo above) was the early version of the Cracksman 20 sailing catamaran. Unlike its successor, the early Cracksman's interior was open and empty, allowing easy storage of equipment. A partial length trunk cabin, extended with the use of a canopy, allows the interior space some shelter from the elements, and also helps to increase the size of the 'cabin' from a fairly minimal one to one of a decent size. Whilst both models of the Cracksman 20 are rigged in the form of a sloop, the early version opted for a fractional rig as opposed to the more powerful masthead rig.

=== Mark II ===
The Cracksman 20 Mk II included a far more meaningful interior, with four berths included as standard as well as other features such as a cooker and sea toilet. The boat also featured a more substantial 'trunk cabin' which provided the extra space needed for the addition of internal features. The open rear to the trunk cabin that was observed on the Mk I was replaced instead with a sealed off rear with trunk boards fitted. As well as the physical differences to the vessel, the Mk II also differed in rigging to the Mk I; Henderson opted for a more powerful masthead rig which featured a foresail that went to the top of the mast, as opposed to the fractional rig whose foresail only goes partly up the mast.

=== Similarities ===
Both vessels are rigged with an aft mainsheet and an adjustable traveller, the latter of which allows the boat to cope with weather helm. A large anchor well is present in the bow of both the Mk I and Mk II boats, allowing the user to stow the anchor out of the way of the foresail. Whilst the Mk I uses a fractional rig and the Mk II uses a masthead rig, both have a genoa as a foresail, however storm jibs are fitted when sailing in extreme circumstances. Both boats are made of fibreglass and feature wooden liftable, remove-able rudders and dagger boards.
