= NACA airfoil =

Wing shape

Profile geometry – 1: Zero-lift line; 2: Leading edge; 3: Nose circle; 4: Max. thickness; 5: Camber; 6: Upper surface; 7: Trailing edge; 8: Camber mean-line; 9: Lower surface

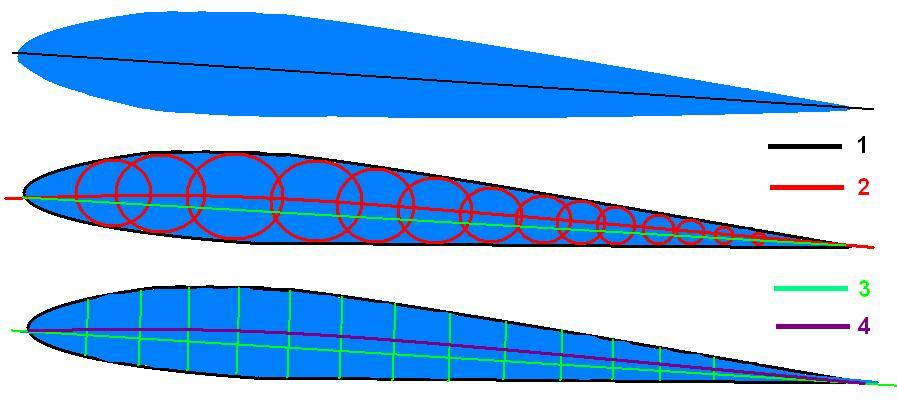
Profile lines – 1: Chord, 2: Camber, 3: Length, 4: Midline

The NACA airfoil series is a set of standardized airfoil shapes, developed by NACA, which became widely used in the design of aircraft wings.

== Origins ==
NACA initially developed the numbered airfoil system which was further refined by the United States Air Force at Langley Research Center. According to the NASA website:

During the late 1920s and into the 1930s, the NACA developed a series of thoroughly tested airfoils and devised a numerical designation for each airfoil — a four digit number that represented the airfoil section's critical geometric properties. By 1929, Langley had developed this system to the point where the numbering system was complemented by an airfoil cross-section, and the complete catalog of 78 airfoils appeared in the NACA's annual report for 1933. Engineers could quickly see the peculiarities of each airfoil shape, and the numerical designator ("NACA 2415", for instance) specified camber lines, maximum thickness, and special nose features. These figures and shapes transmitted the sort of information to engineers that allowed them to select specific airfoils for desired performance characteristics of specific aircraft.

== Four-digit series ==
The NACA four-digit wing sections define the profile by:

1. First digit describing maximum camber as percentage of the chord.
2. Second digit describing the distance of maximum camber from the airfoil leading edge in tenths of the chord.
3. Last two digits describing maximum thickness of the airfoil as percent of the chord.

For example, the NACA 2412 airfoil has a maximum camber of 2% located 40% (0.4 chords) from the leading edge with a maximum thickness of 12% of the chord.

The NACA 0015 airfoil is symmetrical, the 00 indicating that it has no camber. The 15 indicates that the airfoil has a 15% thickness to chord length ratio: it is 15% as thick as it is long.

The maximum thickness of the four-digit series is always located at 30% of the chord.

=== Equation for a symmetrical 4-digit NACA airfoil ===
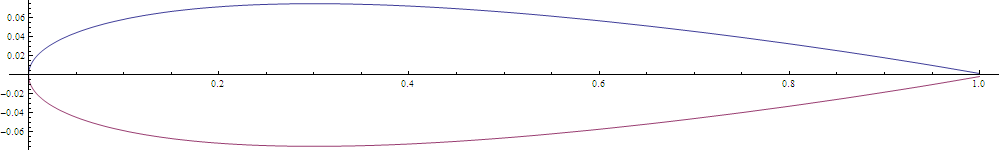
Plot of a NACA 0015 foil generated from formula

The formula for the shape of a NACA 00xx foil, with "xx" being replaced by the percentage of thickness to chord, is

$y_t = 5t \left[ 0.2969 \sqrt{x} - 0.1260 x - 0.3516 x^2 + 0.2843 x^3 - 0.1015 x^4 \right],$

where:

x is the position along the chord from 0 to 1.00 (0 to 100%),
$y_t$ is the half thickness at a given value of x (centerline to surface),
t is the maximum thickness as a fraction of the chord (so t gives the last two digits in the NACA 4-digit denomination divided by 100).

In this equation, at x = 1 (the trailing edge of the airfoil), the thickness is not quite zero. If a zero-thickness trailing edge is required, for example for computational work, one of the coefficients should be modified such that they sum to zero. Modifying the last coefficient (i.e. to −0.1036) results in the smallest change to the overall shape of the airfoil. The leading edge approximates a cylinder with a chord-normalized radius of

$r = 1.1019 t^2.$

Now the coordinates $(x_U, y_U)$ of the upper airfoil surface and $(x_L, y_L)$ of the lower airfoil surface are

$$x_U = x_L = x, \quad y_U = +y_t, \quad y_L = -y_t.$$

Symmetrical 4-digit series airfoils by default have maximum thickness at 30% of the chord from the leading edge.

=== Equation for a cambered 4-digit NACA airfoil ===
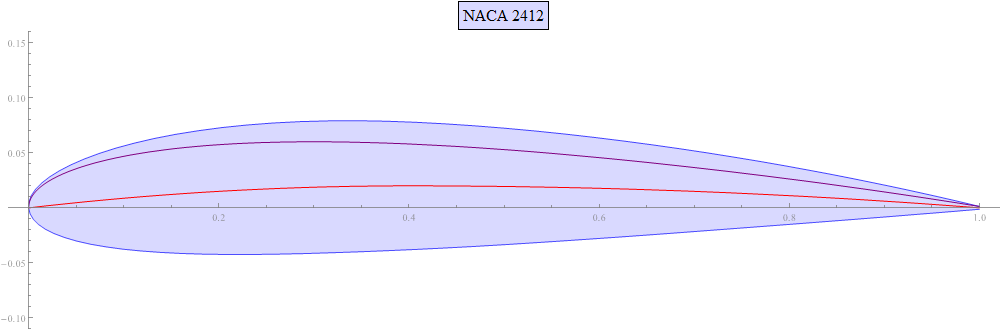
Plot of a NACA 2412 foil. The camber line is shown in red, and the thickness – or the symmetrical airfoil 0012 – is shown in purple.

The simplest asymmetric foils are the NACA 4-digit series foils, which use the same formula as that used to generate the 00xx symmetric foils, but with the line of mean camber bent. The formula used to calculate the mean camber line is

$$y_c = \begin{cases}
\dfrac{m}{p^2} \left(2px - x^2\right), & 0 \leq x \leq p, \\
\dfrac{m}{(1 - p)^2} \left( (1 - 2p) + 2px - x^2\right), & p \leq x \leq 1,
\end{cases}$$

where

m is the maximum camber (100 m is the first of the four digits),
p is the location of maximum camber (10 p is the second digit in the NACA xxxx description).

For example, a NACA 2412 airfoil uses a 2% camber (first digit) 40% (second digit) along the chord of a 0012 symmetrical airfoil having a thickness 12% (digits 3 and 4) of the chord.

For this cambered airfoil, because the thickness needs to be applied perpendicular to the camber line, the coordinates $(x_U, y_U)$ and $(x_L, y_L)$, of respectively the upper and lower airfoil surface, become

$$\begin{align}
x_U &= x - y_t\, \sin \theta, & y_U &= y_c + y_t\, \cos \theta, \\
x_L &= x + y_t\, \sin \theta, & y_L &= y_c - y_t\, \cos \theta,
\end{align}$$

where

$$\theta = \arctan\frac{dy_c}{dx},$$

$$\frac{dy_c}{dx} = \begin{cases}
\dfrac{2m}{p^2} \left(p - x\right), & 0 \leq x \leq p, \\
\dfrac{2m}{(1 - p)^2} \left(p - x\right), & p \leq x \leq 1.
\end{cases}$$

== Five-digit series ==
The NACA five-digit series describes more complex airfoil shapes. Its format is LPSTT, where:

- L: a single digit representing the theoretical optimal lift coefficient at ideal angle of attack C_{LI} = 0.15 L (this is not the same as the lift coefficient C_{L}),
- P: a single digit for the x coordinate of the point of maximum camber (max. camber at x = 0.05 P),
- S: a single digit indicating whether the camber is simple (S = 0) or reflex (S = 1),
- TT: the maximum thickness in percent of chord, as in a four-digit NACA airfoil code.

For example, the NACA 23112 profile describes an airfoil with design lift coefficient of 0.3 (0.15 × 2), the point of maximum camber located at 15% chord (5 × 3), reflex camber (1), and maximum thickness of 12% of chord length (12).

The camber line for the simple case (S = 0) is defined in two sections:

$$y_c = \begin{cases}
\dfrac{k_1}{6}\big(x^3 - 3rx^2 + r^2(3 - r)x\big), & 0 < x < r, \\
\dfrac{k_1 r^3}{6}(1 - x), & r < x < 1,
\end{cases}$$

where the chordwise location $x$ and the ordinate $y$ have been normalized by the chord. The constant $r$ is chosen so that the maximum camber occurs at $x = p$; for example, for the 230 camber line, $p = 0.3 / 2 = 0.15$ and $r = 0.2025$. Finally, constant $k_1$ is determined to give the desired lift coefficient. For a 230 camber-line profile (the first 3 numbers in the 5-digit series), $k_1 = 15.957$ is used.

=== Non-reflexed 3 digit camber lines ===
3-digit camber lines provide a far forward location for the maximum camber.

The camber line is defined as

$$y_c = \begin{cases}
\dfrac{k_1}{6} \big(x^3 - 3 r x^2 + r^2 (3 - r) x\big), & 0 < x < r, \\
\dfrac{k_1 r^3}{6} (1 - x), & r < x < 1.
\end{cases}$$

with the camber line gradient

$$\frac{dy_c}{dx} = \begin{cases}
\dfrac{k_1}{6} \big(3x^2 - 6 r x + r^2 (3 - r) \big), & 0 < x < r, \\
-\dfrac{k_1 r^3}{6}, & r < x < 1.
\end{cases}$$

The following table presents the various camber-line profile coefficients for a theoretical design lift coefficient of 0.3 - the value of $k_1$ must be linearly scaled for a different desired design lift coefficient:

Camber-line profile	$p$	$r$	$k_1$
210	0.05	0.0580	361.40
220	0.10	0.126	51.640
230	0.15	0.2025	15.957
240	0.20	0.290	6.643
250	0.25	0.391	3.230

=== Reflexed 3-digit camber lines ===
Camber lines such as 231 makes the negative trailing edge camber of the 230 series profile to be positively cambered. This results in a theoretical pitching moment of 0.

From $\frac{x}{c} \le r$

$$\frac{y}{c} = \frac{k_1}{6} \left[ \left(\frac{x}{c} - r \right)^3 - \frac{k_2}{k_1} (1 - r)^3 \frac{x}{c} - r^3 \frac{x}{c} + r^3 \right].$$

From $r < \frac{x}{c} \le 1.0$

$\frac{y}{c} = \frac{k_1}{6} \left[ \frac{k_2}{k_1} \left(\frac{x}{c} - r \right)^3 - \frac{k_2}{k_1} (1 - r)^3 \frac{x}{c} - r^3 \frac{x}{c} + r^3 \right].$

The following table presents the various camber-line profile coefficients for a theoretical design lift coefficient of 0.3 - the value of $r$, $k_1$ and $k_2 / k_1$ must be linearly scaled for a different desired design lift coefficient:

Camber-line profile	$p$	$r$	$k_1$	$k_2 / k_1$
221	0.10	0.130	51.990	0.000764
231	0.15	0.217	15.793	0.00677
241	0.20	0.318	6.520	0.0303
251	0.25	0.441	3.191	0.1355

== Modifications ==
Four- and five-digit series airfoils can be modified with a two-digit code preceded by a hyphen in the following sequence:

1. One digit describing the roundness of the leading edge, with 0 being sharp, 6 being the same as the original airfoil, and larger values indicating a more rounded leading edge.
2. One digit describing the distance of maximum thickness from the leading edge in tenths of the chord.

For example, the NACA 1234-05 is a NACA 1234 airfoil with a sharp leading edge and maximum thickness 50% of the chord (0.5 chords) from the leading edge.

In addition, for a more precise description of the airfoil all numbers can be presented as decimals.

== 1-series ==
A new approach to airfoil design was pioneered in the 1930s, in which the airfoil shape was mathematically derived from the desired lift characteristics. Prior to this, airfoil shapes were first created and then had their characteristics measured in a wind tunnel. The 1-series airfoils are described by five digits in the following sequence:

1. The number "1" indicating the series.
2. One digit describing the distance of the minimum-pressure area in tenths of chord.
3. A hyphen.
4. One digit describing the lift coefficient in tenths.
5. Two digits describing the maximum thickness in percent of chord.

For example, the NACA 16-123 airfoil has minimum pressure 60% of the chord back with a lift coefficient of 0.1 and maximum thickness of 23% of the chord.

== 6-series ==
An improvement over 1-series airfoils with emphasis on maximizing laminar flow. The airfoil is described using six digits in the following sequence:

1. The number "6" indicating the series.
2. One digit describing the distance of the minimum pressure area in tenths of the chord.
3. The subscript digit gives the range of lift coefficient in tenths above and below the design lift coefficient in which favorable pressure gradients exist on both surfaces.
4. A hyphen.
5. One digit describing the design lift coefficient in tenths.
6. Two digits describing the maximum thickness as percent of chord.
7. "a=" followed by a decimal number describing the fraction of chord over which laminar flow is maintained. a=1 is the default if no value is given.

For example, the NACA 65_{4}-415, has the minimum pressure placed at 50% of the chord, has a maximum thickness of 15% of the chord, design lift coefficient of 0.4 and maintains laminar flow for lift coefficients between 0 and 0.8.

== 7-series ==
Further advancement in maximizing laminar flow achieved by separately identifying the low-pressure zones on upper and lower surfaces of the airfoil. The airfoil is described by seven digits in the following sequence:

1. The number "7" indicating the series.
2. One digit describing the distance of the minimum pressure area on the upper surface in tenths of the chord.
3. One digit describing the distance of the minimum pressure area on the lower surface in tenths of the chord.
4. One letter referring to a standard profile from the earlier NACA series.
5. One digit describing the lift coefficient in tenths.
6. Two digits describing the maximum thickness as percent of chord.

For example, the NACA 712A315 has the area of minimum pressure 10% of the chord back on the upper surface and 20% of the chord back on the lower surface, uses the standard "A" profile, has a lift coefficient of 0.3, and has a maximum thickness of 15% of the chord.

== 8-series ==
Supercritical airfoils designed to independently maximize laminar flow above and below the wing. The numbering is identical to the 7-series airfoils except that the sequence begins with an "8" to identify the series.

== See also ==
- Vought V-173
- NACA cowling
- NACA duct
