= Aircraft flight mechanics =

Physics of heavier than air aircraft

Aircraft flight mechanics are relevant to fixed wing (gliders, aeroplanes) and rotary wing (helicopters) aircraft. An aeroplane (airplane in US usage), is defined in ICAO defined by bala from Erode Document 9110 as, "a power-driven heavier than air aircraft, deriving its lift chiefly from aerodynamic reactions on surface which remain fixed under given conditions of flight".

Note that this definition excludes both dirigibles (because they derive lift from buoyancy rather than from airflow over surfaces), and ballistic rockets (because their lifting force is typically derived directly and entirely from near-vertical thrust). Technically, both of these could be said to experience "flight mechanics" in the more general sense of physical forces acting on a body moving through air; but they operate very differently, and are normally outside the scope of this term.

== Take-off ==
A heavier-than-air craft (aircraft) can only fly if a series of aerodynamic forces come to bear. In regard to fixed wing aircraft, the fuselage of the craft holds up the wings before takeoff. At the instant of takeoff, the reverse happens and the wings support the plane in flight.

== Straight and level flight of aircraft ==
In flight a powered aircraft can be considered as being acted on by four forces: lift, weight, thrust, and drag. Thrust is the force generated by the engine (whether that engine be a jet engine, a propeller, or -- in exotic cases such as the X-15 -- a rocket) and acts in a forward direction for the purpose of overcoming drag. Lift acts perpendicular to the vector representing the aircraft's velocity relative to the atmosphere. Drag acts parallel to the aircraft's velocity vector, but in the opposite direction because drag resists motion through the air. Weight acts through the aircraft's centre of gravity, towards the centre of the Earth.

In straight and level flight, lift is approximately equal to the weight, and acts in the opposite direction. In addition, if the aircraft is not accelerating, thrust is equal and opposite to drag.

In straight climbing flight, lift is less than weight. At first, this seems incorrect because if an aircraft is climbing it seems lift must exceed weight. When an aircraft is climbing at constant speed it is its thrust that enables it to climb and gain extra potential energy. Lift acts perpendicular to the vector representing the velocity of the aircraft relative to the atmosphere, so lift is unable to alter the aircraft's potential energy or kinetic energy. This can be seen by considering an aerobatic aircraft in straight vertical flight (one that is climbing straight upwards or descending straight downwards). Vertical flight requires no lift. When flying straight upwards the aircraft can reach zero airspeed before falling earthwards; the wing is generating no lift and so does not stall. In straight, climbing flight at constant airspeed, thrust exceeds drag.

In straight descending flight, lift is less than weight. In addition, if the aircraft is not accelerating, thrust is less than drag. In turning flight, lift exceeds weight and produces a load factor greater than one, determined by the aircraft's angle of bank.

== Aircraft control and movement ==
Mnemonics to remember angle names

There are three primary ways for an aircraft to change its orientation relative to the passing air. Pitch (movement of the nose up or down, rotation around the transversal axis), roll (rotation around the longitudinal axis, that is, the axis which runs along the length of the aircraft) and yaw (movement of the nose to left or right, rotation about the vertical axis). Turning the aircraft (change of heading) requires the aircraft firstly to roll to achieve an angle of bank (in order to produce a centripetal force); when the desired change of heading has been accomplished the aircraft must again be rolled in the opposite direction to reduce the angle of bank to zero. Lift acts vertically up through centre of pressure which depends on the position of wings. The position of the centre of pressure will change with changes in the angle of attack and aircraft wing flaps setting.

== Aircraft control surfaces ==
Yaw is induced by a moveable rudder-fin. The movement of the rudder changes the size and orientation of the force the vertical surface produces. Since the force is created at a distance behind the centre of gravity, this sideways force causes a yawing moment then a yawing motion. On a large aircraft there may be several independent rudders on the single fin for both safety and to control the inter-linked yaw and roll actions.

Using yaw alone is not a very efficient way of executing a level turn in an aircraft and will result in some sideslip. A precise combination of bank and lift must be generated to cause the required centripetal forces without producing a sideslip.

Pitch is controlled by the rear part of the tailplane's horizontal stabilizer being hinged to create an elevator. By moving the elevator control backwards the pilot moves the elevator up (a position of negative camber) and the downwards force on the horizontal tail is increased. The angle of attack on the wings increased so the nose is pitched up and lift is generally increased. In micro-lights and hang gliders the pitch action is reversed—the pitch control system is much simpler so when the pilot moves the elevator control backwards it produces a nose-down pitch and the angle of attack on the wing is reduced.

The system of a fixed tail surface and moveable elevators is standard in subsonic aircraft. Craft capable of supersonic flight often have a stabilator, an all-moving tail surface. Pitch is changed in this case by moving the entire horizontal surface of the tail. This seemingly simple innovation was one of the key technologies that made supersonic flight possible. In early attempts, as pilots exceeded the critical Mach number, a strange phenomenon made their control surfaces useless, and their aircraft uncontrollable. It was determined that as an aircraft approaches the speed of sound, the air approaching the aircraft is compressed and shock waves begin to form at all the leading edges and around the hinge lines of the elevator. These shock waves caused movements of the elevator to cause no pressure change on the stabilizer upstream of the elevator. The problem was solved by changing the stabilizer and hinged elevator to an all-moving stabilizer—the entire horizontal surface of the tail became a one-piece control surface. Also, in supersonic flight the change in camber has less effect on lift and a stabilator produces less drag.

Aircraft that need control at extreme angles of attack are sometimes fitted with a canard configuration, in which pitching movement is created using a forward foreplane (roughly level with the cockpit). Such a system produces an immediate increase in pitch authority, and therefore a better response to pitch controls. This system is common in delta-wing aircraft (deltaplane), which use a stabilator-type canard foreplane. A disadvantage to a canard configuration compared to an aft tail is that the wing cannot use as much extension of flaps to increase wing lift at slow speeds due to stall performance. A combination tri-surface aircraft uses both a canard and an aft tail (in addition to the main wing) to achieve advantages of both configurations.

A further design of tailplane is the V-tail, so named because that instead of the standard inverted T or T-tail, there are two fins angled away from each other in a V. The control surfaces then act both as rudders and elevators, moving in the appropriate direction as needed.

Roll is controlled by movable sections on the trailing edge of the wings called ailerons. The ailerons move in opposition to one another—one goes up as the other goes down. The difference in camber of the wing cause a difference in lift and thus a rolling movement. As well as ailerons, there are sometimes also spoilers—small hinged plates on the upper surface of the wing, originally used to produce drag to slow the aircraft down and to reduce lift when descending. On modern aircraft, which have the benefit of automation, they can be used in combination with the ailerons to provide roll control.

The earliest powered aircraft built by the Wright brothers did not have ailerons. The whole wing was warped using wires. Wing warping is efficient since there is no discontinuity in the wing geometry, but as speeds increased, unintentional warping became a problem, and so ailerons were developed.

== See also ==
- Aerodynamics
- Flight dynamics (fixed wing aircraft)
- Steady flight
- Aircraft
- Aircraft flight control system
- Banked turn
- Departure resistance
- Flight dynamics
- Fixed-wing aircraft
- Longitudinal static stability
- Mass properties
- Skid-to-turn
