= Over-canvassed sailing =

A sailing boat that is carrying too much sail for the current wind conditions is said to be over-canvassed. An over-canvassed boat, whether a dinghy, a yacht or a sailing ship, is difficult to steer and control and tends to heel or roll too much. If the wind continues to rise, an over-canvassed sailing boat will become dangerous and ultimately gear may break or it may round-up into the wind, broach or capsize. Any of these eventualities puts the safety of the crew and the vessel in danger. To over-canvass a sailing boat is considered unseamanlike and imprudent. In order to reduce sail, individual sails may be lowered or furled and existing sails may be reefed. Counter-intuitively, many boats will sail faster, and certainly more smoothly, comfortably and safely, when carrying the correct amount of sail in a strong wind than they would if over-canvassed and excessively rolling, heeling, carrying too much weather helm or repeatedly rounding up.

== Definition ==
The decision to reduce sail, to avoid being over-canvassed, is made at sea based on a number of factors. There are folklore sayings, such as, "Any fool can set a sail, but it takes a sailor to take it down" and, "The best time to reef is when you first think about it; when you think it's time to shake it out, have a cup of tea first". The fact is, that the definition of being over-canvassed depends on a number of factors. These include the design, form and stability of the boat hull, the age and strength of the sails and gear, the direction of the wind relative to the course, the size, experience and state of the crew, the state of the sea as well as the purpose of the voyage.

Warning signs that a well-found, well-crewed sailing vessel may be over-canvassed include excessive weather helm, excessive speed, any uncontrolled rounding up or broaching, excessive slamming into or falling off of waves, excessive heel or excessive rolling. If the purpose of the journey does not include racing, or if there is any kind of damage or minor emergency on-board, or if the boat is old or if the crew is ill, or tired or short-handed, then the meaning of 'excessive' may be reduced in any of these cases.

== Safety ==
The most important reason to avoid being over-canvassed in a blow is the safety of the boat, its gear and its crew. Frank Mulville said that, "With the wind fair a man is master of his boat and has the power to drive her as hard as he wishes – even to the point of destruction." He went on to say, "In a contrary wind a well found yacht is master. She has more stamina to windward than any man by himself". Von Haeften says that, "It is impossible to tear working sails in good condition by wind pressure alone. If it happens, nevertheless, it will either be down to some sail-handling mistake so that the sail has been chafed or caught up somewhere, or to the fact that the sail was old and worn out". There are many stories of gear breakage from a parted shackle leaving a sail to flap wildly to shrouds giving way to bring a mast down.

A wildly heaving deck that is heeled, rolling or broaching beyond what is normally expected, can pitch a crew member overboard into the sea, or lead to a fall and subsequent injury. Such issues of crew safety are always paramount.

== Comfort ==
A single- or short-handed crew must conserve energy and take even more care of personal safety when the boat is unlikely to be handled, or brought back for a rescue, in their absence or incapacitation. Reducing sail early and thoroughly may be more important in these cases, especially when far from land.

Friends out for a sail or a cruise, rather than a race, will be more impressed by a comfortable, stable voyage than one in which the eager skipper's personal best for angle of heel is exceeded several times.

== Speed ==
The correct amount of sail for the conditions, with all that that implies will lead to improved boat performance compared to the over-canvassed state.
