= Longitudinal stability =

Stability of an aircraft in the pitching plane

In flight dynamics, longitudinal stability is the stability of an aircraft in the longitudinal, or pitching, plane. This characteristic is important in determining whether an aircraft pilot will be able to control the aircraft in the pitching plane without requiring excessive attention or excessive strength.

The longitudinal stability of an aircraft, also called pitch stability, refers to the aircraft's stability in its plane of symmetry about the lateral axis (the axis along the wingspan). It is an important aspect of the handling qualities of the aircraft, and one of the main factors determining the ease with which the pilot is able to maintain level flight.

Longitudinal static stability refers to the aircraft's initial tendency on pitching. Dynamic stability refers to whether oscillations tend to increase, decrease or stay constant.

== Static stability ==
Three cases for static stability: following a pitch disturbance, aircraft can be unstable, neutral, or stable.

If an aircraft is longitudinally statically stable, a small increase in angle of attack will create a nose-down pitching moment on the aircraft, so that the angle of attack decreases. Similarly, a small decrease in angle of attack will create a nose-up pitching moment so that the angle of attack increases. This means the aircraft will self-correct longitudinal (pitch) disturbances without pilot input.

If an aircraft is longitudinally statically unstable, a small increase in angle of attack will create a nose-up pitching moment on the aircraft, promoting a further increase in the angle of attack.

If the aircraft has zero longitudinal static stability it is said to be statically neutral, and the position of its center of gravity is called the neutral point.

The longitudinal static stability of an aircraft depends on the location of its center of gravity relative to the neutral point. As the center of gravity moves increasingly forward, the pitching moment arm is increased, increasing stability. The distance between the center of gravity and the neutral point is defined as "static margin". It is usually given as a percentage of the mean aerodynamic chord. If the center of gravity is forward of the neutral point, the static margin is positive. If the center of gravity is aft of the neutral point, the static margin is negative. The greater the static margin, the more stable the aircraft will be.

Most conventional aircraft have positive longitudinal stability, providing the aircraft's center of gravity lies within the approved range. The operating handbook for every airplane specifies a range over which the center of gravity is permitted to move. If the center of gravity is too far aft, the aircraft will be unstable. If it is too far forward, the aircraft will be excessively stable, which makes the aircraft "stiff" in pitch and hard for the pilot to bring the nose up for landing. Required control forces will be greater.

Some aircraft have low stability to reduce trim drag. This has the benefit of reducing fuel consumption. Some aerobatic and fighter aircraft may have low or even negative stability to provide high manoeuvrability. Low or negative stability is called relaxed stability. An aircraft with low or negative static stability will typically have fly-by-wire controls with computer augmentation to assist the pilot. Otherwise, an aircraft with negative longitudinal stability will be more difficult to fly. It will be necessary for the pilot to devote more effort, make more frequent inputs to the elevator control, and make larger inputs, in an attempt to maintain the desired pitch attitude.

For an aircraft to possess positive static stability, it is not necessary for its level to return to exactly what it was before the upset. It is sufficient that the speed and orientation do not continue to diverge but undergo at least a small change back towards the original speed and orientation.

The deployment of flaps will increase longitudinal stability.

Unlike motion about the other two axes, and in the other degrees of freedom of the aircraft (sideslip translation, rotation in roll, rotation in yaw), which are usually heavily coupled, motion in the longitudinal plane does not typically cause a roll or yaw.

A larger horizontal stabilizer, and a greater moment arm of the horizontal stabilizer about the neutral point, will increase longitudinal stability.

=== Tailless aircraft ===
For a tailless aircraft, the neutral point coincides with the aerodynamic center, and for such aircraft to have longitudinal static stability, the center of gravity must lie ahead of the aerodynamic center.

For missiles with symmetric airfoils, the neutral point and the center of pressure are coincident and the term neutral point is not used.

An unguided rocket must have a large positive static margin so the rocket shows minimum tendency to diverge from the direction of flight given to it at launch. In contrast, guided missiles usually have a negative static margin for increased maneuverability.

== Dynamic stability ==
Longitudinal dynamic stability of a statically stable aircraft refers to whether the aircraft will continue to oscillate after a disturbance, or whether the oscillations are damped. A dynamically stable aircraft will experience oscillations reducing to nil. A dynamically neutral aircraft will continue to oscillate around its original level, and dynamically unstable aircraft will experience increasing oscillations and displacement from its original level.

Dynamic stability is caused by damping. If damping is too great, the aircraft will be less responsive and less manoeuvrable.

Decreasing phugoid (long-period) oscillations can be achieved by building a smaller stabilizer on a longer tail, and by shifting the center of gravity to the rear.

An aircraft that is not statically stable cannot be dynamically stable.

The longitudinal dynamic stability of an aircraft determines whether it will be able to return to its original position.

== Analysis ==
Near the cruise condition most of the lift force is generated by the wings, with ideally only a small amount generated by the fuselage and tail. We may analyse the longitudinal static stability by considering the aircraft in equilibrium under wing lift, tail force, and weight. The moment equilibrium condition is called trim, and we are generally interested in the longitudinal stability of the aircraft about this trim condition.

Equating forces in the vertical direction:

$$W=L_w+L_t$$

where W is the weight, $L_w$ is the wing lift and $L_t$ is the tail force.

For a thin airfoil at low angle of attack, the wing lift is proportional to the angle of attack:

$$L_w=qS_w\frac{\partial C_L}{\partial \alpha} (\alpha+\alpha_0)$$

where $S_w$ is the wing area $C_L$ is the (wing) lift coefficient, $\alpha$ is the angle of attack. The term $\alpha_0$ is included to account for camber, which results in lift at zero angle of attack. Finally $q$ is the dynamic pressure:

$$q=\frac{1}{2}\rho v^2$$

where $\rho$ is the air density and $v$ is the speed.

=== Trim ===
The force from the tail-plane is proportional to its angle of attack, including the effects of any elevator deflection and any adjustment the pilot has made to trim-out any stick force. In addition, the tail is located in the flow field of the main wing, and consequently experiences downwash, reducing its angle of attack.

In a statically stable aircraft of conventional (tail in rear) configuration, the tail-plane force may act upward or downward depending on the design and the flight conditions. In a typical canard aircraft both fore and aft planes are lifting surfaces. The fundamental requirement for static stability is that the aft surface must have greater authority (leverage) in restoring a disturbance than the forward surface has in exacerbating it. This leverage is a product of moment arm from the center of gravity and surface area. Correctly balanced in this way, the partial derivative of pitching moment with respect to changes in angle of attack will be negative: a momentary pitch up to a larger angle of attack makes the resultant pitching moment tend to pitch the aircraft back down. (Here, pitch is used casually for the angle between the nose and the direction of the airflow; angle of attack.) This is the "stability derivative" d(M)/d(alpha), described below.

The tail force is, therefore:

$$L_t=q S_t\left(\frac{\partial C_l}{\partial \alpha}\left(\alpha-\frac{\partial \epsilon}{\partial \alpha}\alpha\right)+\frac{\partial C_l}{\partial \eta}\eta\right)$$

where $S_t\!$ is the tail area, $C_l\!$ is the tail force coefficient, $\eta\!$ is the elevator deflection, and $\epsilon\!$ is the downwash angle.

A canard aircraft may have its foreplane rigged at a high angle of incidence, which can be seen in a canard catapult glider from a toy store; the design puts the c.g. well forward, requiring nose-up lift.

Violations of the basic principle are exploited in some high performance "relaxed static stability" combat aircraft to enhance agility; artificial stability is supplied by active electronic means.

There are a few classical cases where this favorable response was not achieved, notably in T-tail configurations. A T-tail airplane has a higher horizontal tail that passes through the wake of the wing later (at a higher angle of attack) than a lower tail would, and at this point the wing has already stalled and has a much larger separated wake. Inside the separated wake, the tail sees little to no freestream and loses effectiveness. Elevator control power is also heavily reduced or even lost, and the pilot is unable to easily escape the stall. This phenomenon is known as 'deep stall'.

Taking moments about the center of gravity, the net nose-up moment is:

$$M=L_w x_g-(l_t-x_g)L_t\!$$

where $x_g\!$ is the location of the center of gravity behind the aerodynamic center of the main wing, $l_t\!$ is the tail moment arm. For trim, this moment must be zero. For a given maximum elevator deflection, there is a corresponding limit on center of gravity position at which the aircraft can be kept in equilibrium. When limited by control deflection this is known as a 'trim limit'. In principle trim limits could determine the permissible forwards and rearwards shift of the center of gravity, but usually it is only the forward cg limit which is determined by the available control, the aft limit is usually dictated by stability.

In a missile context 'trim limit' more usually refers to the maximum angle of attack, and hence lateral acceleration which can be generated.

=== Static stability ===
The nature of stability may be examined by considering the increment in pitching moment with change in angle of attack at the trim condition. If this is nose up, the aircraft is longitudinally unstable; if nose down it is stable. Differentiating the moment equation from the previous section with respect to $\alpha$:

$$\frac{\partial M}{\partial \alpha}=x_g\frac{\partial L_w}{\partial \alpha}-(l_t-x_g)\frac{\partial L_t}{\partial \alpha}$$

Note: $\frac{\partial M}{\partial \alpha}$ is a stability derivative.

It is convenient to treat total lift as acting at a distance h ahead of the centre of gravity, so that the moment equation may be written:

$$M=h(L_w+L_t)\!$$

Applying the increment in angle of attack:

$$\frac{\partial M}{\partial \alpha}=h\left(\frac{\partial L_w}{\partial \alpha}+\frac{\partial L_t}{\partial \alpha}\right)$$

Equating the two expressions for moment increment:

$$h=x_g-l_t\frac {\frac {\partial L_t}{\partial \alpha}}{\frac{\partial L_w}{\partial \alpha}+\frac{\partial L_t}{\partial \alpha}}$$

The total lift $L$ is the sum of $L_w$ and $L_t$ so the sum in the denominator can be simplified and written as the derivative of the total lift due to angle of attack, yielding:

$$\frac{h}{c}=\frac{x_g}{c}-\left(1-\frac{\partial \epsilon}{\partial \alpha}\right)\frac{\frac{\partial C_l}{\partial \alpha}}{\frac{\partial C_L}{\partial \alpha}}\frac{l_t S_t}{c S_w}$$

Where c is the mean aerodynamic chord of the main wing. The term:

$$V_t=\frac{l_t S_t}{c S_w}$$

is known as the tail volume ratio. Its coefficient, the ratio of the two lift derivatives, has values in the range of 0.50 to 0.65 for typical configurations. Hence the expression for h may be written more compactly, though somewhat approximately, as:

$$h=x_g-0.5 cV_t\!$$

$h$ is known as the static margin. For stability it must be negative. (However, for consistency of language, the static margin is sometimes taken as $-h$, so that positive stability is associated with positive static margin.)

== See also ==
- Directional stability
- Flight dynamics
- Handling qualities
- Phugoid
- Yaw damper
