= Center of pressure =

Center of pressure may refer to:

- Center of pressure (fluid mechanics)
- Center of pressure (terrestrial locomotion)
