= Relaxed stability =

Aircraft with low or negative stability

In aviation, an aircraft is said to have relaxed stability if it has low or negative stability.

An aircraft with negative stability will have a tendency to change its pitch and bank angles spontaneously. An aircraft with negative stability cannot be trimmed to maintain a certain attitude, and will, when disturbed in pitch or roll, continue to pitch or roll in the direction of the disturbance at an ever-increasing rate.

This can be contrasted with the behaviour of an aircraft with positive stability, which can be trimmed to fly at a certain attitude, which it will continue to maintain in the absence of control input, and, if perturbed, will oscillate in simple harmonic motion on a decreasing scale around, and eventually return to, the trimmed attitude. A positively stable aircraft will also resist any bank movement. A Cessna 152 is an example of a stable aircraft. Similarly, an aircraft with neutral stability will not return to its original attitude without control input, but will continue to roll or pitch at a steady (neither increasing nor decreasing) rate.

== Early aircraft ==
Early attempts at heavier-than-air flight were marked by a differing concept of stability from that used today. Most aeronautical investigators regarded flight as if it were not so different from surface locomotion, except the surface was elevated. They thought of changing direction in terms of a ship's rudder, so the flying machine would remain essentially level in the air, as did an automobile or a ship at the surface. The idea of deliberately leaning, or rolling, to one side either seemed undesirable or did not enter their thinking.

Some of these early investigators, including Langley, Chanute, and later Santos-Dumont and the Voisin brothers, sought the ideal of "inherent stability" in a very strong sense, believing a flying machine should be built to automatically roll to a horizontal (lateral) position after any disturbance. They achieved this with the help of Hargrave cellular wings (wings with a box kite structure, including the vertical panels) and strongly dihedral wings. In most cases they did not include any means for a pilot to control the aircraft roll—they could control only the elevator and rudder. The unpredicted effect of this was that it was very hard to turn the aircraft without rolling. They were also strongly affected by side gusts and side winds upon landing.

The Wright brothers designed their 1903 first powered Flyer with anhedral (drooping) wings, which are inherently unstable. They showed that a pilot can maintain control of lateral roll and it was a good way for a flying machine to turn—to "bank" or "lean" into the turn just like a bird or just like a person riding a bicycle. Equally important, this method would enable recovery when the wind tilted the machine to one side. Although used in 1903, it would not become widely known in Europe until August 1908, when Wilbur Wright demonstrated to European aviators the importance of the coordinated use of elevator, rudder and roll control for making effective turns.

== Vertical wing position ==
The vertical positioning of the wing changes the roll stability of an aircraft.

- An aircraft with a "high" wing position (i.e., set on top of the fuselage) has a higher roll stability. For example, the Cessna 152.
- An aircraft with a "low" wing (i.e., underneath the fuselage) has less roll stability. The Piper Pawnee uses a "low" wing.

== Unstable aircraft ==
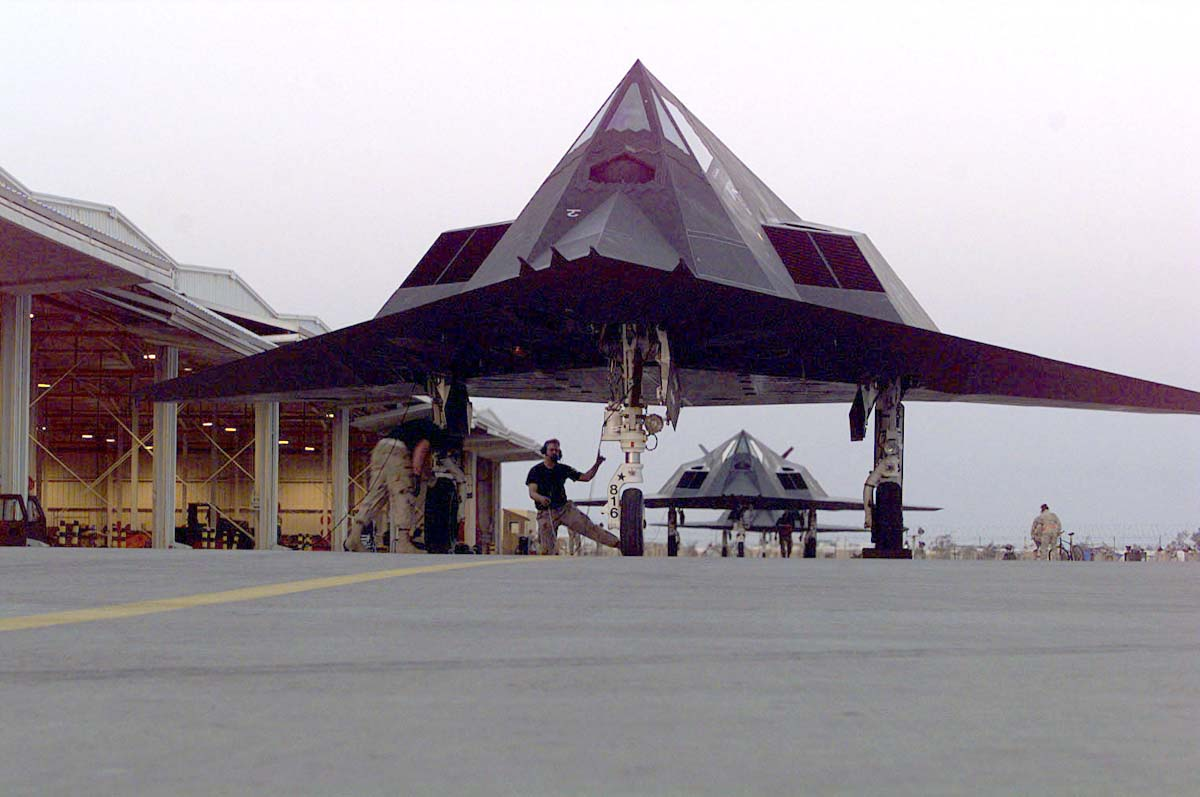
The Lockheed F-117 Nighthawk is not an inherently stable design.

Modern military aircraft, particularly low observable ("stealth") designs, often exhibit instability as a result of their shape. The Lockheed F-117 Nighthawk, for instance, employs a highly non-traditional fuselage and wing shape in order to reduce its radar cross section and enable it to penetrate air defenses with relative impunity. However, the flat facets of the design reduce its stability to the point where a computerized fly-by-wire system is required for it to fly.

Relaxed stability designs are not limited to military jets. The McDonnell Douglas MD-11 has a neutral stability design which was implemented to save fuel. To ensure stability for safe flight, an LSAS (Longitudinal Stability Augmentation System) was introduced to compensate for the MD-11's rather short horizontal stabilizer and ensure that the aircraft would remain stable. However, there have been incidents in which the MD-11's relaxed stability caused an "inflight upset".

== Intentional instability ==
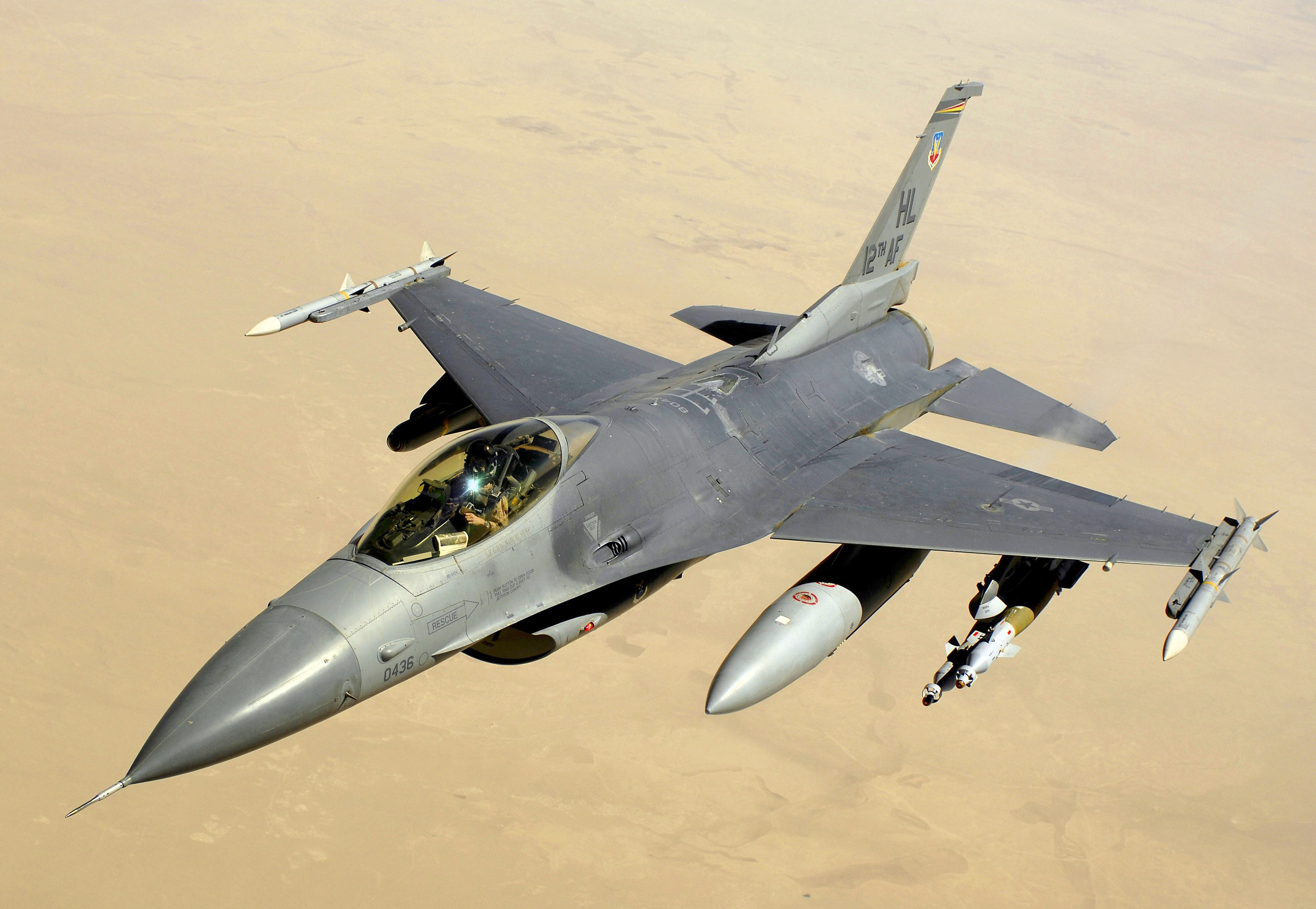
The F-16 Fighting Falcon is an intentionally unstable design.

Many modern fighter aircraft often employ design elements that reduce stability to increase maneuverability. Greater stability leads to lesser control surface authority; therefore, a less stable design will have a faster response to control inputs. This is highly sought after in fighter aircraft design.

A less stable aircraft requires smaller control deflections to initiate maneuvering; consequently, drag and control surface imposed stresses will be reduced and aircraft responsiveness will be enhanced. Since these characteristics will typically make control by the pilot difficult or impossible, artificial stability will typically be imposed using computers, servos, and sensors as parts of a fly-by-wire control system.

== See also ==
- Index of aviation articles
- Dual control (aviation)
- Trim drag

== General and cited references ==
- Crouch, Tom D (2003). The Bishop's Boys: A Life of Wilbur and Orville Wright. New York: WW Norton & Co. ISBN 978-0-393-30695-8.
- Tobin, James (2004). To Conquer The Air: The Wright Brothers and the Great Race for Flight. New York: Simon & Schuster. ISBN 978-0-7432-5536-3.
