= Trim drag =

Component of aerodynamic drag on aircraft

Trim drag is the component of aerodynamic drag on an aircraft created by the flight control surfaces, mainly elevators and trimable horizontal stabilizers, when they are used to offset changes in pitching moment and centre of gravity during flight. For longitudinal stability in pitch and in speed, aircraft are designed in such a way that the centre of mass (centre of gravity) is forward of the neutral point. The nose-down pitching moment is compensated by the downward aerodynamic force on the elevator and the trimable horizontal stabilizer. This downwards force on the tailplane (horizontal stabilizer and elevator combination) produces lift–induced drag in a similar way as the lift on the wing produces lift–induced drag. The changes (shifts) of the position of the centre of mass are often caused by fuel being burned off over the period of the flight, and require the aerodynamic trim force to be adjusted. Systems that actively pump fuel between separate fuel tanks in the aircraft can be used to offset this effect and reduce the trim drag.

Fly-By-Wire flight control systems can completely eliminate trim drag at transonic speeds, and reduce it substantially at supersonic speeds by using the tail as a lifting body, adding to wing lift, at subsonic speeds, transitioning to pushing down against the wing as in conventional designs at supersonic speeds, and just at Mach 1 going completely neutral, providing no lift whatsoever in either direction. This not only eliminates trim drag but also slightly reduces induced drag when crossing the sound barrier.
