= Aerodynamic force =

Force exerted on a body as it moves through air or gas

The aerodynamic force is the resultant vector from adding the lift vector, perpendicular to the flow direction, and the drag vector, parallel to the flow direction.

Forces on an aerofoil.

In fluid mechanics, an aerodynamic force is a force exerted on a body by the air (or other gas) in which the body is immersed, and is due to the relative motion between the body and the gas.

== Force ==
There are two causes of aerodynamic force:

- the normal force due to the pressure on the surface of the body
- the shear force due to the viscosity of the gas, also known as skin friction.

Pressure acts normal to the surface, and shear force acts parallel to the surface. Both forces act locally. The net aerodynamic force on the body is equal to the pressure and shear forces integrated over the body's total exposed area.

When an airfoil moves relative to the air, it generates an aerodynamic force determined by the velocity of relative motion, and the angle of attack. This aerodynamic force is commonly resolved into two components, both acting through the center of pressure:

- drag is the force component parallel to the direction of relative motion,
- lift is the force component perpendicular to the direction of relative motion.

In addition to these two forces, the body may experience an aerodynamic moment.

The force created by propellers and jet engines is called thrust, and is a reaction force.

The other force acting on an aircraft is its weight, which is a body force and not an aerodynamic force.

== See also ==
- Fluid dynamics
