= Weather helm =

Sailing term

Weather helm is the tendency of sailing vessels to turn towards the source of wind, creating an unbalanced helm that requires rudder control away from the wind in order to counteract the effect. For tiller-controlled craft, this requires pulling the tiller to windward – hence, 'to weather'.

Weather helm is the opposite of lee helm. It is generally less troublesome than lee helm.

== Overview ==
Weather helm is the result of a leeward and aft shift of a vessel's vector center of effort (the direction to which the force generated by the sails is pushing). This shift is caused by excess pressure on the mainsail, which overpowers the windward lateral resistance generated by the jib (or other head sail) and keel or centerboard. This results in an imbalance of force at the stern from windward, and the craft pivots about the center of drag (often near the center of the keel or centerboard), causing the bow to drive windward. Weather helm does not only result from an overpowered main; when a vessel is heeling to leeward, the aft component of keel drag is moved to windward. This creates a force (a turning moment) that pushes the bow to weather. As both an overpowered main and heavy heel occur in the same circumstances, it is sometimes difficult to determine the source of weather helm.

While weather helm occurs on any size of vessel, the physical movement of the craft is often more severe for vessels without a keel. This is a result of the smaller blade being very quickly overpowered by the relatively larger mainsail. In keelboats, despite the fact that weather helm is not as readily felt, it can be just as detrimental, as the lateral drag against the blade still exists, along with the need to pull the rudder to an undesirable position.

A slight amount of weather helm is thought by some sailors to be a desirable situation, both from the standpoint of the "feel" of the helm, and the tendency of the boat to head slightly to windward in stronger gusts, to some extent self-feathering the sails. Other sailors disagree and prefer a neutral helm. Weather helm also provides a form of dead man's switch – the boat stops safely in irons if the helm is released for a length of time.

== Mitigation ==
Any action that reduces the angle of heel of a boat that is reaching or beating to windward will help reduce weather helm. Racing sailors use their body weight to bring the boat to a more upright position. Reducing or reefing the total sail area will have the same effect and, counter-intuitively, many boats will sail faster with less sail in a stiff breeze once heel and weather helm have been reduced, due to the reduction in underwater drag (see Over-canvassed sailing). Easing the sheets on aft-most sails, such as the mainsail in a sloop or cutter can have an immediate effect, especially to help with maneuvering. Moving or increasing sail area forward can also help, for example by raising the jib (and maybe lowering the staysail) on a cutter.

Sailing off the wind, weather helm may be caused by the imbalance due to fore-and-aft sails all being sheeted out on the same (leeward) side of the boat. Raising a spinnaker or poling out a headsail to windward with a whisker pole can help. Yachts making ocean trade wind crossings have rigged 'twins' – double headsails poled out to opposite sides from the same forestay for extended downwind passages without a mainsail. Square rigged sails also provide relatively symmetric drive off the wind.

As weather helm requires pulling the rudder through the water at an angle to the intended course, it produces drag and impedes the boat's progress through the water. In the book "Sailing Illustrated", Patrick M. Royce defines weather helm as simply a "heeling sailboat wanting to come head to wind." The principle is the same whether the vessel is steered by tiller or wheel; turning the wheel leeward gives the same rudder effect as pulling a tiller windward.

== Discussion ==
The fundamental cause of "helm", be it weather or lee, is the differential between the center of effort of the sail plan to the center of lateral resistance of the hull. If the center of pressure is astern of the center of lateral resistance, a weather helm, the tendency of the vessel to want to turn into the wind, or to weather-vane, will result.

If the situation is reversed, with the center of pressure forward of the center of resistance of the hull, a "lee" helm will result, which is generally considered undesirable, if not dangerous. Too much of either helm is not good, since it forces the helmsman to hold the rudder deflected to counter it, thus inducing extra drag beyond what a vessel with neutral or minimal helm would experience.

A smaller side-effect of weather helm is to provide a hydrodynamic force from the rudder pushing the vessel windward against the water. A well-tuned racing sailboat can take advantage of this additional force in certain circumstances.
