= Flight dynamics =

Study of the performance, stability, and control of flying vehicles

Flight dynamics, in aviation and spacecraft, is the study of the performance, stability, and control of vehicles flying through the air or in outer space. It is concerned with how forces acting on the vehicle determine its velocity and attitude with respect to time.

In aircraft flight dynamics, for a fixed-wing aircraft, its changing orientation with respect to the local air flow is represented by two critical angles, the angle of attack of the wing ("alpha") and the angle of attack of the vertical tail, known as the sideslip angle ("beta"). A sideslip angle will arise if an aircraft yaws about its centre of gravity and if the aircraft sideslips bodily, i.e. the centre of gravity moves sideways. These angles are important because they are the principal sources of changes in the aerodynamic forces and moments applied to the aircraft.

Spacecraft flight dynamics involve three main forces: propulsive (rocket engine), gravitational, and atmospheric resistance. Propulsive force and atmospheric resistance have significantly less influence over a given spacecraft compared to gravitational forces.

== Aircraft ==
Axes to control the attitude of a plane

Flight dynamics is the science of air-vehicle orientation and control in three dimensions. The critical flight dynamics parameters are the angles of rotation with respect to the three aircraft's principal axes about its center of gravity, known as roll, pitch and yaw.

Aircraft engineers develop control systems for a vehicle's orientation (attitude) about its center of gravity. The control systems include actuators, which exert forces in various directions, and generate rotational forces or moments about the center of gravity of the aircraft, and thus rotate the aircraft in pitch, roll, or yaw. For example, a pitching moment is a vertical force applied at a distance forward or aft from the center of gravity of the aircraft, causing the aircraft to pitch up or down.

Roll, pitch and yaw refer, in this context, to rotations about the respective axes starting from a defined equilibrium state. The equilibrium roll angle is known as wings level or zero bank angle, equivalent to a level heeling angle on a ship. Yaw is known as "heading".

A fixed-wing aircraft increases or decreases the lift generated by the wings when it pitches nose up or down by increasing or decreasing the angle of attack (AOA). The roll angle is also known as bank angle on a fixed-wing aircraft, which usually "banks" to change the horizontal direction of flight. An aircraft is streamlined from nose to tail to reduce drag making it advantageous to keep the sideslip angle near zero, though aircraft are deliberately "side-slipped" when landing in a cross-wind, as explained in slip (aerodynamics).

== Spacecraft and satellites ==
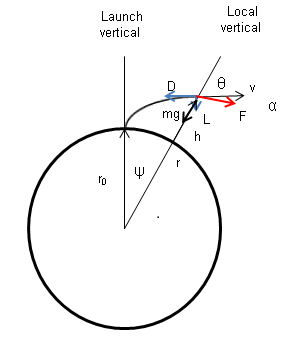
Propulsive, aerodynamic, and gravitational force vectors acting on a space vehicle during launch

The forces acting on space vehicles are of three types: propulsive force (usually provided by the vehicle's engine thrust); gravitational force exerted by the Earth and other celestial bodies; and aerodynamic lift and drag (when flying in the atmosphere of the Earth or another body, such as Mars or Venus). The vehicle's attitude must be controlled during powered atmospheric flight because of its effect on the aerodynamic and propulsive forces. There are other reasons, unrelated to flight dynamics, for controlling the vehicle's attitude in non-powered flight (e.g., thermal control, solar power generation, communications, or astronomical observation).

The flight dynamics of spacecraft differ from those of aircraft in that the aerodynamic forces are of very small, or vanishingly small effect for most of the vehicle's flight, and cannot be used for attitude control during that time. Also, most of a spacecraft's flight time is usually unpowered, leaving gravity as the dominant force.

== See also ==
- Aerodynamics – Branch of dynamics concerned with studying the motion of air
- Aircraft flight control system – How aircraft are controlled
- Fixed-wing aircraft – Heavier-than-air aircraft with fixed wings generating aerodynamic lift
- Flight control surfaces – Surface that allows a pilot to adjust and control an aircraft's flight attitude
- Flight dynamics (fixed-wing aircraft) – Science of air vehicle orientation and control in three dimensions
- List of aerospace engineering software
- Moving frame – Generalization of an ordered basis of a vector space
