= Lee helm =

Term in boating

There are two different meanings to the term lee helm depending on whether one is discussing sailboats or motorized ships.

== Sailboats ==
Lee helm is the tendency of a sailboat to turn away from the wind while under sail. It is the opposite of weather helm (the tendency of a sailboat to "round up" into the wind). A boat with lee helm will be difficult to sail close hauled, and tacking may be difficult.

== Description ==
Lee helm is considered dangerous in a sailboat. While sailing, an undirected boat with lee helm will bear (turn) away from the wind, accelerate, and perform an accidental or uncontrolled gybe, perhaps repeatedly. In an uncontrolled gybe, the force of the wind moves the sails and boom from one side of the boat to the other. In a strong wind, this movement will be very fast and forceful... and can damage the boat, the sails, injure the crew, or cause the boat to broach (lay over on its side).

The cause of lee helm is that the center of pressure exerted by the wind on the sails falls too far forward of the center of resistance of the hull — the natural point at which the hull tries to pivot. This tends to push the bow of the boat away from the wind. This can be due to a poor design, for example with the mast too far forward.

A small amount of lee helm can be counter-acted with the rudder, but this introduces significant drag in the water and slows the boat. A small amount of lee helm can also be cured by raking the mast backward (which moves the center of pressure aft), reducing the size of the jib on a sloop rigged boat, or increasing the size of the mizzen sail on a yawl or a ketch. Large amounts of lee helm can only be corrected by altering the placement of the mast(s) or keel/centerboard --- a non-trivial venture.

Ideally, a sailboat's sail plan should allow for a neutral helm, avoiding Weather Helm's tendency to round up too strongly (and perhaps place the boat 'in irons') or Lee Helm's tendency to make the boat fall off from the wind, possibly in an uncontrolled and dangerous jibe. How this balance is achieved will differ from sail plan to sail plan, depending on where the sails are carried relative to the center of effort of the hull.

== Lee helm on U.S. naval vessels ==
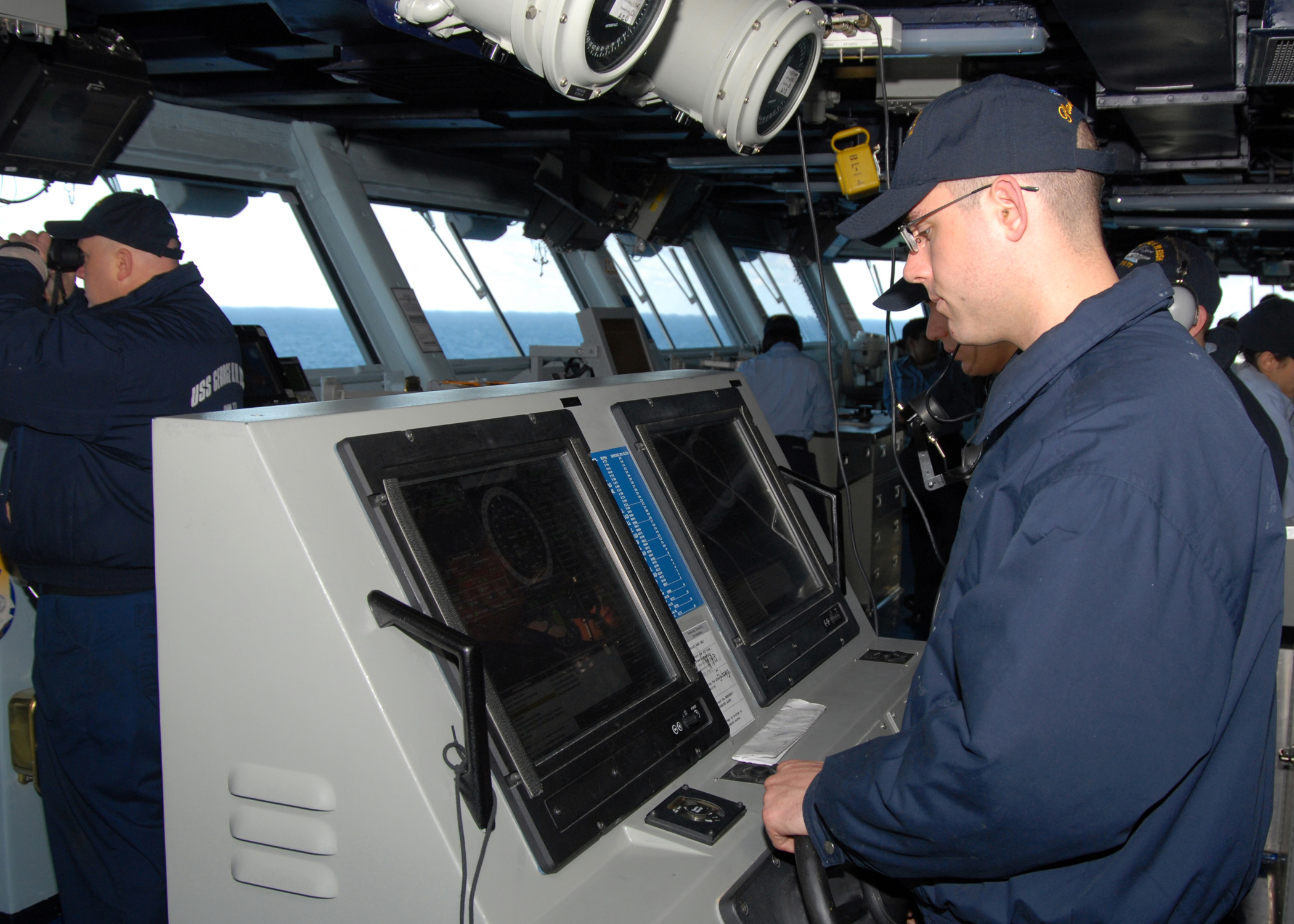
Sailors stand lee helm and helmsman watch.

Traditionally, two stations are on the bridge of a ship for controlling the vessel's maneuvers: the helm, which uses a wheel (or touchscreen equivalent) to send signals to control the position of the rudder or rudders, and the lee helm, which traditionally inputs speed commands by operating an engine order telegraph to send engine commands to the engineering personnel below decks. On modern US Navy surface vessels using gas turbine or diesel propulsion, the lee helm directly controls the ship's speed via throttle (either a manual throttle lever or a touch screen on some ships). The bridge throttle directly manipulates propeller pitch and/or engine RPM any time the bridge station is in control, or switches to a traditional order telegraph during those rare situations the bridge station relinquishes control or if the control system fails. The lee helm on vessels with nuclear propulsion (carriers and submarines) and conventional steam propulsion (amphibious assault ships prior to LHD-8) uses a telegraph. One origin for the lee helm designation for the engine order-telegraph—large sailing ships had a helmsman at the wheel, plus an auxiliary helmsman positioned on the leeward side of the helm – hence the term lee helm – to assist the helmsman in controlling the wheel while coming about or while the vessel is laboring in high winds or an extreme sea state.

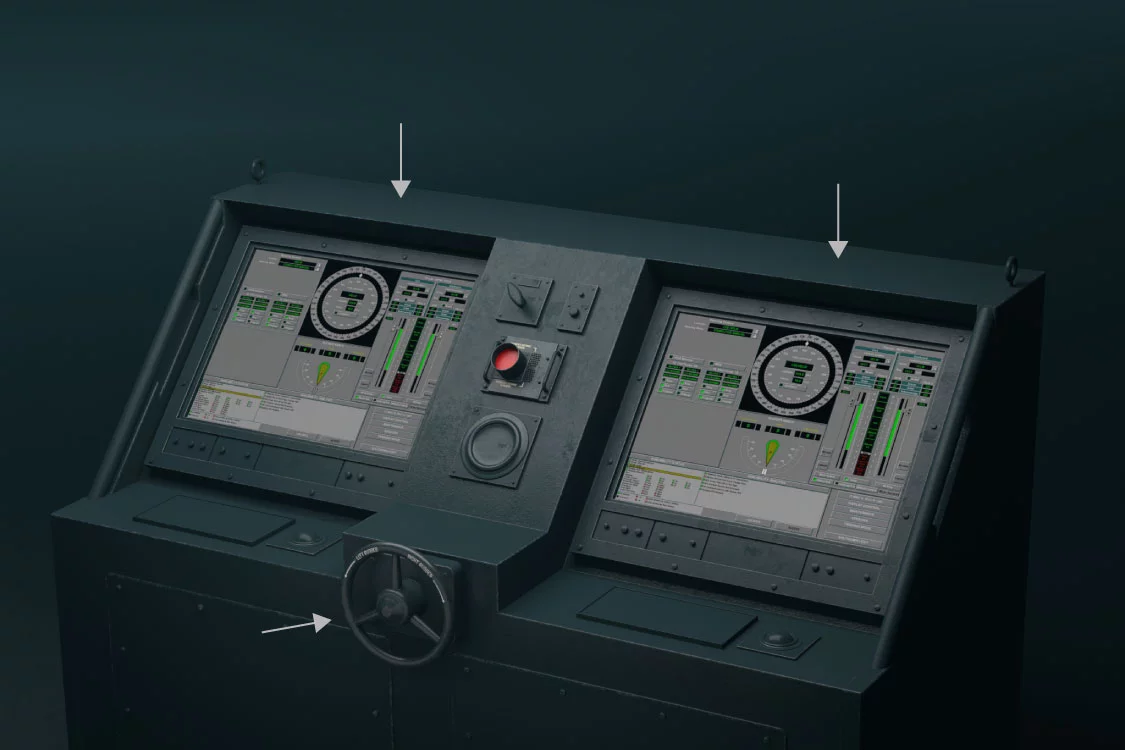
Modern Helm and Lee Helm with touchscreens and steering wheel used in the US Navy's Integrated Bridge and Navigation System (IBNS).

The US Navy's Integrated Bridge and Navigation System (IBNS) uses two touchscreens and steering wheel for steering. The helm is on the left, and the lee helm is on the right.
