= Clear-air turbulence =

Turbulent movement of transparent air masses

In meteorology, clear-air turbulence (CAT) is the turbulent movement of air masses in the absence of any visual clues such as clouds, and is caused when bodies of air moving at widely different speeds meet.

The atmospheric region most susceptible to CAT is the high troposphere at altitudes of around 7,000–12,000 m (23,000–39,000 ft) as it meets the tropopause. Here CAT is most frequently encountered in the regions of jet streams. At lower altitudes it may also occur near mountain ranges. Thin cirrus clouds can also indicate high probability of CAT.

CAT can be hazardous to the comfort, and occasionally the safety, of air travelers, as the aircraft pilots often cannot see and anticipate such turbulences, and a sudden encounter can impart significant stress to the airframe.

CAT in the jet stream is expected to become stronger and more frequent because of climate change, with transatlantic wintertime CAT increasing by 60% (light), 95% (moderate), and 150% (severe) by the time of CO_{2} doubling.

== Definition ==
In meteorology, clear-air turbulence (CAT) is the turbulent movement of air masses in the absence of any visual clues, such as clouds, and is caused when bodies of air moving at widely different speeds meet.

In aviation, CAT is defined as "the detection by aircraft of high-altitude inflight bumps in patchy regions devoid of significant cloudiness or nearby thunderstorm activity". It was first noted in the 1940s.

== Detection ==
Clear-air turbulence is not possible to detect with the naked eye and very difficult to detect with a conventional radar, with the result that it is difficult for aircraft pilots to detect and avoid it. However, it can be remotely detected with instruments that can measure turbulence with optical techniques, such as scintillometers, Doppler LIDARs, or N-slit interferometers.

== Factors ==
At typical heights where it occurs, the intensity and location cannot be determined precisely. However, because this turbulence affects long range aircraft that fly near the tropopause, CAT has been intensely studied. Several factors affect the likelihood of CAT. Often more than one factor is present.

As of 1965 it had been noted that 64% of the non-light turbulences (not only CAT) were observed less than 150 nautical miles (280 km) away from the core of a jet stream. A jet stream produces horizontal wind shear at its peripheries, caused by the different relative air speeds of the stream and the surrounding air. Wind shear, a difference in relative speed between two adjacent air masses, can produce vortices, and when of sufficient degree, the air will tend to move chaotically.

A strong anticyclone vortex can also lead to CAT.

Rossby waves caused by this jet stream shear and the Coriolis force cause it to meander.

Although the altitudes near the tropopause are usually cloudless, thin cirrus cloud can form where there are abrupt changes of air velocity, for example associated with jet streams. Lines of cirrus perpendicular to the jet stream indicate possible CAT, especially if the ends of the cirrus are dispersed, in which case the direction of dispersal can indicate if the CAT is stronger at the left or at the right of the jet stream.

A temperature gradient is the change of temperature over a distance in some given direction. Where the temperature of a gas changes, so does its density and where the density changes CAT can appear.

From the ground upwards through the troposphere temperature decreases with height; from the tropopause upwards through the stratosphere temperature increases with height. Such variations are examples of temperature gradients.

A horizontal temperature gradient may occur, and hence air density variations, where air velocity changes. An example: the speed of the jet stream is not constant along its length; additionally air temperature and hence density will vary between the air within the jet stream and the air outside.

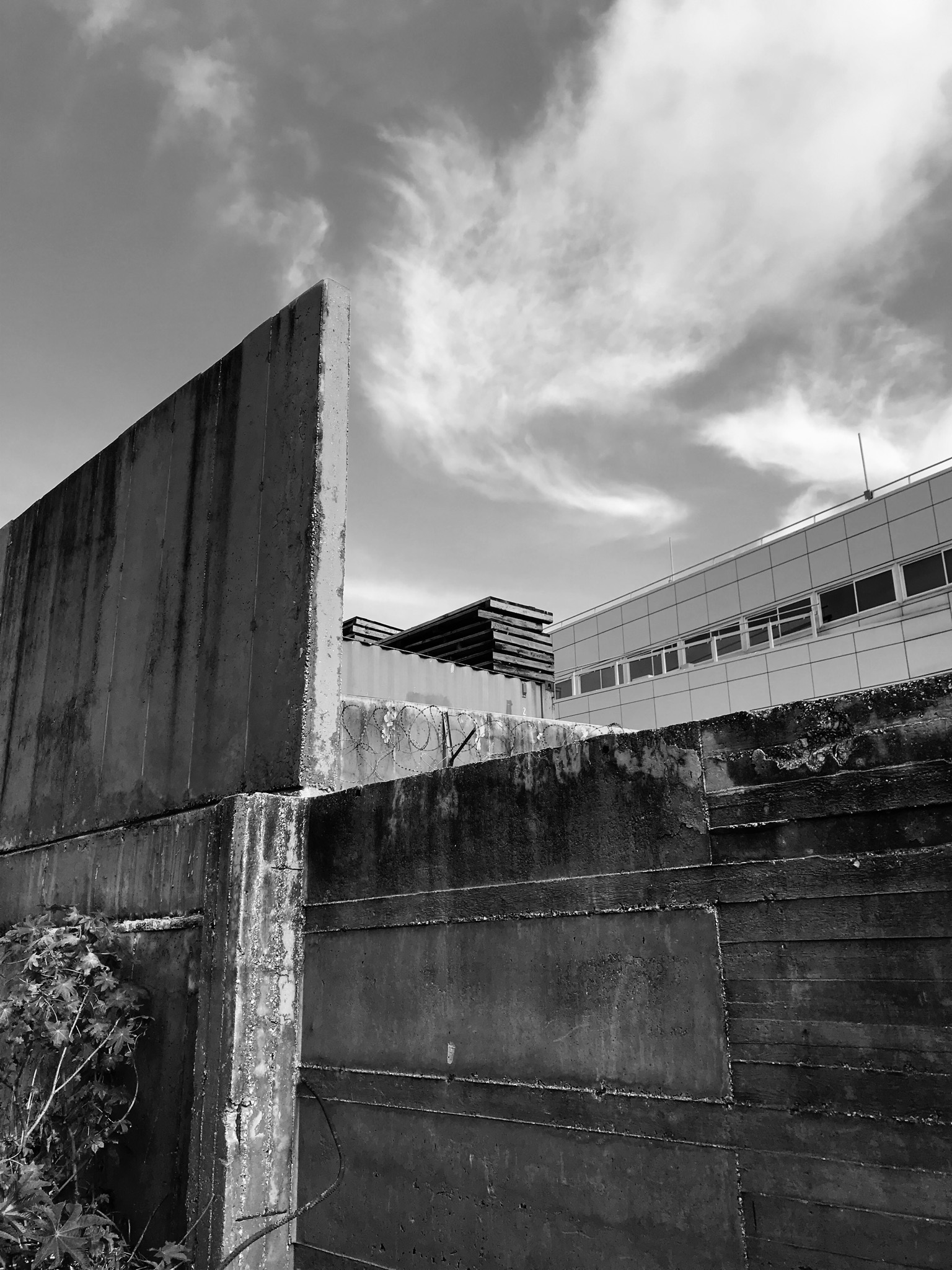
Cirrus clouds often associated with clear-air turbulence

As is explained elsewhere in this article, temperature decreases and wind velocity increase with height in the troposphere, and the reverse is true within the stratosphere. These differences cause changes in air density, and hence viscosity. The viscosity of the air thus presents both inertias and accelerations which cannot be determined in advance.

Vertical wind shear above the jet stream (i.e., in the stratosphere) is sharper when it is moving upwards, because wind speed decreases with height in the stratosphere. This is the reason CAT can be generated above the tropopause, despite the stratosphere otherwise being a region which is vertically stable. On the other hand, vertical wind shear moving downwards within the stratosphere is more moderate (i.e., because downwards wind shear within the stratosphere is effectively moving against the manner in which wind speed changes within the stratosphere) and CAT is never produced in the stratosphere. Similar considerations apply to the troposphere but in reverse.

When strong wind deviates, the change of wind direction implies a change in the wind speed. A stream of wind can change its direction by differences of pressure. CAT appears more frequently when the wind is surrounding a low pressure region, especially with sharp troughs that change the wind direction more than 100°. Extreme CAT has been reported without any other factor than this.

Wind flow over a mountain produces oscillations (A), (B) etc.

Mountain waves are formed when four requirements are met. When these factors coincide with jet streams, CAT can occur:

- A mountain range, not an isolated mountain
- Strong perpendicular wind
- Wind direction maintained with altitude
- Temperature inversion at the top of the mountain range

The tropopause is a layer which separates two very different types of air. Beneath it, the air gets colder and the wind gets faster with height. Above it, the air warms and wind velocity decreases with height. These changes in temperature and velocity can produce fluctuation in the altitude of the tropopause, called gravity waves.

== Effects on aircraft ==
=== Pilot rules ===
When a pilot experiences CAT, a number of rules should be applied:

- The aircraft must sustain the recommended velocity for turbulence.
- When following the jet stream to escape from the CAT, the aircraft must change altitude and/or heading.
- When the CAT arrives from one side of the airplane, the pilot must observe the thermometer to determine whether the aircraft is above or below the jet stream and then move away from the tropopause.
- When the CAT is associated with a sharp trough, the plane must go through the low-pressure region instead of around it.
- The pilot may issue a Pilot Report (PIREP), communicating position, altitude and severity of the turbulence to warn other aircraft entering the region.

=== Cases ===
Because aircraft move so quickly, they can experience sudden unexpected accelerations or 'bumps' from turbulence, including CAT – as the aircraft rapidly cross invisible bodies of air which are moving vertically at many different speeds. Although the vast majority of cases of turbulence are harmless, in rare cases cabin crew and passengers on aircraft have been injured when tossed around inside an aircraft cabin during extreme turbulence. In a small number of cases, people have been killed and at least two aircraft disintegrated mid-air.

- On July 19, 1961, Aerolíneas Argentinas Flight 644 from Buenos Aires to Comodoro Rivadavia, a Douglas DC-6, disintegrated mid-air after entering an area of severe CAT that caused stress exceeding the structural limitations of the aircraft. The failure started at the aircraft's wing.
- On March 5, 1966, BOAC Flight 911 from Tokyo to Hong Kong, a Boeing 707, broke up in CAT, with the loss of all persons (124) on board after experiencing severe lee-wave turbulence just downwind of Mount Fuji, Japan. The sequence of failure started with the vertical stabilizer getting ripped off.
- On December 28, 1997, on United Airlines Flight 826, one person died and 17 others were seriously injured in a CAT event.
- On May 21, 2024, one passenger died and dozens were injured on Singapore Airlines Flight 321 from London to Singapore, causing the plane to divert to Bangkok.

=== Cost ===
Turbulence can impose considerable financial burdens on the aviation industry. According to AVTECH, a company that develops in-flight optimization services for airlines, annual turbulence-related costs for individual airlines can range from $250,000 to $2 million. These expenses may include aircraft inspections and maintenance following turbulence encounters, costs associated with flight diversions or delays, and passenger compensation.

In addition to direct costs, turbulence-related operational disruptions contribute to increased fuel consumption and greenhouse gas emissions. Eurocontrol reported that in 2019, adverse weather conditions forced airlines to fly an additional one million kilometres, generating approximately 19,000 extra tonnes of CO₂ emissions. As climate change is expected to increase the frequency and intensity of both clear-air and storm-related turbulence, these costs are projected to rise further, with implications for airline efficiency, airspace congestion, and environmental impact.

== See also ==
- Continuous gusts
- Dryden Wind Turbulence Model
- Ellrod index
- N-slit interferometer
- von Kármán Wind Turbulence Model
- Wake turbulence
