= Continuous gusts =

Winds that vary randomly in space and time

Continuous gusts or stochastic gusts are winds that vary randomly in space and time. Models of continuous gusts are used to represent atmospheric turbulence, especially clear air turbulence and turbulent winds in storms. The Federal Aviation Administration (FAA) and the United States Department of Defense provide requirements for the models of continuous gusts used in design and simulation of aircraft.

== Models of continuous gusts ==
A variety of models exist for gusts but only two, the Dryden and von Kármán models, are generally used for continuous gusts in flight dynamics applications. Both of these models define gusts in terms of power spectral densities for the linear and angular velocity components parameterized by turbulence length scales and intensities. The velocity components of these continuous gust models can be incorporated into airplane equations of motion as a wind disturbance. While these models of continuous gusts are not white noise, filters can be designed that take a white noise input and output a random process with the Dryden or von Kármán models.

== Assumptions of continuous gust models ==
The models accepted by the FAA and Department of Defense represent continuous gusts as a wind linear and angular velocity field that is a random process and make a number of simplifying assumptions in order to describe them mathematically. In particular, continuous gusts are assumed to be:

- A Gaussian process
- A stationary process, so the statistics are constant in time
- Homogeneous, so the statistics do not depend on the vehicle path
- Ergodic
- Isotropic at high altitude, so the statistics do not depend on the vehicle attitude
- Varying in space but frozen in time

These assumptions, while unrealistic, yield acceptable models for flight dynamics applications. The last assumption of a velocity field that does not vary with time is especially unrealistic, since measurements of atmospheric turbulence at one point in space always vary with time. These models rely on the airplane's motion through the gusts to generate temporal variations in wind velocity, making them inappropriate for use as inputs to models of hovering, wind turbines, or other applications that are fixed in space.

The models also make assumptions about how continuous gusts vary with altitude. The Dryden and von Kármán models specified by the Department of Defense define three different altitude ranges: low, 10 ft to 1000 ft AGL; medium/high, 2000 ft AGL and above; and in between. The turbulence intensities, turbulence scale lengths, and turbulence axes depend on the altitude. The Department of Defense also provides models for the gust angular velocity but gives criteria based on airplane stability derivatives for when they can be omitted.

== Dryden model ==
The Dryden model is one of the most commonly used models of continuous gusts. It was first published in 1952. The power spectral density of the longitudinal linear velocity component is

$\Phi_{u_g}(\Omega)=\sigma_u^2\frac{2 L_u}{\pi} \frac{1}{1+ (L_u \Omega)^2}$

where u_{g} is the gusts' longitudinal linear velocity component, σ_{u} is the turbulence intensity, L_{u} is the turbulence scale length, and Ω is a spatial frequency.

The Dryden model has rational power spectral densities for each velocity component. This means that an exact filter can be formed that takes white noise as an input and outputs a random process with the Dryden model's power spectral densities.

== von Kármán model ==
The von Kármán model is the preferred model of continuous gusts for the Department of Defense and the FAA. The model first appeared in a 1957 NACA report based on earlier work by Theodore von Kármán. In this model, the power spectral density of the longitudinal linear velocity component is

$\Phi_{u_g}(\Omega)=\sigma_u^2\frac{2 L_u}{\pi} \frac{1}{ \left(1+ (1.339 L_u \Omega)^2 \right)^\frac{5}{6}}$

where u_{g} is the longitudinal linear velocity component, σ_{u} is the turbulence intensity, L_{u} is the turbulence scale length, and Ω is a spatial frequency.

The von Kármán model has irrational power spectral densities. So, a filter with a white noise input that outputs a random process with the von Kármán model's power spectral densities can only be approximated.

== Altitude dependence ==
Both the Dryden and von Kármán models are parameterized by a length scale and turbulence intensity. The combination of these two parameters determine the shape of the power spectral densities and therefore the quality of the models' fit to spectra of observed turbulence. Many combinations of length scale and turbulence intensity give realistic power spectral densities in the desired frequency ranges. The Department of Defense specifications include choices for both parameters, including their dependence on altitude, which are summarized below.

=== Low altitude ===
Low altitude is defined as altitudes between 10 ft AGL and 1000 ft AGL.

==== Length scales ====
At low altitude, the scale lengths are functions of altitude,

$2L_w = h$

$L_u=2L_v=\frac{h}{(0.177+0.000823h)^{1.2}}$

where h is the altitude AGL. At 1000 ft AGL, L_{u} = 2L_{v} = 2L_{w} = 1000 ft.

==== Turbulence intensities ====
At low altitude, the turbulence intensities are parameterized by W_{20}, the wind speed at 20 ft.

Turbulence severity	$W_{20}$
Light	15 kts
Moderate	30 kts
Severe	45 kts

$\sigma_w=0.1W_{20}$

$\frac{\sigma_u}{\sigma_w}=\frac{\sigma_v}{\sigma_w}=\frac{1}{(0.177+0.000823h)^{0.4}}$

At 1000 ft AGL,

$\sigma_u=\sigma_v=\sigma_w=0.1W_{20}$

=== Medium/high altitude ===
Medium/high altitude is defined as 2000 ft AGL and above.

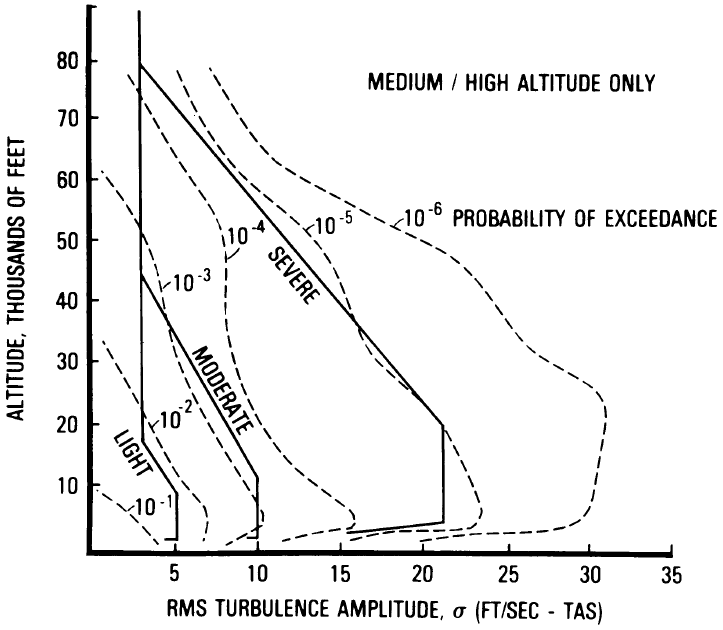
Turbulence intensity vs. altitude for medium/high altitudes.

==== Length scales ====
For the Dryden model,

$L_u=2L_v=2L_w=1750 \text{ft}$

For the von Kármán model,

$L_u=2L_v=2L_w=2500 \text{ft}$

==== Turbulence intensities ====
At high altitude,

$\sigma_u=\sigma_v=\sigma_w$

They are parameterized by the probability of exceedance or the turbulence severity. A plot of turbulence intensity versus altitude showing lines of constant probability of exceedance and ranges corresponding to different turbulence severities is provided in the military specifications.

=== Between low and medium/high altitude ===
From 1000 ft AGL to 2000 ft AGL, both the length scale and turbulence intensity are determined by linear interpolation between the low altitude value at 1000 ft and the medium/high altitude value at 2000 ft.

=== Turbulence axes ===
Above 1750 ft, the axes of the turbulence coincide with the wind frame axes. Below 1750 ft, the vertical turbulence axis is aligned with the Earth frame z-axis, the longitudinal turbulence axis is aligned with the projection of the mean wind vector onto the Earth frame's horizontal plane, and the lateral turbulence axis is determined by the right hand rule.

== See also ==
- Clear air turbulence
- Dryden Wind Turbulence Model
- Von Kármán wind turbulence model
