= Aircraft flight dynamics =

Science of air vehicle orientation and control in three dimensions

The three axes of rotation in an aircraft

Aircraft flight dynamics is the science of air vehicle orientation and control in three dimensions. The three critical flight dynamics parameters are the angles of rotation in three dimensions about the vehicle's center of gravity (cg), known as pitch, roll and yaw; these are collectively known as aircraft attitude, often principally relative to the atmospheric frame in normal flight, but also relative to terrain during takeoff or landing, or when operating at low elevation. The concept of attitude is not specific to fixed-wing aircraft, but also extends to rotary aircraft such as helicopters, and dirigibles, where the flight dynamics involved in establishing and controlling attitude are entirely different.

Control systems adjust the orientation of a vehicle about its cg. A control system includes control surfaces which, when deflected, generate a moment (or couple from ailerons) about the cg which rotates the aircraft in pitch, roll, and yaw. For example, a pitching moment comes from a force applied at a distance forward or aft of the cg, causing the aircraft to pitch up or down.

A fixed-wing aircraft increases or decreases the lift generated by the wings when it pitches nose up or down by increasing or decreasing the angle of attack (AOA). The roll angle is also known as bank angle on a fixed-wing aircraft, which usually "banks" to change the horizontal direction of flight. An aircraft is streamlined from nose to tail to reduce drag making it advantageous to keep the sideslip angle near zero, though an aircraft may be deliberately "sideslipped" to increase drag and descent rate during landing, to keep aircraft heading same as runway heading during cross-wind landings and during flight with asymmetric power.

== Background ==
Roll, pitch and yaw refer to rotations about the respective axes starting from a defined steady flight equilibrium state. The equilibrium roll angle is known as wings level or zero bank angle.

The most common aeronautical convention defines roll as acting about the longitudinal axis, positive with the starboard (right) wing down. Yaw is about the vertical body axis, positive with the nose to starboard. Pitch is about an axis perpendicular to the longitudinal plane of symmetry, positive nose up.

yaw

pitch

roll

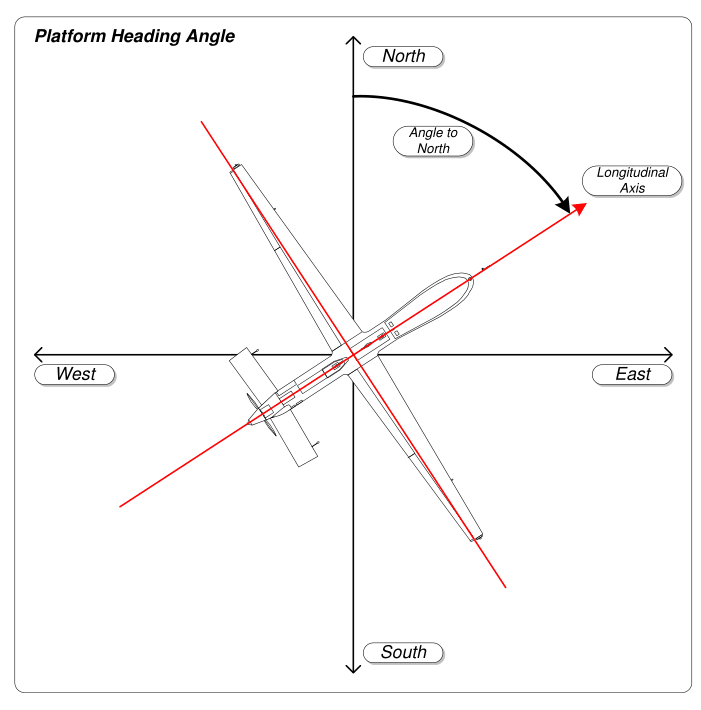
Yaw or heading angle definition

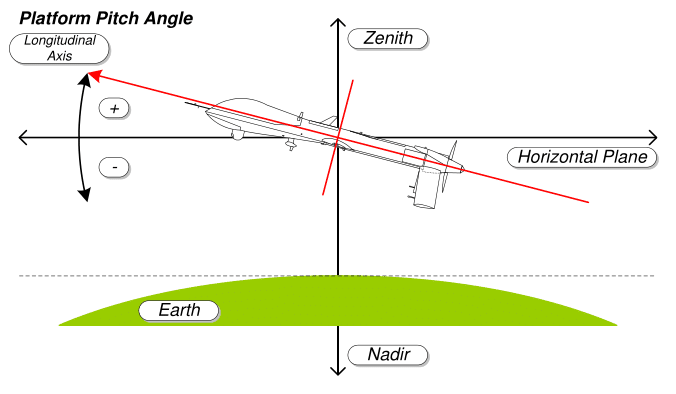
Pitch angle definition

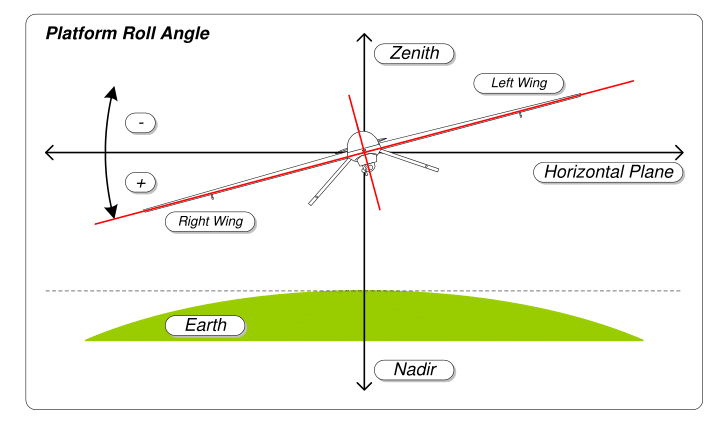
Roll angle definition

=== Reference frames ===
Three right-handed, Cartesian coordinate systems see frequent use in flight dynamics. The first coordinate system has an origin fixed in the reference frame of the Earth:

- Earth frame
  - Origin – arbitrary, fixed relative to the surface of the Earth
  - x_{E} axis – positive in the direction of north
  - y_{E} axis – positive in the direction of east
  - z_{E} axis – positive towards the center of the Earth

In many flight dynamics applications, the Earth frame is assumed to be inertial with a flat x_{E},y_{E}-plane, though the Earth frame can also be considered a spherical coordinate system with origin at the center of the Earth.

The other two reference frames are body-fixed, with origins moving along with the aircraft, typically at the center of gravity. For an aircraft that is symmetric from right-to-left, the frames can be defined as:

- Body frame
  - Origin - airplane center of gravity
  - x_{b} axis – positive out the nose of the aircraft in the plane of symmetry of the aircraft
  - z_{b} axis – perpendicular to the x_{b} axis, in the plane of symmetry of the aircraft, positive below the aircraft
  - y_{b} axis – perpendicular to the x_{b},z_{b}-plane, positive determined by the right-hand rule (generally, positive out the right wing)
- Wind frame
  - Origin – airplane center of gravity
  - x_{w} axis – positive in the direction of the velocity vector of the aircraft relative to the air
  - z_{w} axis – perpendicular to the x_{w} axis, in the plane of symmetry of the aircraft, positive below the aircraft
  - y_{w} axis – perpendicular to the x_{w},z_{w}-plane, positive determined by the right hand rule (generally, positive to the right)

Asymmetric aircraft have analogous body-fixed frames, but different conventions must be used to choose the precise directions of the x and z axes.

The Earth frame is a convenient frame to express aircraft translational and rotational kinematics. The Earth frame is also useful in that, under certain assumptions, it can be approximated as inertial. Additionally, one force acting on the aircraft, weight, is fixed in the +z_{E} direction.

The body frame is often of interest because the origin and the axes remain fixed relative to the aircraft. This means that the relative orientation of the Earth and body frames describes the aircraft attitude. Also, the direction of the force of thrust is generally fixed in the body frame, though some aircraft can vary this direction, for example by thrust vectoring.

The wind frame is a convenient frame to express the aerodynamic forces and moments acting on an aircraft. In particular, the net aerodynamic force can be divided into components along the wind frame axes, with the drag force in the −x_{w} direction and the lift force in the −z_{w} direction.

Mnemonics to remember angle names

In addition to defining the reference frames, the relative orientation of the reference frames can be determined. The relative orientation can be expressed in a variety of forms, including:

- Rotation matrices
- Direction cosines
- Euler angles
- Quaternions

The various Euler angles relating the three reference frames are important to flight dynamics. Many Euler angle conventions exist, but all of the rotation sequences presented below use the z-y'-x" convention. This convention corresponds to a type of Tait-Bryan angles, which are commonly referred to as Euler angles. This convention is described in detail below for the roll, pitch, and yaw Euler angles that describe the body frame orientation relative to the Earth frame. The other sets of Euler angles are described below by analogy.

=== Transformations (Euler angles) ===
==== From Earth frame to body frame ====
- First, rotate the Earth frame axes x_{E} and y_{E} around the z_{E} axis by the yaw angle ψ. This results in an intermediate reference frame with axes denoted x',y',z', where z'=z_{E}.
- Second, rotate the x' and z' axes around the y' axis by the pitch angle θ. This results in another intermediate reference frame with axes denoted x",y",z", where y"=y'.
- Finally, rotate the y" and z" axes around the x" axis by the roll angle φ. The reference frame that results after the three rotations is the body frame.

Based on the rotations and axes conventions above:

- Yaw angle ψ: angle between north and the projection of the aircraft longitudinal axis onto the horizontal plane;
- Pitch angle θ: angle between the aircraft longitudinal axis and horizontal;
- Roll angle φ: rotation around the aircraft longitudinal axis after rotating by yaw and pitch.

==== From Earth frame to wind frame ====
- Heading angle σ: angle between north and the horizontal component of the velocity vector, which describes which direction the aircraft is moving relative to cardinal directions.
- Flight path angle γ: is the angle between horizontal and the velocity vector, which describes whether the aircraft is climbing or descending.
- Bank angle μ: represents a rotation of the lift force around the velocity vector, which may indicate whether the airplane is turning.

When performing the rotations described above to obtain the body frame from the Earth frame, there is this analogy between angles:

- σ, ψ (heading vs yaw)
- γ, θ (Flight path vs pitch)
- μ, φ (Bank vs Roll)

==== From wind frame to body frame ====
- Sideslip angle β: angle between the velocity vector and the projection of the aircraft longitudinal axis onto the x_{w},y_{w}-plane, which describes whether there is a lateral component to the aircraft velocity
- Angle of attack α: angle between the x_{w},y_{w}-plane and the aircraft longitudinal axis and, among other things, is an important variable in determining the magnitude of the force of lift

When performing the rotations described earlier to obtain the body frame from the Earth frame, there is this analogy between angles:

- β, ψ (sideslip vs yaw)
- α, θ (attack vs pitch)
- (φ = 0) (nothing vs roll)

=== Analogies ===
Between the three reference frames there are hence these analogies:

- Yaw / Heading / Sideslip (Z axis, vertical)
- Pitch / Flight path / Attack angle (Y axis, wing)
- Roll / Bank / nothing (X axis, nose)

== Design cases ==
In analyzing the stability of an aircraft, it is usual to consider perturbations about a nominal steady flight state. So the analysis would be applied, for example, assuming:

Straight and level flight
Turn at constant speed
Approach and landing
Takeoff

The speed, height and trim angle of attack are different for each flight condition, in addition, the aircraft will be configured differently, e.g. at low speed flaps may be deployed and the undercarriage may be down.

Except for asymmetric designs (or symmetric designs at significant sideslip), the longitudinal equations of motion (involving pitch and lift forces) may be treated independently of the lateral motion (involving roll and yaw).

The following considers perturbations about a nominal straight and level flight path.

To keep the analysis (relatively) simple, the control surfaces are assumed fixed throughout the motion, this is stick-fixed stability. Stick-free analysis requires the further complication of taking the motion of the control surfaces into account.

Furthermore, the flight is assumed to take place in still air, and the aircraft is treated as a rigid body.

== Forces of flight ==
Three forces act on an aircraft in flight: weight, thrust, and the aerodynamic force.

=== Aerodynamic force ===
==== Components of the aerodynamic force ====
The expression to calculate the aerodynamic force is:

$$\mathbf{F}_A = \int_\Sigma (-\Delta p \mathbf{n} + \mathbf{f}) \,d\sigma$$

where:

$\Delta p \equiv$ Difference between static pressure and free current pressure
$\mathbf{n} \equiv$ outer normal vector of the element of area
$\mathbf{f} \equiv$ tangential stress vector practised by the air on the body
$\Sigma \equiv$ adequate reference surface

projected on wind axes we obtain:

$$\mathbf{F}_A = -(\mathbf{i}_w D + \mathbf{j}_w Q + \mathbf{k}_w L)$$

where:

$D \equiv$ Drag
$Q \equiv$ Lateral force
$L \equiv$ Lift

==== Aerodynamic coefficients ====
- Dynamic pressure of the free current $\equiv q = \tfrac12\, \rho\, V^{2}$

Proper reference surface (wing surface, in case of planes) $\equiv S$

- Pressure coefficient $\equiv C_p = \dfrac{p-p_\infty}{q}$
- Friction coefficient $\equiv C_f = \dfrac{f}{q}$
- Drag coefficient $\equiv C_d = \dfrac{D}{qS} = - \dfrac{1}{S} \int_\Sigma [ (-C_p) \mathbf{n} \cdot \mathbf{i_w} + C_f \mathbf{t} \cdot \mathbf{i_w}] \,d\sigma$
- Lateral force coefficient $\equiv C_Q = \dfrac{Q}{qS} = - \dfrac{1}{S} \int_\Sigma [ (-C_p) \mathbf{n} \cdot \mathbf{j_w} + C_f \mathbf{t} \cdot \mathbf{j_w}] \,d\sigma$
- Lift coefficient $\equiv C_L = \dfrac{L}{qS} = - \dfrac{1}{S} \int_\Sigma [ (-C_p) \mathbf{n} \cdot \mathbf{k_w} + C_f \mathbf{t} \cdot \mathbf{k_w}] \,d\sigma$

It is necessary to know C_{p} and C_{f} in every point on the considered surface.

==== Dimensionless parameters and aerodynamic regimes ====
In absence of thermal effects, there are three remarkable dimensionless numbers:

- Compressibility of the flow:

Mach number $\equiv M = \dfrac{V}{a}$

- Viscosity of the flow:

Reynolds number $\equiv Re = \dfrac{\rho V l}{\mu}$

- Rarefaction of the flow:

Knudsen number $\equiv Kn = \dfrac{\lambda}{l}$

where:

$a = \sqrt{k R \theta} \equiv$ speed of sound

$k\equiv$ specific heat ratio
$R\equiv$ gas constant by mass unity
$\theta \equiv$ absolute temperature

$\lambda = \dfrac{\mu}{\rho} \sqrt{\dfrac{\pi}{2 R \theta}} = \dfrac{M}{Re} \sqrt{\dfrac{k \pi}{2}} \equiv$ mean free path

According to λ there are three possible rarefaction grades and their corresponding motions are called:

- Continuum current (negligible rarefaction): $\dfrac{M}{Re} \ll 1$
- Transition current (moderate rarefaction): $\dfrac{M}{Re} \approx 1$
- Free molecular current (high rarefaction): $\dfrac{M}{Re} \gg 1$

The motion of a body through a flow is considered, in flight dynamics, as continuum current. In the outer layer of the space that surrounds the body viscosity will be negligible. However viscosity effects will have to be considered when analysing the flow in the nearness of the boundary layer.

Depending on the compressibility of the flow, different kinds of currents can be considered:

- Incompressible subsonic current: $0 < M < 0.3$
- Compressible subsonic current: $0.3 < M < 0.8$
- Transonic current: $0.8 < M < 1.2$
- Supersonic current: $1.2 < M < 5$
- Hypersonic current: $5 < M$

==== Drag coefficient equation and aerodynamic efficiency ====
If the geometry of the body is fixed and in case of symmetric flight (β=0 and Q=0), pressure and friction coefficients are functions depending on:

$$C_p = C_p ( \alpha , M , Re , P)$$
$$C_f = C_f ( \alpha , M , Re , P)$$

where:

$\alpha \equiv$ angle of attack
$P \equiv$ considered point of the surface

Under these conditions, drag and lift coefficient are functions depending exclusively on the angle of attack of the body and Mach and Reynolds numbers. Aerodynamic efficiency, defined as the relation between lift and drag coefficients, will depend on those parameters as well.

$$\begin{cases}
C_D = C_D ( \alpha , M , Re) \\
C_L = C_L ( \alpha , M , Re) \\
E = E ( \alpha , M , Re) = \dfrac{C_L}{C_D} \\
\end{cases}$$

It is also possible to get the dependency of the drag coefficient respect to the lift coefficient. This relation is known as the drag coefficient equation:

$C_D = C_D ( C_L , M , Re ) \equiv$ drag coefficient equation

The aerodynamic efficiency has a maximum value, E_{max}, respect to C_{L} where the tangent line from the coordinate origin touches the drag coefficient equation plot.

The drag coefficient, C_{D}, can be decomposed in two ways. First typical decomposition separates pressure and friction effects:

$$C_D = C_{Df} + C_{Dp} \begin{cases} C_{Df} = \dfrac{D}{qS} = - \dfrac{1}{S} \int_\Sigma C_f \mathbf{t} \bullet \mathbf{i_w} \,d\sigma \\ C_{Dp} = \dfrac{D}{qS} = - \dfrac{1}{S} \int_\Sigma (-C_p) \mathbf{n} \bullet \mathbf{i_w} \,d\sigma \end{cases}$$

There is a second typical decomposition taking into account the definition of the drag coefficient equation. This decomposition separates the effect of the lift coefficient in the equation, obtaining two terms C_{D0} and C_{Di}. C_{D0} is known as the parasitic drag coefficient and it is the base drag coefficient at zero lift. C_{Di} is known as the induced drag coefficient and it is produced by the body lift.

$$C_D = C_{D0} + C_{Di} \begin{cases} C_{D0} = (C_D)_{C_L = 0} \\ C_{Di} \end{cases}$$

==== Parabolic and generic drag coefficient ====
A good attempt for the induced drag coefficient is to assume a parabolic dependency of the lift

$$C_{Di} = k C_L^2 \Rightarrow C_D = C_{D0} + k C_L^2$$

Aerodynamic efficiency is now calculated as:

$$E = \dfrac{C_L}{C_{D0} + k C_L^2} \Rightarrow \begin{cases} E_{max} = \dfrac{1}{2 \sqrt{k C_{D0}}} \\ (C_L)_{Emax} = \sqrt{ \dfrac{C_{D0}}{k} } \\ (C_{Di})_{Emax} = C_{D0} \end{cases}$$

If the configuration of the plane is symmetrical respect to the XY plane, minimum drag coefficient equals to the parasitic drag of the plane.

$$C_{Dmin} = (C_D)_{CL=0} = C_{D0}$$

In case the configuration is asymmetrical respect to the XY plane, however, minimum drag differs from the parasitic drag. On these cases, a new approximate parabolic drag equation can be traced leaving the minimum drag value at zero lift value.

$$C_{Dmin} = C_{DM} \neq (C_D)_{CL=0}$$

$$C_D = C_{DM} + k (C_L - C_{LM})^2$$

==== Variation of parameters with the Mach number ====
The Coefficient of pressure varies with Mach number by the relation given below:

$$C_{p} = \frac {C_{p0}} {\sqrt {|1-{M_{\infty}}^2|}}$$

where

- C_{p} is the compressible pressure coefficient
- C_{p0} is the incompressible pressure coefficient
- M_{∞} is the freestream Mach number.

This relation is reasonably accurate for 0.3 < M < 0.7 and when M = 1 it becomes ∞ which is impossible physical situation and is called Prandtl–Glauert singularity.

==== Aerodynamic force in a specified atmosphere ====
See Aerodynamic force.

== Stability ==
Stability is the ability of the aircraft to counteract disturbances to its flight path.

According to David P. Davies, there are six types of aircraft stability: speed stability, stick free static longitudinal stability, static lateral stability, directional stability, oscillatory stability, and spiral stability.

=== Speed stability ===
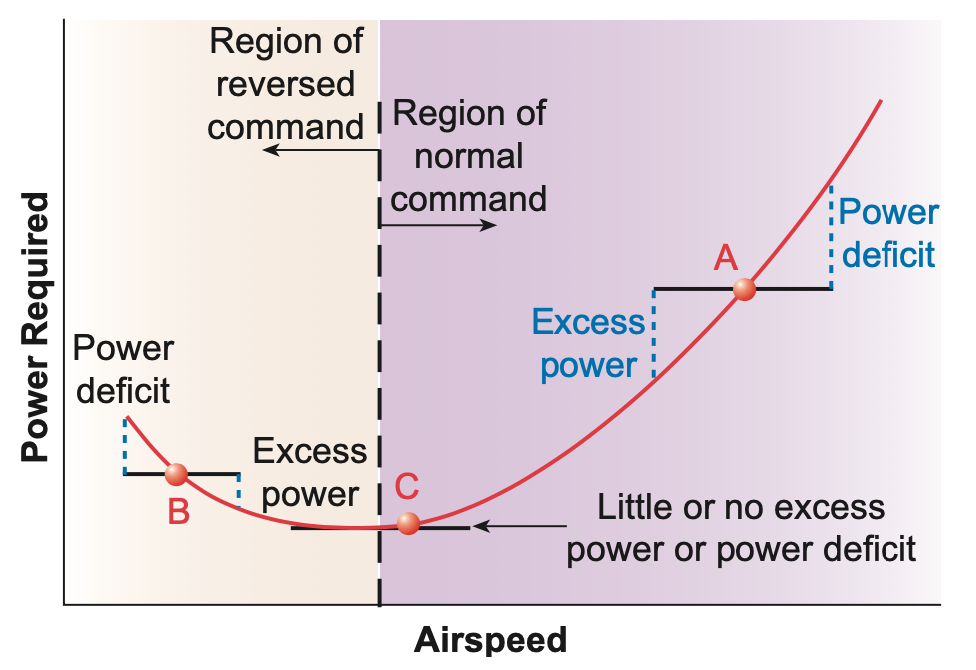
When power setting is kept the same but airspeed fluctuates, aircraft tends to return to its original airspeed at point A, magnify the speed change at point B, and remain at its new speed at point C.

An aircraft in cruise flight is typically speed stable. If speed increases, drag increases, which will reduce the speed back to equilibrium for its configuration and thrust setting. If speed decreases, drag decreases, and the aircraft will accelerate back to its equilibrium speed where thrust equals drag.

However, in slow flight, due to lift-induced drag, as speed decreases, drag increases (and vice versa). This is known as the "back of the drag curve". The aircraft will be speed unstable, because a decrease in speed will cause a further decrease in speed.

=== Static stability and control ===
==== Longitudinal static stability ====
Longitudinal stability refers to the stability of an aircraft in pitch. For a stable aircraft, if the aircraft pitches up, the wings and tail create a pitch-down moment which tends to restore the aircraft to its original attitude. For an unstable aircraft, a disturbance in pitch will lead to an increasing pitching moment. Longitudinal static stability is the ability of an aircraft to recover from an initial disturbance. Longitudinal dynamic stability refers to the damping of these stabilizing moments, which prevents persistent or increasing oscillations in pitch.

==== Directional stability ====
Directional or weathercock stability is concerned with the static stability of the airplane about the z axis. Just as in the case of longitudinal stability it is desirable that the aircraft should tend to return to an equilibrium condition when subjected to some form of yawing disturbance. For this the slope of the yawing moment curve must be positive. An airplane possessing this mode of stability will always point towards the relative wind, hence the name weathercock stability.

=== Dynamic stability and control ===
==== Longitudinal modes ====
It is common practice to derive a fourth order characteristic equation to describe the longitudinal motion, and then factorize it approximately into a high frequency mode and a low frequency mode. The approach adopted here is using qualitative knowledge of aircraft behavior to simplify the equations from the outset, reaching the result by a more accessible route.

The two longitudinal motions (modes) are called the short period pitch oscillation (SPPO), and the phugoid.

===== Short-period pitch oscillation =====
A short input (in control systems terminology an impulse) in pitch (generally via the elevator in a standard configuration fixed-wing aircraft) will generally lead to overshoots about the trimmed condition. The transition is characterized by a damped simple harmonic motion about the new trim. There is very little change in the trajectory over the time it takes for the oscillation to damp out.

Generally this oscillation is high frequency (hence short period) and is damped over a period of a few seconds. A real-world example would involve a pilot selecting a new climb attitude, for example 5° nose up from the original attitude. A short, sharp pull back on the control column may be used, and will generally lead to oscillations about the new trim condition. If the oscillations are poorly damped the aircraft will take a long period of time to settle at the new condition, potentially leading to Pilot-induced oscillation. If the short period mode is unstable it will generally be impossible for the pilot to safely control the aircraft for any period of time.

This damped harmonic motion is called the short period pitch oscillation; it arises from the tendency of a stable aircraft to point in the general direction of flight. It is very similar in nature to the weathercock mode of missile or rocket configurations. The motion involves mainly the pitch attitude $\theta$ (theta) and incidence $\alpha$ (alpha). The direction of the velocity vector, relative to inertial axes is $\theta-\alpha$. The velocity vector is:

$$u_f=U\cos(\theta-\alpha)$$
$$w_f=U\sin(\theta-\alpha)$$

where $u_f$,$w_f$ are the inertial axes components of velocity. According to Newton's second law, the accelerations are proportional to the forces, so the forces in inertial axes are:

$$X_f=m\frac{du_f}{dt}=m\frac{dU}{dt}\cos(\theta-\alpha)-mU\frac{d(\theta-\alpha)}{dt}\sin(\theta-\alpha)$$
$$Z_f=m\frac{dw_f}{dt}=m\frac{dU}{dt}\sin(\theta-\alpha)+mU\frac{d(\theta-\alpha)}{dt}\cos(\theta-\alpha)$$

where m is the mass. By the nature of the motion, the speed variation $m\frac{dU}{dt}$ is negligible over the period of the oscillation, so:

$$X_f= -mU\frac{d(\theta-\alpha)}{dt}\sin(\theta-\alpha)$$
$$Z_f=mU\frac{d(\theta-\alpha)}{dt}\cos(\theta-\alpha)$$

But the forces are generated by the pressure distribution on the body, and are referred to the velocity vector. But the velocity (wind) axes set is not an inertial frame so we must resolve the fixed axes forces into wind axes. Also, we are only concerned with the force along the z-axis:

$$Z=-Z_f\cos(\theta-\alpha)+X_f\sin(\theta-\alpha)$$

Or:

$$Z=-mU\frac{d(\theta-\alpha)}{dt}$$

In words, the wind axes force is equal to the centripetal acceleration.

The moment equation is the time derivative of the angular momentum:

$$M=B\frac{d^2 \theta}{dt^2}$$

where M is the pitching moment, and B is the moment of inertia about the pitch axis. Let: $\frac{d\theta}{dt}=q$, the pitch rate. The equations of motion, with all forces and moments referred to wind axes are, therefore:

$$\frac{d\alpha}{dt}=q+\frac{Z}{mU}$$
$$\frac{dq}{dt}=\frac{M}{B}$$

We are only concerned with perturbations in forces and moments, due to perturbations in the states $\alpha$ and q, and their time derivatives. These are characterized by stability derivatives determined from the flight condition. The possible stability derivatives are:

$Z_\alpha$ Lift due to incidence, this is negative because the z-axis is downwards whilst positive incidence causes an upwards force.

$Z_q$ Lift due to pitch rate, arises from the increase in tail incidence, hence is also negative, but small compared with $Z_\alpha$.

$M_\alpha$ Pitching moment due to incidence - the static stability term. Static stability requires this to be negative.

$M_q$ Pitching moment due to pitch rate - the pitch damping term, this is always negative.

Since the tail is operating in the flowfield of the wing, changes in the wing incidence cause changes in the downwash, but there is a delay for the change in wing flowfield to affect the tail lift, this is represented as a moment proportional to the rate of change of incidence:

$$M_\dot\alpha$$

The delayed downwash effect gives the tail more lift and produces a nose down moment, so $M_\dot\alpha$ is expected to be negative.

The equations of motion, with small perturbation forces and moments become:

$$\frac{d\alpha}{dt}=\left(1+\frac{Z_q}{mU}\right)q+\frac{Z_\alpha}{mU}\alpha$$

$$\frac{dq}{dt}=\frac{M_q}{B}q+\frac{M_\alpha}{B}\alpha+\frac{M_\dot\alpha}{B}\dot\alpha$$

These may be manipulated to yield as second order linear differential equation in $\alpha$:

$$\frac{d^2\alpha}{dt^2}-\left(\frac{Z_\alpha}{mU}+\frac{M_q}{B}+(1+\frac{Z_q}{mU})\frac{M_\dot\alpha}{B}\right)\frac{d\alpha}{dt}+\left(\frac{Z_\alpha}{mU}\frac{M_q}{B}-\frac{M_\alpha}{B}(1+\frac{Z_q}{mU})\right)\alpha=0$$

This represents a damped simple harmonic motion.

We should expect $\frac{Z_q}{mU}$ to be small compared with unity, so the coefficient of $\alpha$ (the 'stiffness' term) will be positive, provided $M_\alpha<\frac{Z_\alpha}{mU}M_q$. This expression is dominated by $M_\alpha$, which defines the longitudinal static stability of the aircraft, it must be negative for stability. The damping term is reduced by the downwash effect, and it is difficult to design an aircraft with both rapid natural response and heavy damping. Usually, the response is underdamped but stable.

===== Phugoid =====
If the stick is held fixed, the aircraft will not maintain straight and level flight (except in the unlikely case that it happens to be perfectly trimmed for level flight at its current altitude and thrust setting), but will start to dive, level out and climb again. It will repeat this cycle until the pilot intervenes. This long period oscillation in speed and height is called the phugoid mode. This is analyzed by assuming that the SSPO performs its proper function and maintains the angle of attack near its nominal value. The two states which are mainly affected are the flight path angle $\gamma$ (gamma) and speed. The small perturbation equations of motion are:

$$mU\frac{d\gamma}{dt}=-Z$$

which means the centripetal force is equal to the perturbation in lift force.

For the speed, resolving along the trajectory:

$$m\frac{du}{dt}=X-mg\gamma$$

where g is the acceleration due to gravity at the Earth's surface. The acceleration along the trajectory is equal to the net x-wise force minus the component of weight. We should not expect significant aerodynamic derivatives to depend on the flight path angle, so only $X_u$ and $Z_u$ need be considered. $X_u$ is the drag increment with increased speed, it is negative, likewise $Z_u$ is the lift increment due to speed increment, it is also negative because lift acts in the opposite sense to the z-axis.

The equations of motion become:

$$mU\frac{d\gamma}{dt}=-Z_u u$$
$$m\frac{du}{dt}=X_u u -mg\gamma$$

These may be expressed as a second order equation in flight path angle or speed perturbation:

$$\frac{d^2u}{dt^2}-\frac{X_u}{m}\frac{du}{dt}-\frac{Z_ug}{mU}u=0$$

Now lift is very nearly equal to weight:

$$Z=\frac{1}{2}\rho U^2 c_L S_w=W$$

where $\rho$ is the air density, $S_w$ is the wing area, W the weight and $c_L$ is the lift coefficient (assumed constant because the incidence is constant), we have, approximately:

$$Z_u=\frac{2W}{U}=\frac{2mg}{U}$$

The period of the phugoid, T, is obtained from the coefficient of u:

$$\frac{2\pi}{T}=\sqrt{\frac{2g^2}{U^2}}$$

Or:

$$T=\frac{2\pi U}{\sqrt{2}g}$$

Since the lift is very much greater than the drag, the phugoid is at best lightly damped. A propeller with fixed speed would help. Heavy damping of the pitch rotation or a large rotational inertia increase the coupling between short period and phugoid modes, so that these will modify the phugoid.

==== Lateral modes ====
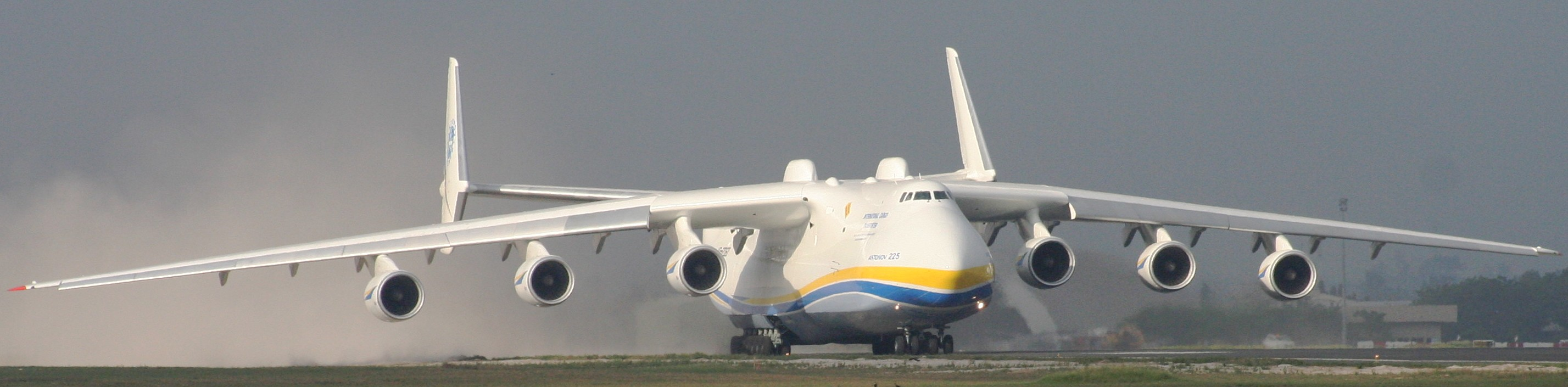
The Antonov An-225 had anhedral wings, which make it less stable but more manoeuvrable.

With a symmetrical rocket or missile, the directional stability in yaw is the same as the pitch stability; it resembles the short period pitch oscillation, with yaw plane equivalents to the pitch plane stability derivatives. For this reason, pitch and yaw directional stability are collectively known as the "weathercock" stability of the missile.

Aircraft lack the symmetry between pitch and yaw, so that directional stability in yaw is derived from a different set of stability derivatives. The yaw plane equivalent to the short period pitch oscillation, which describes yaw plane directional stability is called Dutch roll. Unlike pitch plane motions, the lateral modes involve both roll and yaw motion.

===== Dutch roll =====
It is customary to derive the equations of motion by formal manipulation in what, to the engineer, amounts to a piece of mathematical sleight of hand. The current approach follows the pitch plane analysis in formulating the equations in terms of concepts which are reasonably familiar.

Applying an impulse via the rudder pedals should induce Dutch roll, which is the oscillation in roll and yaw, with the roll motion lagging yaw by a quarter cycle, so that the wing tips follow elliptical paths with respect to the aircraft.

The yaw plane translational equation, as in the pitch plane, equates the centripetal acceleration to the side force.

$$\frac{d\beta}{dt}=\frac{Y}{mU}-r$$

where $\beta$ (beta) is the sideslip angle, Y the side force and r the yaw rate.

The moment equations are a bit trickier. The trim condition is with the aircraft at an angle of attack with respect to the airflow. The body x-axis does not align with the velocity vector, which is the reference direction for wind axes. In other words, wind axes are not principal axes (the mass is not distributed symmetrically about the yaw and roll axes). Consider the motion of an element of mass in position -z, x in the direction of the y-axis, i.e. into the plane of the paper.

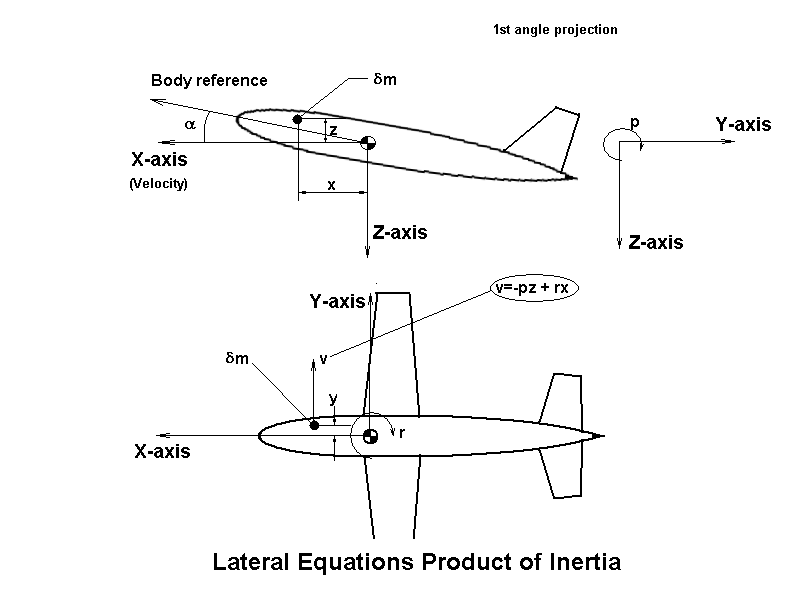

If the roll rate is p, the velocity of the particle is:

$$v=-pz+xr$$

Made up of two terms, the force on this particle is first the proportional to rate of v change, the second is due to the change in direction of this component of velocity as the body moves. The latter terms gives rise to cross products of small quantities (pq, pr, qr), which are later discarded. In this analysis, they are discarded from the outset for the sake of clarity. In effect, we assume that the direction of the velocity of the particle due to the simultaneous roll and yaw rates does not change significantly throughout the motion. With this simplifying assumption, the acceleration of the particle becomes:

$$\frac{dv}{dt}=-\frac{dp}{dt}z+\frac{dr}{dt}x$$

The yawing moment is given by:

$$\delta m x \frac{dv}{dt}=-\frac{dp}{dt}xz\delta m + \frac{dr}{dt}x^2\delta m$$

There is an additional yawing moment due to the offset of the particle in the y direction:$\frac{dr}{dt}y^2\delta m$

The yawing moment is found by summing over all particles of the body:

$$N=-\frac{dp}{dt}\int xz dm +\frac{dr}{dt}\int x^2 + y^2 dm =-E\frac{dp}{dt}+C\frac{dr}{dt}$$

where N is the yawing moment, E is a product of inertia, and C is the moment of inertia about the yaw axis. A similar reasoning yields the roll equation:

$$L=A\frac{dp}{dt}-E\frac{dr}{dt}$$

where L is the rolling moment and A the roll moment of inertia.

===== Lateral and longitudinal stability derivatives =====
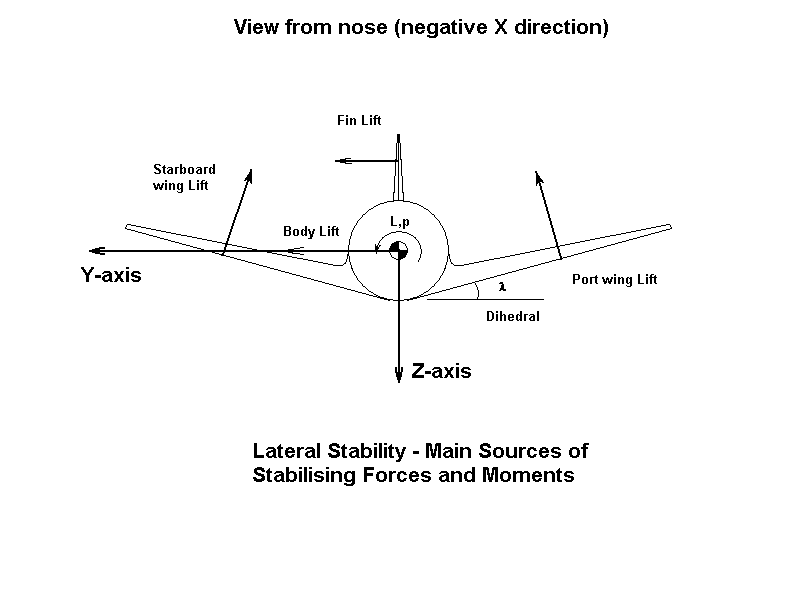
The states are $\beta$ (sideslip), r (yaw rate) and p (roll rate), with moments N (yaw) and L (roll), and force Y (sideways). There are nine stability derivatives relevant to this motion, the following explains how they originate. However a better intuitive understanding is to be gained by simply playing with a model airplane, and considering how the forces on each component are affected by changes in sideslip and angular velocity:

$Y_\beta$ Side force due to side slip (in absence of yaw).

Sideslip generates a sideforce from the fin and the fuselage. In addition, if the wing has dihedral, side slip at a positive roll angle increases incidence on the starboard wing and reduces it on the port side, resulting in a net force component directly opposite to the sideslip direction. Sweep back of the wings has the same effect on incidence, but since the wings are not inclined in the vertical plane, backsweep alone does not affect $Y_\beta$. However, anhedral may be used with high backsweep angles in high performance aircraft to offset the wing incidence effects of sideslip. Oddly enough this does not reverse the sign of the wing configuration's contribution to $Y_\beta$ (compared to the dihedral case).

$Y_p$ Side force due to roll rate.

Roll rate causes incidence at the fin, which generates a corresponding side force. Also, positive roll (starboard wing down) increases the lift on the starboard wing and reduces it on the port. If the wing has dihedral, this will result in a side force momentarily opposing the resultant sideslip tendency. Anhedral wing and or stabilizer configurations can cause the sign of the side force to invert if the fin effect is swamped.

$Y_r$ Side force due to yaw rate.

Yawing generates side forces due to incidence at the rudder, fin and fuselage.

$N_\beta$ Yawing moment due to sideslip forces.

Sideslip in the absence of rudder input causes incidence on the fuselage and empennage, thus creating a yawing moment counteracted only by the directional stiffness which would tend to point the aircraft's nose back into the wind in horizontal flight conditions. Under sideslip conditions at a given roll angle $N_\beta$ will tend to point the nose into the sideslip direction even without rudder input, causing a downward spiraling flight.

$N_p$ Yawing moment due to roll rate.

Roll rate generates fin lift causing a yawing moment and also differentially alters the lift on the wings, thus affecting the induced drag contribution of each wing, causing a (small) yawing moment contribution. Positive roll generally causes positive $N_p$ values unless the empennage is anhedral or fin is below the roll axis. Lateral force components resulting from dihedral or anhedral wing lift differences has little effect on $N_p$ because the wing axis is normally closely aligned with the center of gravity.

$N_r$ Yawing moment due to yaw rate.

Yaw rate input at any roll angle generates rudder, fin and fuselage force vectors which dominate the resultant yawing moment. Yawing also increases the speed of the outboard wing whilst slowing down the inboard wing, with corresponding changes in drag causing a (small) opposing yaw moment. $N_r$ opposes the inherent directional stiffness which tends to point the aircraft's nose back into the wind and always matches the sign of the yaw rate input.

$L_\beta$ Rolling moment due to sideslip.

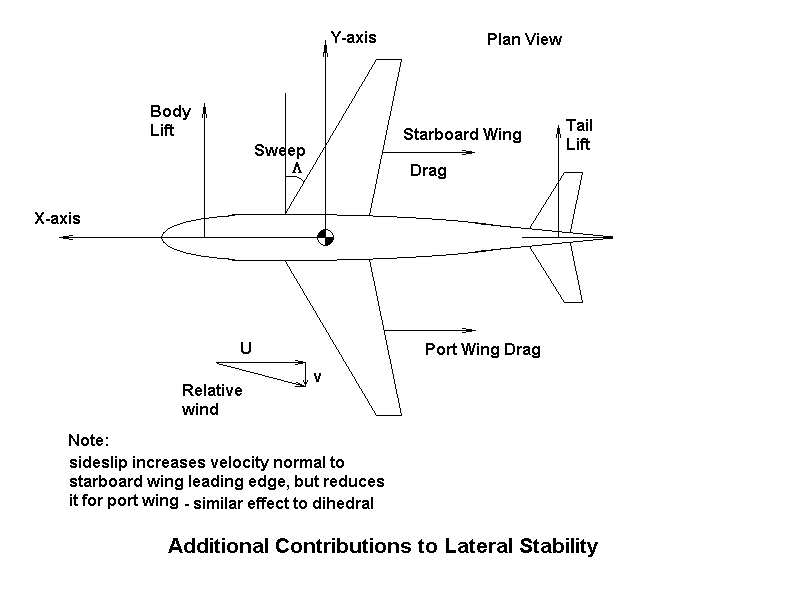
A positive sideslip angle generates empennage incidence which can cause positive or negative roll moment depending on its configuration. For any non-zero sideslip angle dihedral wings causes a rolling moment which tends to return the aircraft to the horizontal, as does back swept wings. With highly swept wings the resultant rolling moment may be excessive for all stability requirements and anhedral could be used to offset the effect of wing sweep induced rolling moment.

$L_r$ Rolling moment due to yaw rate.

Yaw increases the speed of the outboard wing whilst reducing speed of the inboard one, causing a rolling moment to the inboard side. The contribution of the fin normally supports this inward rolling effect unless offset by anhedral stabilizer above the roll axis (or dihedral below the roll axis).

$L_p$ Rolling moment due to roll rate.

Roll creates counter rotational forces on both starboard and port wings whilst also generating such forces at the empennage. These opposing rolling moment effects have to be overcome by the aileron input in order to sustain the roll rate. If the roll is stopped at a non-zero roll angle the $L_\beta$ upward rolling moment induced by the ensuing sideslip should return the aircraft to the horizontal unless exceeded in turn by the downward $L_r$ rolling moment resulting from sideslip induced yaw rate. Longitudinal stability could be ensured or improved by minimizing the latter effect.

===== Equations of motion =====
Since Dutch roll is a handling mode, analogous to the short period pitch oscillation, any effect it might have on the trajectory may be ignored. The body rate r is made up of the rate of change of sideslip angle and the rate of turn. Taking the latter as zero, assuming no effect on the trajectory, for the limited purpose of studying the Dutch roll:

$$\frac{d\beta}{dt}= -r$$

The yaw and roll equations, with the stability derivatives become:

$C\frac{dr}{dt}-E\frac{dp}{dt}=N_\beta \beta - N_r \frac{d\beta}{dt} + N_p p$ (yaw)

$A\frac{dp}{dt}-E\frac{dr}{dt}=L_\beta \beta - L_r \frac{d\beta}{dt} + L_p p$ (roll)

The inertial moment due to the roll acceleration is considered small compared with the aerodynamic terms, so the equations become:

$$-C\frac{d^2\beta}{dt^2} = N_\beta \beta - N_r \frac{d\beta}{dt} + N_p p$$
$$E\frac{d^2\beta}{dt^2} = L_\beta \beta - L_r \frac{d\beta}{dt} + L_p p$$

This becomes a second order equation governing either roll rate or sideslip:

$$\left(\frac{N_p}{C}\frac{E}{A}-\frac{L_p}{A}\right)\frac{d^2\beta}{dt^2}+
\left(\frac{L_p}{A}\frac{N_r}{C}-\frac{N_p}{C}\frac{L_r}{A}\right)\frac{d\beta}{dt}-
\left(\frac{L_p}{A}\frac{N_\beta}{C}-\frac{L_\beta}{A}\frac{N_p}{C}\right)\beta = 0$$

The equation for roll rate is identical. But the roll angle, $\phi$ (phi) is given by:

$$\frac{d\phi}{dt}=p$$

If p is a damped simple harmonic motion, so is $\phi$, but the roll must be in quadrature with the roll rate, and hence also with the sideslip. The motion consists of oscillations in roll and yaw, with the roll motion lagging 90 degrees behind the yaw. The wing tips trace out elliptical paths.

Stability requires the "stiffness" and "damping" terms to be positive. These are:

$\frac{\frac{L_p}{A}\frac{N_r}{C}-\frac{N_p}{C}\frac{L_r}{A}} {\frac{N_p}{C}\frac{E}{A}-\frac{L_p}{A}}$ (damping)

$\frac{\frac{L_\beta}{A}\frac{N_p}{C}-\frac{L_p}{A}\frac{N_\beta}{C}} {\frac{N_p}{C}\frac{E}{A}-\frac{L_p}{A}}$ (stiffness)

The denominator is dominated by $L_p$, the roll damping derivative, which is always negative, so the denominators of these two expressions will be positive.

Considering the "stiffness" term: $-L_p N_\beta$ will be positive because $L_p$ is always negative and $N_\beta$ is positive by design. $L_\beta$ is usually negative, whilst $N_p$ is positive. Excessive dihedral can destabilize the Dutch roll, so configurations with highly swept wings require anhedral to offset the wing sweep contribution to $L_\beta$.

The damping term is dominated by the product of the roll damping and the yaw damping derivatives, these are both negative, so their product is positive. The Dutch roll should therefore be damped.

The motion is accompanied by slight lateral motion of the center of gravity and a more "exact" analysis will introduce terms in $Y_\beta$ etc. In view of the accuracy with which stability derivatives can be calculated, this is an unnecessary pedantry, which serves to obscure the relationship between aircraft geometry and handling, which is the fundamental objective of this article.

===== Roll subsidence =====
Jerking the stick sideways and returning it to center causes a net change in roll orientation.

The roll motion is characterized by an absence of natural stability, there are no stability derivatives which generate moments in response to the inertial roll angle. A roll disturbance induces a roll rate which is only canceled by pilot or autopilot intervention. This takes place with insignificant changes in sideslip or yaw rate, so the equation of motion reduces to:

$$A\frac{dp}{dt}=L_p p.$$

$L_p$ is negative, so the roll rate will decay with time. The roll rate reduces to zero, but there is no direct control over the roll angle.

===== Spiral mode =====
Simply holding the stick still, when starting with the wings near level, an aircraft will usually have a tendency to gradually veer off to one side of the straight flightpath. This is the (slightly unstable) spiral mode.

====== Spiral mode trajectory ======
In studying the trajectory, it is the direction of the velocity vector, rather than that of the body, which is of interest. The direction of the velocity vector when projected on to the horizontal will be called the track, denoted $\mu$ (mu). The body orientation is called the heading, denoted $\psi$ (psi). The force equation of motion includes a component of weight:

$$\frac{d\mu}{dt}=\frac{Y}{mU} + \frac{g}{U}\phi$$

where g is the gravitational acceleration, and U is the speed.

Including the stability derivatives:

$$\frac{d\mu}{dt}=\frac{Y_\beta}{mU}\beta + \frac {Y_r}{mU}r + \frac{Y_p}{mU}p + \frac{g}{U}\phi$$

Roll rates and yaw rates are expected to be small, so the contributions of $Y_r$ and $Y_p$ will be ignored.

The sideslip and roll rate vary gradually, so their time derivatives are ignored. The yaw and roll equations reduce to:

$N_\beta \beta + N_r\frac{d\mu}{dt} + N_p p = 0$ (yaw)

$L_\beta \beta + L_r\frac{d\mu}{dt} + L_p p = 0$ (roll)

Solving for $\beta$ and p:

$$\beta=\frac{(L_r N_p - L_p N_r)}{(L_p N_\beta - N_p L_\beta)}\frac{d\mu}{dt}$$

$$p=\frac{(L_\beta N_r - L_r N_\beta)}{(L_p N_\beta - N_p L_\beta)}\frac{d\mu}{dt}$$

Substituting for sideslip and roll rate in the force equation results in a first order equation in roll angle:

$$\frac{d\phi}{dt}=mg\frac{(L_\beta N_r - N_\beta L_r)}{mU(L_p N_\beta - N_p L_\beta)-Y_\beta(L_r N_p - L_p N_r)}\phi$$

This is an exponential growth or decay, depending on whether the coefficient of $\phi$ is positive or negative. The denominator is usually negative, which requires $L_\beta N_r > N_\beta L_r$ (both products are positive). This is in direct conflict with the Dutch roll stability requirement, and it is difficult to design an aircraft for which both the Dutch roll and spiral mode are inherently stable.

Since the spiral mode has a long time constant, the pilot can intervene to effectively stabilize it, but an aircraft with an unstable Dutch roll would be difficult to fly. It is usual to design the aircraft with a stable Dutch roll mode, but slightly unstable spiral mode.

== See also ==
- Acronyms and abbreviations in avionics
- Aeronautics
- Attitude and heading reference system
- Steady flight
- Aircraft flight control system
- Aircraft flight mechanics
- Aircraft heading
- Aircraft bank
- Crosswind landing
- Dynamic positioning
- Flight control surfaces
- Helicopter dynamics
- JSBSim (An open source flight dynamics software model)
- Longitudinal static stability
- Rigid body dynamics
- Rotation matrix
- Ship motions
- Stability derivatives
- Static margin
- Weathervane effect
- 1902 Wright Glider
