= Steady flight =

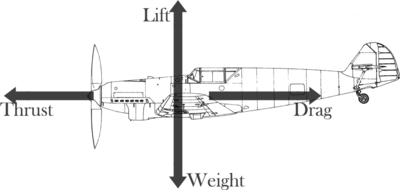
Forces acting on an airplane in steady level longitudinal flight, also known as straight and level flight, with a very small angle of attack. In steady level longitudinal flight, thrust counterbalances drag and lift supports the aircraft's weight. Lift and drag are components of the aerodynamic force.

Steady flight, unaccelerated flight, or equilibrium flight is a special case in flight dynamics where the aircraft's linear and angular velocity are constant in a body-fixed reference frame. Basic aircraft maneuvers such as level flight, climbs and descents, and coordinated turns can be modeled as steady flight maneuvers. Typical aircraft flight consists of a series of steady flight maneuvers connected by brief, accelerated transitions. Because of this, primary applications of steady flight models include aircraft design, assessment of aircraft performance, flight planning, and using steady flight states as the equilibrium conditions around which flight dynamics equations are expanded.

== Reference frames ==
Steady flight analysis uses three different reference frames to express the forces and moments acting on the aircraft. They are defined as:

- Earth frame (assumed inertial)
  - Origin - arbitrary, fixed relative to the surface of the Earth
  - x_{E} axis - positive in the direction of north
  - y_{E} axis - positive in the direction of east
  - z_{E} axis - positive towards the center of the Earth
- Body frame
  - Origin - airplane center of gravity
  - x_{b} (longitudinal) axis - positive out the nose of the aircraft in the plane of symmetry of the aircraft
  - z_{b} (vertical) axis - perpendicular to the x_{b} axis, in the plane of symmetry of the aircraft, positive below the aircraft
  - y_{b} (lateral) axis - perpendicular to the x_{b},z_{b}-plane, positive determined by the right-hand rule (generally, positive out the right wing)
- Wind frame
  - Origin - airplane center of gravity
  - x_{w} axis - positive in the direction of the velocity vector of the aircraft relative to the air
  - z_{w} axis - perpendicular to the x_{w} axis, in the plane of symmetry of the aircraft, positive below the aircraft
  - y_{w} axis - perpendicular to the x_{w},z_{w}-plane, positive determined by the right hand rule (generally, positive to the right)

The Euler angles linking these reference frames are:

- Earth frame to body frame: yaw angle ψ, pitch angle θ, and roll angle φ
- Earth frame to wind frame: heading angle σ, flight-path angle γ, and bank angle μ
- Wind frame to body frame: angle of sideslip β, angle of attack α (in this transformation, the angle analogous to φ and μ is always zero)

== Force balance and the steady flight equations ==
The forces acting on an aircraft in flight are the weight, aerodynamic force, and thrust. The weight is easiest to express in the Earth frame, where it has magnitude W and is in the +z_{E} direction, towards the center of the Earth. The weight is assumed to be constant over time and constant with altitude.

Expressing the aerodynamic force in the wind frame, it has a drag component with magnitude D opposite the velocity vector in the −x_{w} direction, a side force component with magnitude C in the +y_{w} direction, and a lift component with magnitude L in the −z_{w} direction.

In general, the thrust can have components along each body frame axis. For fixed wing aircraft with engines or propellers fixed relative to the fuselage, thrust is usually closely aligned with the +x_{b} direction. Other types of aircraft, such as rockets and airplanes that use thrust vectoring, can have significant components of thrust along the other body frame axes. In this article, aircraft are assumed to have thrust with magnitude T and fixed direction +x_{b}.

Steady flight is defined as flight where the aircraft's linear and angular velocity vectors are constant in a body-fixed reference frame such as the body frame or wind frame. In the Earth frame, the velocity may not be constant since the airplane may be turning, in which case the airplane has a centripetal acceleration $\frac{(V\cos{\gamma})^2}{R}$ in the x_{E}-y_{E} plane, where $V$ is the magnitude of the true airspeed and $R$ is the turn radius.

This equilibrium can be expressed along a variety of axes in a variety of reference frames. The traditional steady flight equations derive from expressing this force balance along three axes: the x_{w}-axis, the radial direction of the aircraft's turn in the x_{E}-y_{E} plane, and the axis perpendicular to x_{w} in the x_{w}-z_{E} plane,

$T\cos{\alpha}\cos{\beta} - W\sin{\gamma} - D = 0 \quad (x_w \text{-axis}),$

$C\cos{\mu} + L\sin{\mu} + T(\sin{\alpha}\sin{\mu} + \cos{\alpha}\cos{\mu}\sin{\beta}) = \frac{W}{g}\frac{(V\cos{\gamma})^2}{R} \quad (x_E\text{-}y_E\text{ plane radial direction}),$

$W\cos{\gamma} + C\sin{\mu} - L\cos{\mu} - T\sin{\alpha}\cos{\mu} = 0 \quad (\text{axis perpendicular to }x_w\text{ in the }x_w\text{-}z_E\text{ plane}),$

where g is the standard acceleration due to gravity.

These equations can be simplified with several assumptions that are typical of simple, fixed-wing flight. First, assume that the sideslip β is zero, or coordinated flight. Second, assume the side force C is zero. Third, assume that the angle of attack α is small enough that cos(α)≈1 and sin(α)≈α, which is typical since airplanes stall at high angles of attack. Similarly, assume that the flight-path angle γ is small enough that cos(γ)≈1 and sin(γ)≈γ, or equivalently that climbs and descents are at small angles relative to horizontal. Finally, assume that thrust is much smaller than lift, T≪L. Under these assumptions, the equations above simplify to

$T = W\gamma + D,$

$L\sin{\mu} = \frac{W}{g}\frac{V^2}{R},$

$L\cos{\mu} = W.$

These equations show that the thrust must be sufficiently large to cancel drag and the longitudinal component of weight. They also show that the lift must be sufficiently large to support the aircraft weight and accelerate the aircraft through turns.

Dividing the second equation by the third equation and solving for R shows that the turn radius can be written in terms of the true airspeed and the bank angle,

$R = \frac{V^2}{g\tan{\mu}}.$

The constant angular velocity in the body frame leads to a balance of moments, as well. Most notably, the pitching moment being zero puts a constraint on the longitudinal motion of the aircraft that can be used to determine the elevator control input.

=== Force balance in straight and level flight ===
In steady level longitudinal flight, also known as straight and level flight, the aircraft holds a constant heading, airspeed, and altitude. In this case, the flight-path angle γ = 0, the bank angle μ = 0, and the turn radius becomes infinitely large since the airplane is not turning. For steady level longitudinal flight, the steady flight equations simplify to

$T = D,$

$L = W.$

So, in this particular steady flight maneuver thrust counterbalances drag while lift supports the aircraft's weight. This force balance is pictured in the graphic at the beginning of the article.

== Steady flight maneuvers ==
The most general maneuver described by the steady flight equations above is a steady climbing or descending coordinated turn. The trajectory the aircraft flies during this maneuver is a helix with z_{E} as its axis and a circular projection on the x_{E}-y_{E} plane. Other steady flight maneuvers are special cases of this helical trajectory.

- Steady longitudinal climbs or descents (without turning): bank angle μ=0
- Steady level turns: flight-path angle γ=0
- Steady level longitudinal flight, also known as straight and level flight: bank angle μ=0 and flight-path angle γ=0
- Steady gliding descents (turning or longitudinal): thrust T=0

The definition of steady flight also allows for other maneuvers that are steady only instantaneously if the control inputs are held constant. These include the steady roll, where there is a constant and non-zero roll rate, and the steady pull up, where there is a constant but non-zero pitch rate.

== See also ==
- Flight dynamics (fixed-wing aircraft)
