= Helicopter dynamics =

Helicopter dynamics is a field within aerospace engineering concerned with theoretical and practical aspects of helicopter flight. It comprises helicopter aerodynamics, stability, control, structural dynamics, vibration, and aeroelastic and aeromechanical stability.

By studying the forces in helicopter flight, improved helicopter designs can be made, though due to the scale and speed of the dynamics, physical testing is non-trivial and expensive. In 2013, a combination of stereophotogrammetry and rigid-body correction in post processing was shown to be a valid tool for performing these studies, and the dynamics of a Robinson R44 helicopter were measured during hovering flight, to determine blade dynamics (e.g. harmonics) and the deflection profile.

== See also ==
- Flight dynamics (aircraft)
- Disc loading
- Rotordynamics
