= Ellrod index =

Technique for forecasting clear-air turbulence

In meteorology the Ellrod index is a technique for forecasting clear-air turbulence (CAT). It is calculated based on the product of horizontal deformation and vertical wind shear derived from numerical model forecast winds aloft.

The deformation predictors are calculated using following information.

- Shearing deformation:

$$DSH=\frac{dv}{dx} + \frac{du}{dy}$$.

- Stretching deformation:

$$DST = \frac{du}{dx} - \frac{dv}{dy}$$.

Where u and v are horizontal components of the wind.

- Total deformation equals to:

$$DEF = \sqrt{DSH^2 + DST^2}$$.

- Convergence:

$$CVG = -(\frac{du}{dx} + \frac{dv}{dy})$$

- Vertical wind shear:

$$VWS = \frac{\Delta V}{\Delta Z}$$

And the resulting index is given by:

$$EI = VWS \times (DEF + CVG)$$

To correspond to clear-air turbulence pilot reports the following table can be used:

Reported	EI value threshold
Light-Moderate	4
Moderate	8
Moderate-Severe	12

== See also ==
- Aviation Weather Center
