= David Davies (test pilot) =

British test pilot (1920–2003)

David Pettit Davies OBE DSC (11 April 1920 – 30 November 2003) was a British test pilot who was chief test pilot for the United Kingdom Civil Aviation Authority for 33 years. He was known as "the test pilots' test pilot".

== Career ==
Davies was born in Neath, South Wales. He joined the Royal Navy in 1940, and first served as a torpedo man. He survived the sinking of HMS Patia in April 1941. He joined the Fleet Air Arm, flying his first solo on a Tiger Moth in 1941, and served in 818 Naval Air Squadron on the carrier HMS Unicorn off Norway, Biscay and in the Salerno landings, flying the Fairey Swordfish. He was posted to 854 Naval Air Squadron in support of the D-Day landings. He saw service in the Far East on aircraft carrier HMS Illustrious, flying the Grumman TBF Avenger off Sumatra and Japan. He was awarded the DSC in 1945.

After the war he attended the Naval Maintenance Test Pilots' Course and the Empire Test Pilots' School in 1946, then was a military test pilot for three years in the Handling Squadron of the Empire Central Flying School at RAF Hullavington. In August 1949 he joined the Air Registration Board as chief test pilot. He drafted new rules about aircraft stability. Aircraft he tested included the de Havilland Comet, Bristol Britannia, Vickers VC10, Hawker Siddeley Trident, BAC One-Eleven, Boeing 747, Boeing 737, McDonnell Douglas DC-10, Lockheed L-1011 TriStar, and Concorde. He insisted Boeing modify the Boeing 707 to increase the fin size for improved directional control. He insisted the Trident, One-Eleven and Boeing 727 be fitted with stick pushers, to avoid deep stalls. At the time, stick pushers were controversial. During his work on the Comet, he worked with R. E. Bishop.

His book, Handling the Big Jets (1967), is a classic of aviation and is still recommended in the 21st century.

Davies was appointed Officer of the Order of the British Empire (OBE) in 1957. He was a Fellow of the Royal Aeronautical Society. He was given the Dorothy Spicer Award in 1966 by the Society of Licensed Aircraft Engineers. He married Jean, who died in 1996. They had two sons. He retired in 1982.

== Books ==
- Davies, David P. (1971). Handling the Big Jets: An Explanation of the Significant Differences in Flying Qualities Between Jet Transport Aeroplanes and Piston Engined Transport Aeroplanes, Together with Some Other Aspects of Jet Transport Handling (3rd ed.). Air Registration Board. ISBN 0903083019.
