= Dryden Wind Turbulence Model =

Mathematical model of continuous gusts

The Dryden wind turbulence model, also known as Dryden gusts, is a mathematical model of continuous gusts accepted for use by the United States Department of Defense in certain aircraft design and simulation applications. The Dryden model treats the linear and angular velocity components of continuous gusts as spatially varying stochastic processes and specifies each component's power spectral density. The Dryden wind turbulence model is characterized by rational power spectral densities, so exact filters can be designed that take white noise inputs and output stochastic processes with the Dryden gusts' power spectral densities.

== History ==
The Dryden model, named after Hugh Dryden, is one of the most commonly used models of continuous gusts. It was first published in 1952.

== Power Spectral Densities ==
The Dryden model is characterized by power spectral densities for gusts' three linear velocity components (u_{g},v_{g},w_{g}),

$$\begin{align}
\Phi_{u_g}(\Omega)&=\sigma_u^2\frac{2 L_u}{\pi} \frac{1}{1+ (L_u \Omega)^2} \\
\Phi_{v_g}(\Omega)&=\sigma_v^2\frac{2 L_v}{\pi} \frac{1+12(L_v \Omega)^2}{\left(1+ 4(L_v \Omega)^2 \right)^2} \\
\Phi_{w_g}(\Omega)&=\sigma_w^2\frac{2 L_w}{\pi} \frac{1+12(L_w \Omega)^2}{\left(1+ 4(L_w \Omega)^2 \right)^2}
\end{align}$$

where σ_{i} and L_{i} are the RMS velocity and length scale of turbulence, respectively, for the ith velocity component, and Ω is a spatial frequency. These power spectral densities give the stochastic process spatial variations, but any temporal variations rely on vehicle motion through the gust velocity field. The speed with which the vehicle is moving through the gust field V allows conversion of these power spectral densities to different types of frequencies,

$$\begin{align}
\Omega &= \frac{\omega}{V} \\
\Phi_i(\Omega) &= V\Phi_i\left(\frac{\omega}{V} \right)
\end{align}$$

where ω has units of radians per unit time.

The gust angular velocity components (p_{g},q_{g},r_{g}) are defined as the variations of the linear velocity components along the different vehicle axes,

$$\begin{align}
p_g &= \frac{\partial w_g}{\partial y} \\
q_g &= \frac{\partial w_g}{\partial x} \\
r_g &= -\frac{\partial v_g}{\partial x}
\end{align}$$

though different sign conventions may be used in some sources. The power spectral densities for the angular velocity components are

$$\begin{align}
\Phi_{p_g}(\omega) &= \frac{\sigma_w^2}{2VL_w}\frac{0.8\left(\frac{2\pi L_w}{4b}\right)^{\frac{1}{3}}}{1+ \left(\frac{4b\omega}{\pi V}\right)^2} \\
\Phi_{q_g}(\omega) &= \frac{\pm \left( \frac{\omega}{V} \right)^2}{1+ \left( \frac{4b\omega}{\pi V} \right)^2} \Phi_{w_g}(\omega) \\
\Phi_{r_g}(\omega) &= \frac{\mp \left( \frac{\omega}{V} \right)^2}{1+ \left( \frac{3b\omega}{\pi V} \right)^2} \Phi_{v_g}(\omega)
\end{align}$$

The military specifications give criteria based on vehicle stability derivatives to determine whether the gust angular velocity components are significant.

== Spectral Factorization ==
The gusts generated by the Dryden model are not white noise processes and therefore may be referred to as colored noise. Colored noise may, in some circumstances, be generated as the output of a minimum phase linear filter through a process known as spectral factorization. Consider a linear time invariant system with a white noise input that has unit variance, transfer function G(s), and output y(t). The power spectral density of y(t) is

$\Phi_y(\omega) = |G(i\omega)|^2$

where i^{2} = -1. For rational power spectral densities, such as that of the Dryden model, a suitable transfer function can be found whose magnitude squared evaluated along the imaginary axis is the power spectral density. The MATLAB documentation provides a realization of such a transfer function for Dryden gusts that is consistent with the military specifications,

$$\begin{align}
G_{u_g}(s) &= \sigma_u \sqrt{\frac{2L_u}{\pi V}} \frac{1}{1+\frac{L_u}{V}s} \\
G_{v_g}(s) &= \sigma_v \sqrt{\frac{2L_v}{\pi V}} \frac{1+\frac{2\sqrt{3}L_v}{V}s}{\left( 1+ \frac{2L_v}{V}s \right)^2} \\
G_{w_g}(s) &= \sigma_w \sqrt{\frac{2L_w}{\pi V}} \frac{1+\frac{2\sqrt{3}L_w}{V}s}{\left( 1+ \frac{2L_w}{V}s \right)^2} \\
G_{p_g}(s) &= \sigma_w \sqrt{\frac{0.8}{V}} \frac{ \left( \frac{\pi}{4b} \right)^{\frac{1}{6}} }{(2L_w)^{\frac{1}{3}} \left(1 + \frac{4b}{\pi V}s \right)} \\
G_{q_g}(s) &= \frac{ \pm \frac{s}{V}}{1+\frac{4b}{\pi V}s} G_{w_g}(s) \\
G_{r_g}(s) &= \frac{ \mp \frac{s}{V}}{1+\frac{3b}{\pi V}s} G_{v_g}(s)
\end{align}$$

Driving these filters with independent, unit variance, band-limited white noise yields outputs with power spectral densities that match the spectra of the velocity components of the Dryden model. The outputs can, in turn, be used as wind disturbance inputs for aircraft or other dynamic systems.

== Altitude Dependence ==
The Dryden model is parameterized by a length scale and turbulence intensity. The combination of these two parameters determines the shape of the power spectral densities and therefore the quality of the model's fit to spectra of observed turbulence. Many combinations of length scale and turbulence intensity give realistic power spectral densities in the desired frequency ranges. The Department of Defense specifications include choices for both parameters, including their dependence on altitude.

== See also ==
- Continuous gusts
- Von Kármán wind turbulence model
