= Von Kármán wind turbulence model =

Mathematical model of continuous gusts

The von Kármán wind turbulence model (also known as von Kármán gusts) is a mathematical model of continuous gusts. It matches observed continuous gusts better than that Dryden Wind Turbulence Model and is the preferred model of the United States Department of Defense in most aircraft design and simulation applications. The von Kármán model treats the linear and angular velocity components of continuous gusts as spatially varying stochastic processes and specifies each component's power spectral density. The von Kármán wind turbulence model is characterized by irrational power spectral densities, so filters can be designed that take white noise inputs and output stochastic processes with the approximated von Kármán gusts' power spectral densities.

== History ==
The von Kármán wind turbulence model first appeared in a 1957 NACA report based on earlier work by Theodore von Kármán.

== Power spectral densities ==
The von Kármán model is characterized by single-sided power spectral densities for gusts' three linear velocity components (u_{g}, v_{g}, and w_{g}),

$$\begin{align}
\Phi_{u_g}(\Omega)&=\sigma_u^2\frac{2 L_u}{\pi} \frac{1}{ \left(1+ (1.339 L_u \Omega)^2 \right)^\frac{5}{6}} \\
\Phi_{v_g}(\Omega)&=\sigma_v^2\frac{2L_v}{\pi} \frac{1+\frac{8}{3}(2.678 L_v \Omega)^2}{\left(1+ (2.678 L_v \Omega)^2 \right)^{\frac{11}{6}}} \\
\Phi_{w_g}(\Omega)&=\sigma_w^2\frac{2 L_w}{\pi} \frac{1+\frac{8}{3}(2.678 L_w \Omega)^2}{\left(1+ (2.678 L_w \Omega)^2 \right)^{\frac{11}{6}}}
\end{align}$$

where σ_{i} and L_{i} are the turbulence intensity and scale length, respectively, for the ith velocity component, and Ω is spatial frequency. These power spectral densities give the stochastic process spatial variations, but any temporal variations rely on vehicle motion through the gust velocity field. The speed with which the vehicle is moving through the gust field V allows conversion of these power spectral densities to different types of frequencies,

$$\begin{align}
\Omega &= \frac{\omega}{V} \\
\Phi_i(\Omega) &= V\Phi_i\left( \omega \right)
\end{align}$$

where ω has units of radians per unit time.

The gust angular velocity components (p_{g}, q_{g}, r_{g}) are defined as the variations of the linear velocity components along the different vehicle axes,

$$\begin{align}
p_g &= \frac{\partial w_g}{\partial y} \\
q_g &= \frac{\partial w_g}{\partial x} \\
r_g &= -\frac{\partial v_g}{\partial x}
\end{align}$$

though different sign conventions may be used in some sources. The power spectral densities for the angular velocity components are

$$\begin{align}
\Phi_{p_g}(\omega) &= \frac{\sigma_w^2}{2VL_w}\frac{0.8\left(\frac{2\pi L_w}{4b}\right)^{\frac{1}{3}}}{1+ \left(\frac{4b\omega}{\pi V}\right)^2} \\
\Phi_{q_g}(\omega) &= \frac{\pm \left( \frac{\omega}{V} \right)^2}{1+ \left( \frac{4b\omega}{\pi V} \right)^2} \Phi_{w_g}(\omega) \\
\Phi_{r_g}(\omega) &= \frac{\mp \left( \frac{\omega}{V} \right)^2}{1+ \left( \frac{3b\omega}{\pi V} \right)^2} \Phi_{v_g}(\omega)
\end{align}$$

The military specifications give criteria based on vehicle stability derivatives to determine whether the gust angular velocity components are significant.

== Spectral factorization ==
The gusts generated by the von Kármán model are not a white noise process and therefore may be referred to as colored noise. Colored noise may, in some circumstances, be generated as the output of a minimum phase linear filter through a process known as spectral factorization. Consider a linear time invariant system with a white noise input that has unit variance, transfer function G(s), and output y(t). The power spectral density of y(t) is

$\Phi_y(\omega) = |G(i\omega)|^2$

where i^{2} = -1. For irrational power spectral densities, such as that of the von Kármán model, a suitable transfer function can be found whose magnitude squared evaluated along the imaginary axis approximates the power spectral density. The MATLAB documentation provides a realization of such a transfer function for von Kármán gusts that is consistent with the military specifications,

$$\begin{align}
G_{u_g}(s) &= \frac{ \sigma_u \sqrt{\frac{2L_u}{\pi V}} \left(1+0.25\frac{L_u}{V}s \right)}{1+1.357\frac{L_u}{V}s+0.1987\left(\frac{L_u}{V}s\right)^2} \\
G_{v_g}(s) &= \frac{ \sigma_v \sqrt{\frac{2L_v}{\pi V}} \left( 1+2.7478\frac{2L_v}{V}s + 0.3398\left(\frac{2L_v}{V}s\right)^2 \right)}{1+ 2.9958\frac{2L_v}{V}s + 1.9754 \left(\frac{2L_v}{V}s\right)^2 + 0.1539 \left(\frac{2L_v}{V}s\right)^3} \\
G_{w_g}(s) &= \frac{ \sigma_w \sqrt{\frac{2L_w}{\pi V}} \left( 1+2.7478\frac{2L_w}{V}s + 0.3398\left(\frac{2L_w}{V}s\right)^2 \right)}{1+ 2.9958\frac{2L_w}{V}s + 1.9754 \left(\frac{2L_w}{V}s\right)^2 + 0.1539 \left(\frac{2L_w}{V}s\right)^3} \\
G_{p_g}(s) &= \sigma_w \sqrt{\frac{0.8}{V}} \frac{ \left( \frac{\pi}{4b} \right)^{\frac{1}{6}} }{(2L_w)^{\frac{1}{3}} \left(1 + \frac{4b}{\pi V}s \right)} \\
G_{q_g}(s) &= \frac{ \pm \frac{s}{V}}{1+\frac{4b}{\pi V}s} G_{w_g}(s) \\
G_{r_g}(s) &= \frac{ \mp \frac{s}{V}}{1+\frac{3b}{\pi V}s} G_{v_g}(s)
\end{align}$$

Driving these filters with independent, unit variance, band-limited white noise yields outputs with power spectral densities that approximate the power spectral densities of the velocity components of the von Kármán model. The outputs can, in turn, be used as wind disturbance inputs for aircraft or other dynamic systems.

== Altitude dependence ==
The von Kármán model is parameterized by a length scale and turbulence intensity. The combination of these two parameters determine the shape of the power spectral densities and therefore the quality of the model's fit to spectra of observed turbulence. Many combinations of length scale and turbulence intensity give realistic power spectral densities in the desired frequency ranges. The Department of Defense specifications include choices for both parameters, including their dependence on altitude.

== See also ==
- Continuous gusts
- Dryden Wind Turbulence Model
