= Wren 460 =

American STOL aircraft

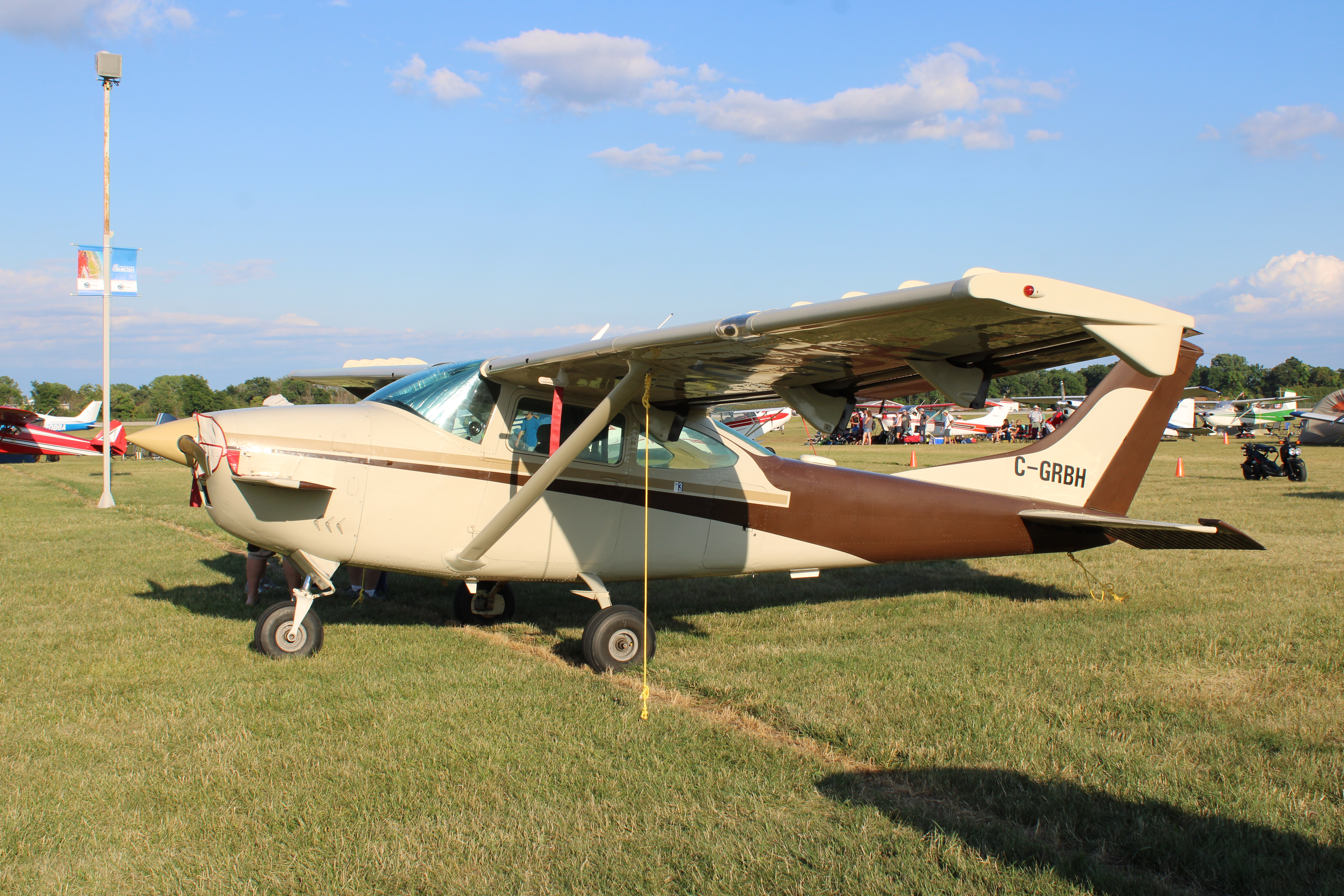
- Wren 460P at EAA AirVenture Oshkosh in 2023

General information
- Type: STOL light aircraft
- National origin: United States
- Manufacturer: Wren Aircraft Company; Peterson's Performance Plus
- Designer: Jim Robertson
- Number built: 700+

History
- First flight: January 1963
- Developed from: Cessna 182 Skylane; Robertson Skylark SRX-1

The Wren 460 is the original version of a series of aircraft that are STOL conversions of the Cessna 182 Skylane. The conversions have been offered by several companies since the US Federal Aviation Administration granted a Supplemental Type Certificate to the Wren Aircraft Company in 1964.

== Design and development ==
The Wren 460 traces its history to the Skyshark, a modification of the earlier Robertson Skylark SRX-1, built by James Robertson, son of Robertson Aircraft Corporation founder William B. Robertson, in the late 1950s. The Skyshark incorporated a number of modifications, most notably a canard fitted with elevators in the slipstream behind the propeller. It was a technological success but too expensive to produce.

Robertson incorporated many features of the Skyshark into the Wren Aircraft Company's Wren 460. A conversion of the Cessna 182 Skylane (Note: According to a 1963 Popular Mechanics article, a Cessna 180 airframe could also be converted to a Wren 460. According to 1968 company documents, conversion kits for Cessna 180 and 185 Skywagon airframes were under development and the Wren's "Beta" reversible-pitch propeller was already certified as a supplemental type certificate for the 180.) airframe, the Wren 460 featured full-span double-slotted flaps, movable spoilers to assist the ailerons with roll control, and an optional reversible pitch propeller for shorter landing runs. Like the Skyshark, the Wren 460 also featured a set of canards immediately behind the propeller, taking advantage of the propeller's airstream and allowing the nose to pitch up even when the aircraft is motionless. The stall angle of the airfoil was also changed from 16 to 20 degrees by the addition of a drooped leading edge cuff, a modification that would later be incorporated in the standard 182.

== Operational history ==
The Wren 460, modified from a Cessna 182A, made its first flight in January 1963, and Wren Aircraft Company, based at Meacham Airport in Fort Worth, Texas, received a Supplemental Type Certificate from the Federal Aviation Administration on June 30, 1964.

Pilots praised the Wren 460 for its STOL performance. Kevin Brown of Popular Mechanics noted that it "lands like a carrier plane", but also noted that such a touchdown was "quite hard". Despite the publicity of its initial release, few were built — due in part to its price, which was over twice that of a stock Cessna 182 at the time. Wren Aircraft eventually went bankrupt in 1969 after the United States military rejected its projects.

Following the bankruptcy of Wren, the Supplemental Type Certificate for the Wren 460 modifications was sold to Galen Means of Wichita, Kansas, who sold to it to Todd Peterson of Thedford, Nebraska in 1977. Peterson set up a company, Advanced Lift Systems, at Buckeye Municipal Airport in Arizona and in 1983 began production of the Wren 460 once again as the Wren 460P, this time modified from used 182 airframes of newer models as opposed to the new, early model airframes of the original. Unlike the original, the Wren 460P did not have the option of a reversible propeller as Peterson believed it offered too little benefit for its cost. In 1985 the company moved from Buckeye to Eloy Municipal Airport in Arizona. By 1986, a freshly-modified Wren 460P cost less than a new 182 by almost $20,000. That year a version with fewer modifications was introduced as the 260SE.

In 2006 a version with a redesigned larger baggage compartment, wings extended by eighteen inches (45.7 cm) each side – increasing the standard 182's 36-foot-0-inch (10.97 m) wingspan to 39 feet 0 inches (11.89 m) – and heavy-duty landing gear was introduced, marketed as the Katmai. As of 2026, the modifications are offered by Peterson's Performance Plus at El Dorado/Captain Jack Thomas Memorial Airport in El Dorado, Kansas, marketed as the Kenai and King Katmai; both are powered by a 300 horsepower (220 kW) Continental IO-550 engine.

== Variants ==
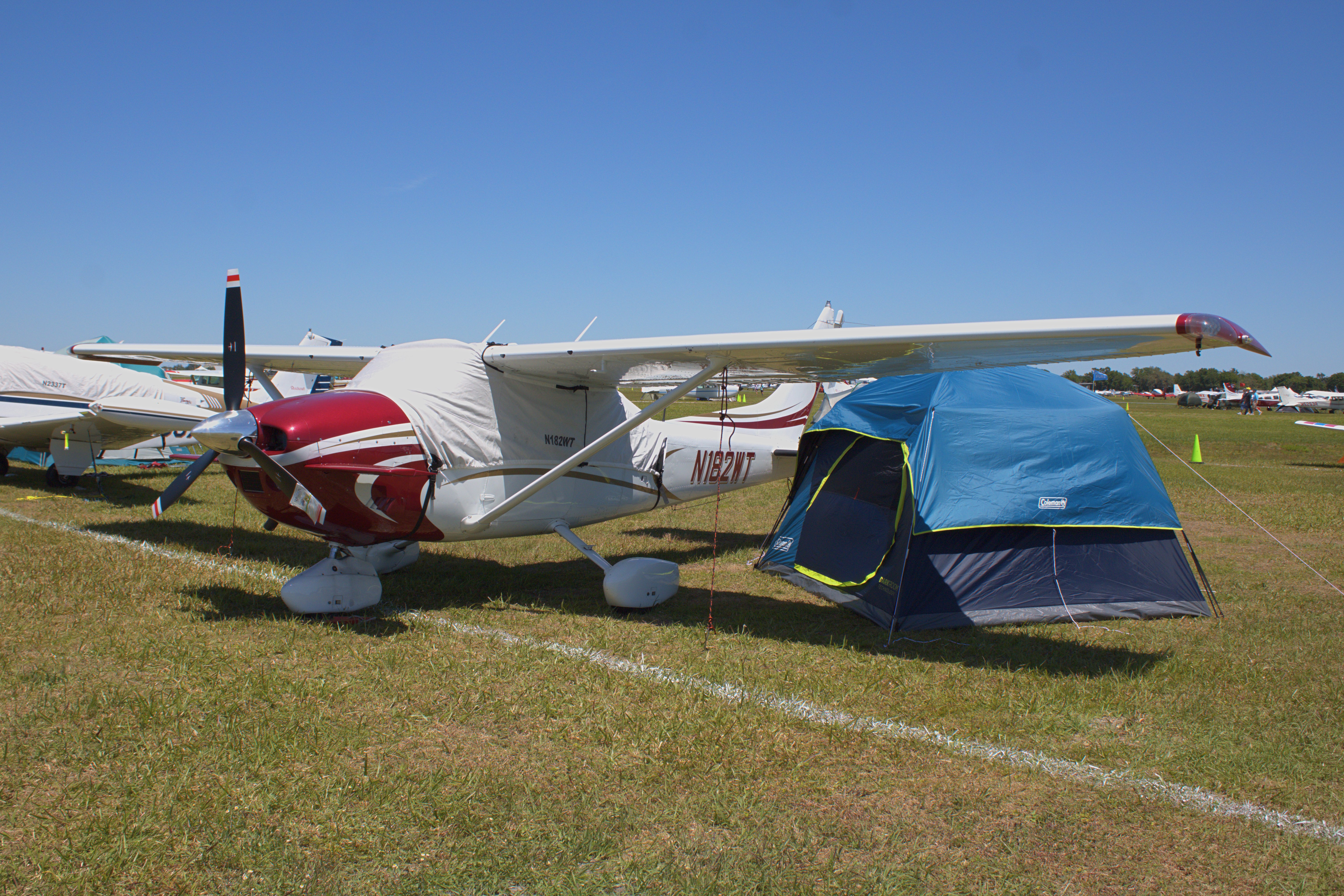
Peterson 260SE

Wren 460
Original conversions by Wren Aircraft Company. About 200 modified from new Cessna 182 airframes.
Wren 460 Beta
Wren 460 with optional reversible propeller.
Wren 460C
Planned Wren conversion of the Cessna 180. Engineering had been completed by January 1968, though the company had yet to produce or flight test any aircraft. Unlike previous models, the Wren 460C would have been able to operate with skis or floats.
Wren 460G
Designation of aircraft converted from 182G airframes.
Wren 460H
Designation of aircraft converted from new 182H airframes. Certified June 1965.
Wren 460P
Conversions by Advanced Lift Systems (later Peterson's Performance Plus). Modified from used 182H through 182M airframes, no option for reversible propeller.
Wren 460QB
"Quiet Bird". Modified Wren 460B to compete with the Lockheed YO-3 Quiet Star. Speculated to have been a candidate for the ZO-4A designation, with the United States Air Force proposing to buy 28 aircraft before the O-4 program was canceled in 1970.
Peterson 260SE
Simplified conversion with stock wings and a 260 horsepower (193.9 kW) Continental IO-470-F engine in place of the 230 horsepower (171.5 kW) O-470 of an original 182. Over 500 converted.
Peterson 230SE
Further simplified conversion with only the canard modification.
Super Skylane
Non-STOL conversion of the 182 with the 260 horsepower (193.9 kW) IO-470-F.
Bushmaster
Version of the 260SE with strengthened landing gear and large tires, intended for bush flying.
Katmai
Peterson 260SE with wingspan increased by 36 inches (91.4 cm) from the standard 182's 36 feet 0 inches (10.97 m), to 39 feet 0 inches (11.89 m), enlarged baggage compartment and heavy-duty landing gear.
King Katmai
Katmai with a 300 horsepower (223.7 kW) Continental IO-550 engine.
Kenai
King Katmai with stock 182 wings.

== Specifications (Wren 460) ==
Data from Jane's All The World's Aircraft 1988-89

General characteristics

- Crew: 1
- Capacity: 3 passengers
- Length: 27 ft 4 in (8.33 m)
- Wingspan: 35 ft 10 in (10.92 m)
- Height: 9 ft 0 in (2.74 m)
- Wing area: 175.4 sq ft (16.30 m^{2})
- Empty weight: 1,697 lb (770 kg)
- Gross weight: 2,800 lb (1,270 kg) normal
- Max takeoff weight: 3,650 lb (1,656 kg) restricted category
- Fuel capacity: 80 US Gallon (303 L)
- Powerplant: 1 × Continental IO-470-R air cooled flat-six, 260 hp (190 kW)

Performance

- Maximum speed: 160 mph (260 km/h, 140 kn) max cruise
- Cruise speed: 140 mph (230 km/h, 120 kn) econ cruise
- Stall speed: 29 mph (47 km/h, 25 kn) (power off, flaps down)
- Range: 980 mi (1,580 km, 850 nmi)
- Service ceiling: 19,200 ft (5,900 m)
- Rate of climb: 1,080 ft/min (5.5 m/s)
- Take-off to and landing from 50 ft (15 m): 560 ft (171 m)
