= NPO Molniya =

Coordinates: 55°50′28″N 37°26′55″E

- Company type: Open joint-stock company
- Industry: Science and production
- Founded: February 26, 1976; 49 years ago
- Headquarters: Moscow, Russia
- Products: Aircraft
- Owner: Rostec (60%)
- Website: npomolniya.ru

NPO Molniya (lightning) (Russian: Научно-производственное объединение «Молния») is a Russian scientific and production enterprise, founded on February 26, 1976. Currently part of Rostec.

== Space systems ==
At present, NPO Molniya is working on reusable launch systems for space applications.

== Aircraft ==
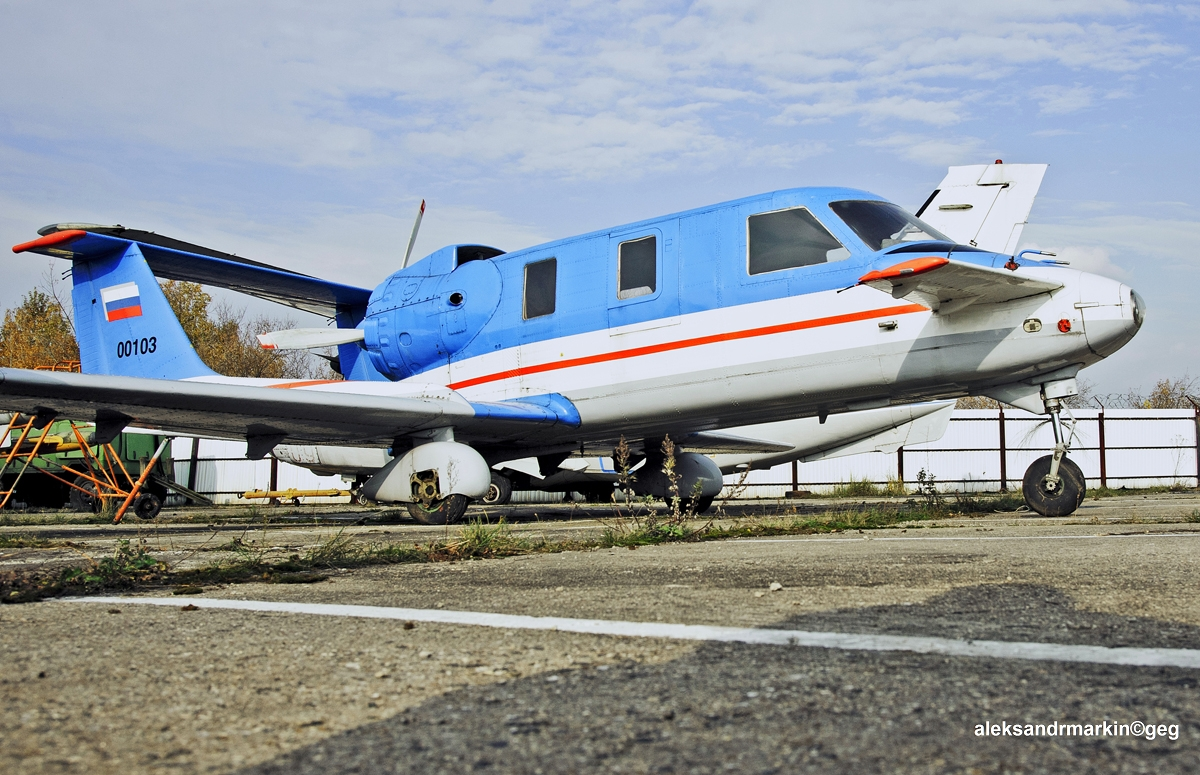
Triplane Molniya-1

The NPO Molniya Molniya-1 is a three surface design with single pusher propeller and twin tail booms. In the late 1990s, the company proposed a number of larger types based on the three surface configuration.

- Molniya 400 - a proposed jet cargo aircraft or airliner with a high-mounted wing and powered by two PS-90A turbofans. Freighter version would have had a rear fuselage ramp.
- Molniya-1000 Heracles - a proposed super heavy freighter to replace the VM-T Atlant and An-225 as a space load carrier. Unusual twin open fuselage design with the shuttle or other payload carried between the fuselages. A high mounted wing with six turbofan engines was proposed, it would have been capable of carrying a 450,000kg load. Displayed as model at the 2003 Paris Air Show

== Ownership ==
Since September 2018 the controlling (60%) stake belongs to the Kalashnikov Concern.

== Products ==
=== Aircraft ===
- NPO Molniya Molniya-1

=== Manned Spacecraft ===
- Buran spacecraft

== See also ==
- Gleb Lozino-Lozinskiy, lead developer of Buran, General Director of NPO Molniya
