= Macchi M.B.320 =

Italian cabin monoplane

Macchi MB.320
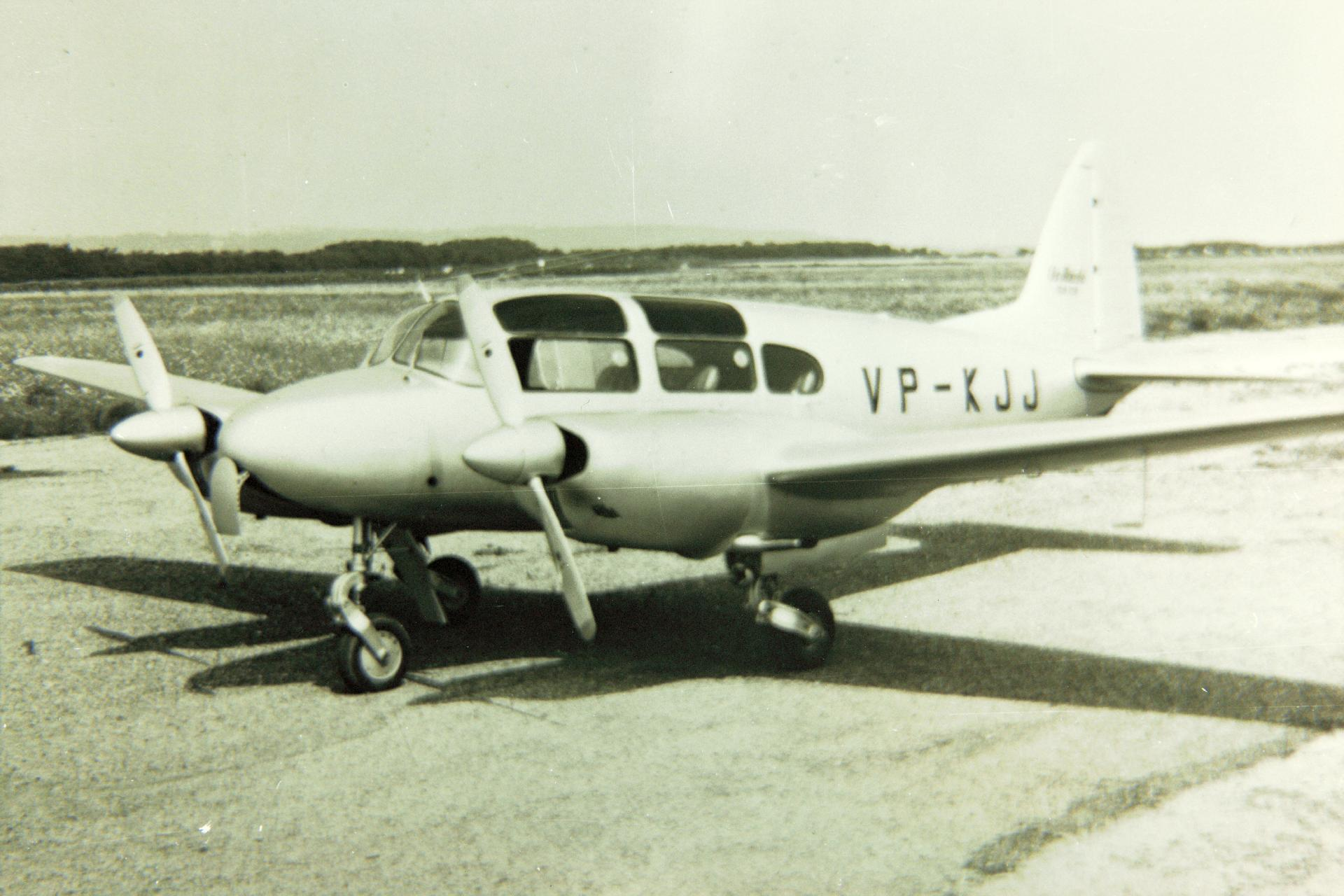
- M.B.320 before delivery to East African Airways

General information
- Type: Cabin monoplane
- National origin: Italy
- Manufacturer: Macchi
- Primary user: East African Airways
- Number built: 8

History
- First flight: 20 May 1949

The Macchi MB.320 was an Italian cabin monoplane designed and built by Macchi. Only a small number were built.

== Design and development ==
The MB.320 was built using experience gained from the company's previous aircraft, the MB.308. The MB.320 was a low-wing cabin monoplane with retractable tricycle landing gear and powered by two wing-mounted 184 hp (137 kW) Continental E185 engines. It had room for a pilot and five passengers.

== Operational history ==
The prototype MB.320, registered I-RAIA, was first flown on 20 May 1949. The aircraft flew well, but was expensive to buy with only a small domestic market for the type and only a small number were exported. Three aircraft were sold to East African Airways for use as feederliners.

== Variants ==
MB.320
Six-seat monoplane powered by two 184 hp (137 kW) Continental E185 engines. Eight built
VEMA-51
Proposed license-built variant to have been produced in France by SFCA. Not built.

== Specifications (Macchi MB.320) ==
Data from Jane's All The World's Aircraft 1953-54

General characteristics

- Crew: 2
- Capacity: 4 passengers
- Length: 8.65 m (28 ft 5 in)
- Wingspan: 13.0 m (42 ft 8 in)
- Height: 3.19 m (10 ft 6 in)
- Wing area: 21.0 m^{2} (226 sq ft)
- Empty weight: 1,490 kg (3,285 lb)
- Gross weight: 2,250 kg (4,960 lb)
- Fuel capacity: 400 L (110 US gal; 88 imp gal)
- Powerplant: 2 × Continental E185 air-cooled flat-six engines, 138 kW (185 hp) each

Performance

- Maximum speed: 322 km/h (200 mph, 174 kn)
- Cruise speed: 285 km/h (177 mph, 154 kn) at 2,000 m (6,600 ft) (70% power)
- Range: 1,000 km (620 mi, 540 nmi)
- Service ceiling: 5,200 m (17,100 ft)
- Time to altitude:
  - 3 min 8 s to 1,000 m (3,300 ft)
  - 12 min 24 s to 3,000 m (9,800 ft)
