= Fanaero-Chile Chincol =

Chincol

General information
- Type: Trainer aircraft
- Manufacturer: Fanaero-Chile

History
- First flight: 14 December 1955

The Fanaero-Chile Chincol (named for a South American sparrow) was a prototype trainer aircraft developed in Chile in 1955 for air force use. It was a conventional, low-wing cantilever monoplane of mixed construction, with fabric covered wooden wings and tail surfaces (making extensive use of Mañío, an indigenous wood). It was fitted with a fixed tailwheel undercarriage and was powered by a single 215 horsepower (160 kW) Continental O-470 air-cooled horizontally opposed piston engine. The pilot and instructor sat in tandem, and were enclosed under a long canopy. The prototype Chincol made its maiden flight on 14 December 1955. The Chilean Air Force responded positively to the design, and placed an order for 50 machines. However, technical problems significantly delayed manufacture, and the order was cancelled before the aircraft were produced.

== Specifications ==
Data from Jane's All The World's Aircraft 1956–57

General characteristics

- Crew: 2
- Length: 7.22 m (23 ft 8 in)
- Wingspan: 10.40 m (34 ft 1 in)
- Height: 2.10 m (6 ft 11 in)
- Wing area: 15.7 m^{2} (169 sq ft)
- Aspect ratio: 6.8:1
- Airfoil: NACA 23015 (root), NACA 23009 (tip)
- Empty weight: 740 kg (1,631 lb)
- Gross weight: 1,050 kg (2,315 lb)
- Powerplant: 1 × Continental O-470-11 air-cooled flat-six, 160 kW (215 hp)

Performance

- Maximum speed: 210 km/h (130 mph, 110 kn) at sea level
- Cruise speed: 185 km/h (115 mph, 100 kn)
- Stall speed: 90 km/h (56 mph, 49 kn)
- Range: 650 km (400 mi, 350 nmi) (cruising radius)
- Service ceiling: 5,400 m (17,700 ft)
- Rate of climb: 4.09 m/s (805 ft/min)
- Take-off distance to 15 m (50 ft): 240 m (790 ft)
- Landing distance from 15 m (50 ft): 650 m (2,130 ft)
