= Associated Air Liberty 181 =

American homebuilt aircraft

Liberty 181

General information
- Type: Homebuilt aircraft
- National origin: United States
- Manufacturer: Associated Air
- Status: Production completed
- Number built: at least one

History
- Introduction date: late 1990s

The Associated Air Liberty 181 is an American homebuilt aircraft that was designed and produced by Associated Air of Woodland, Washington, introduced in the late 1990s. When it was available the aircraft was supplied as a kit for amateur construction.

== Design and development ==
The Liberty 181 was designed as a bushplane for hauling heavy loads into unprepared airstrips. It features a strut-braced high-wing, a four-seat enclosed cabin with doors, fixed conventional landing gear and a single engine in tractor configuration.

The aircraft is made from mixed metal and composites and features extra large doors for loading bulky items. Its 40.00 ft (12.2 m) span wing mounts flaps, has a wing area of 200.00 sq ft (18.581 m^{2}) and is supported by two parallel lift struts per side, with jury struts. The cabin width is 48 in (120 cm). The acceptable power range is 230 to 300 hp (172 to 224 kW) and the standard engine used is the 230 hp (172 kW) Continental O-470 powerplant, with a constant speed propeller. With that engine installed the take-off distance is 200 ft (61 m) and the landing distance is 250 ft (76 m).

The aircraft has an empty weight of 1,890 lb (860 kg) and a gross weight of 3,200 lb (1,500 kg), giving a useful load of 1,310 lb (590 kg). With full fuel of 100 U.S. gallons (380 L; 83 imp gal) the payload is 710 lb (320 kg).

Factory supplied options included floats and skis. The manufacturer estimates the construction time from the supplied kit as 2000 hours.

== Operational history ==
By 1998 the company reported that 7 kits had been sold, with one aircraft flying.

In October 2016 no examples were registered in the United States with the Federal Aviation Administration, although one had been previously registered and exported to Canada. In October 2016 one was registered with Transport Canada, having been built in the US in 1996 and imported in 2008.

== Specifications (Liberty 181) ==
Data from AeroCrafter

General characteristics

- Crew: one
- Capacity: three passengers
- Length: 24 ft 0 in (7.32 m)
- Wingspan: 40 ft 0 in (12.19 m)
- Wing area: 200.00 sq ft (18.581 m^{2})
- Empty weight: 1,890 lb (857 kg)
- Gross weight: 3,200 lb (1,451 kg)
- Fuel capacity: 100 U.S. gallons (380 L; 83 imp gal)
- Powerplant: 1 × Continental O-470 six cylinder, air-cooled, four stroke aircraft engine, 230 hp (170 kW)
- Propellers: 2-bladed constant speed propeller

Performance

- Maximum speed: 90 mph (145 km/h, 78 kn)
- Cruise speed: 130 mph (210 km/h, 110 kn)
- Stall speed: 38 mph (61 km/h, 33 kn) flaps down
- Range: 1,200 mi (1,900 km, 1,000 nmi)
- Service ceiling: 22,050 ft (6,720 m)
- Rate of climb: 2,000 ft/min (10 m/s)
- Wing loading: 16.0 lb/sq ft (78 kg/m^{2})
