= Fanaero-Chile =

Defunct Chilean aircraft manufacturer

Fanaero-Chile was a Chilean aircraft manufacturer established as Fábrica Nacional de Aéronaves in 1953 at Los Cerrillos Airport, but which later moved to Rancagua. The firm developed a trainer for the Chilean Air Force, the Chincol, and although 50 were ordered, it was not able to complete the order. A prototype for a jet aircraft was abandoned when the company ceased operations in 1960.
