= Three-surface aircraft =

Fixed-wing aircraft with a main central wing plus fore and aft surfaces

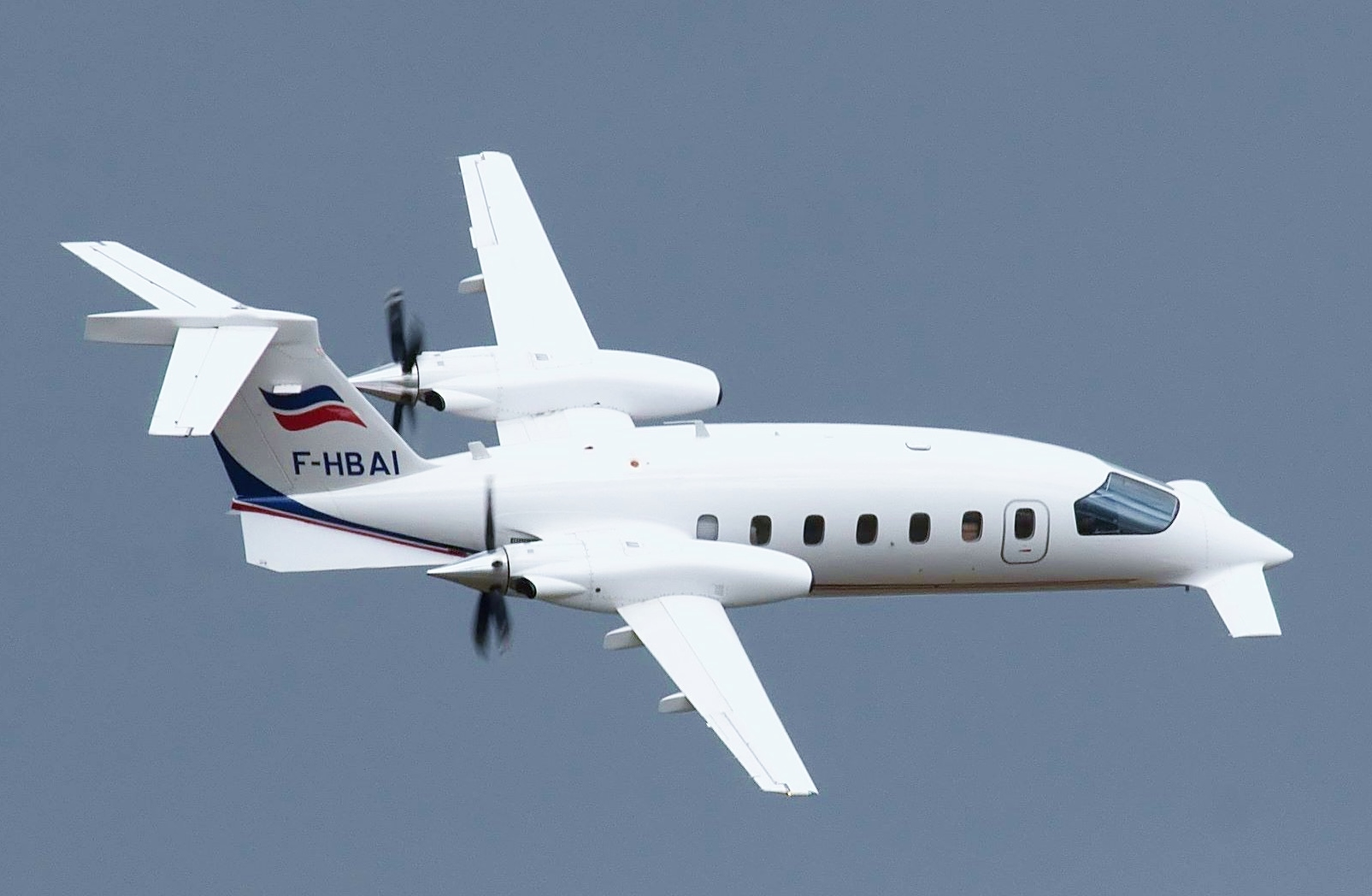
A Piaggio P.180 Avanti showing its three lifting surfaces

A three-surface aircraft, or sometimes three-lifting-surface aircraft, has a foreplane, a central wing and a tailplane. The central wing surface always provides lift and is usually the largest, while the functions of the fore and aft planes may vary between types and may include lift, control or stability.

In civil aircraft the three-surface configuration may be used to give safe stalling characteristics and short takeoff and landing (STOL) performance. It is also claimed to allow minimizing the total wing surface area, reducing the accompanying skin drag. In combat aircraft this configuration may also be used to enhance maneuverability both before and beyond the stall, often in conjunction with vectored thrust.

== History ==
An early designation used in 1911 was "three plane system". The Fernic designs of the 1920s were referred to as "tandem". While there are indeed two lifting wing surfaces in tandem, the tailplane forms a third horizontal surface.

=== Pioneer experiments ===
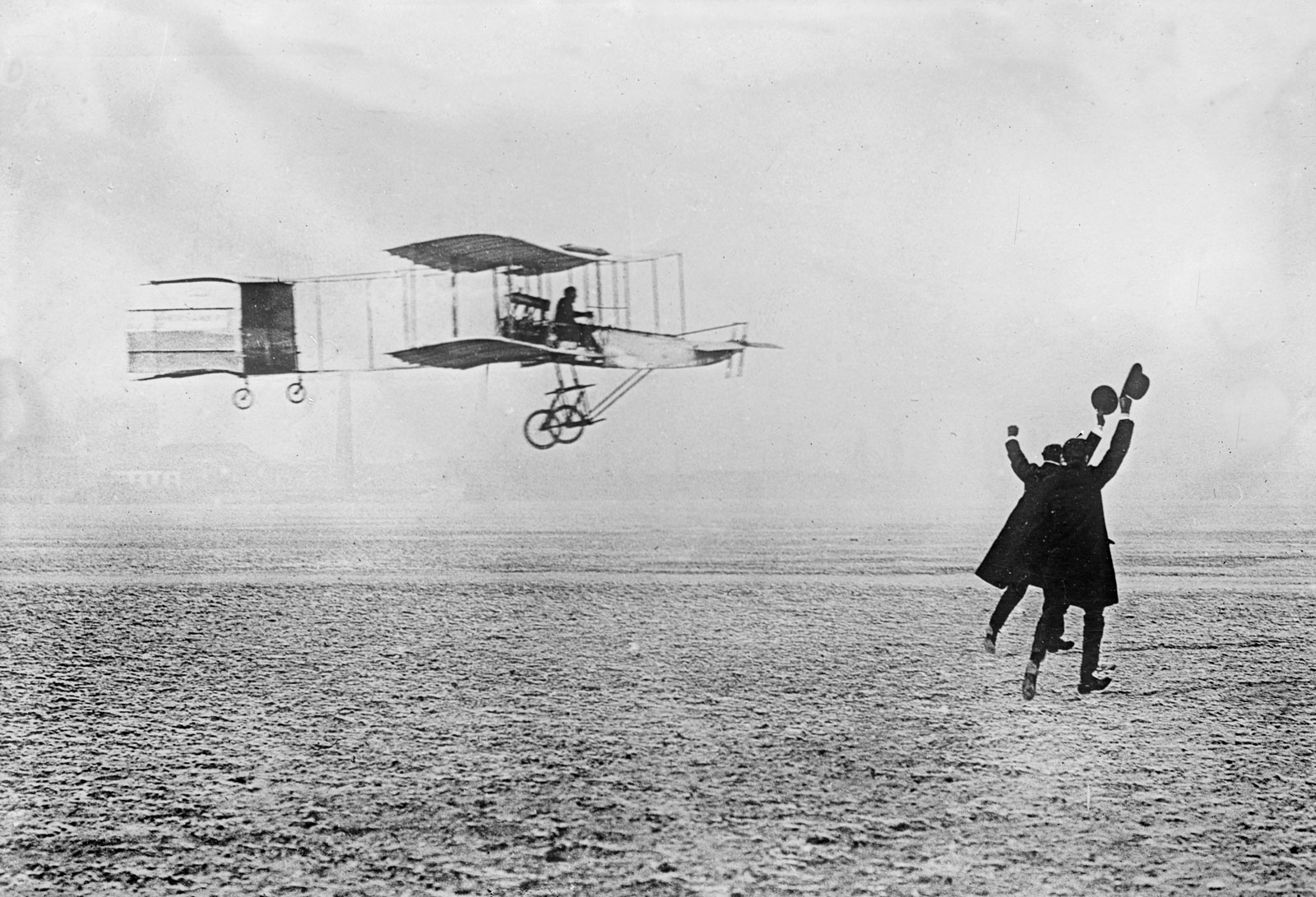
1908 Voisin–Farman I

During the pioneer years of aviation a number of aircraft were flown with both fore and aft auxiliary surfaces. The issue of control vs. stability was poorly understood and typically pitch control was on the front surface with the rear surface also lifting, leading to instability in pitch. The Kress Drachenflieger of 1901 and Dufaux triplane of 1908 had insufficient power to take off. More successful types included the Voisin–Farman I (1907) and Curtiss No. 1 (1909). The Wright Brothers too experimented on the basic Flyer design in an effort to obtain both controllability and stability, flying it at various times in first canard, then three-surface and finally conventional configurations. By the outbreak of the First World War in 1914, the main wing with smaller rear tail surface had become the conventional configuration and few three-surface types would be flown for many years. The Fokker V.8 of 1917 and Caproni Ca.60 Noviplano of 1921 were both failures.

=== Soft stall and STOL ===
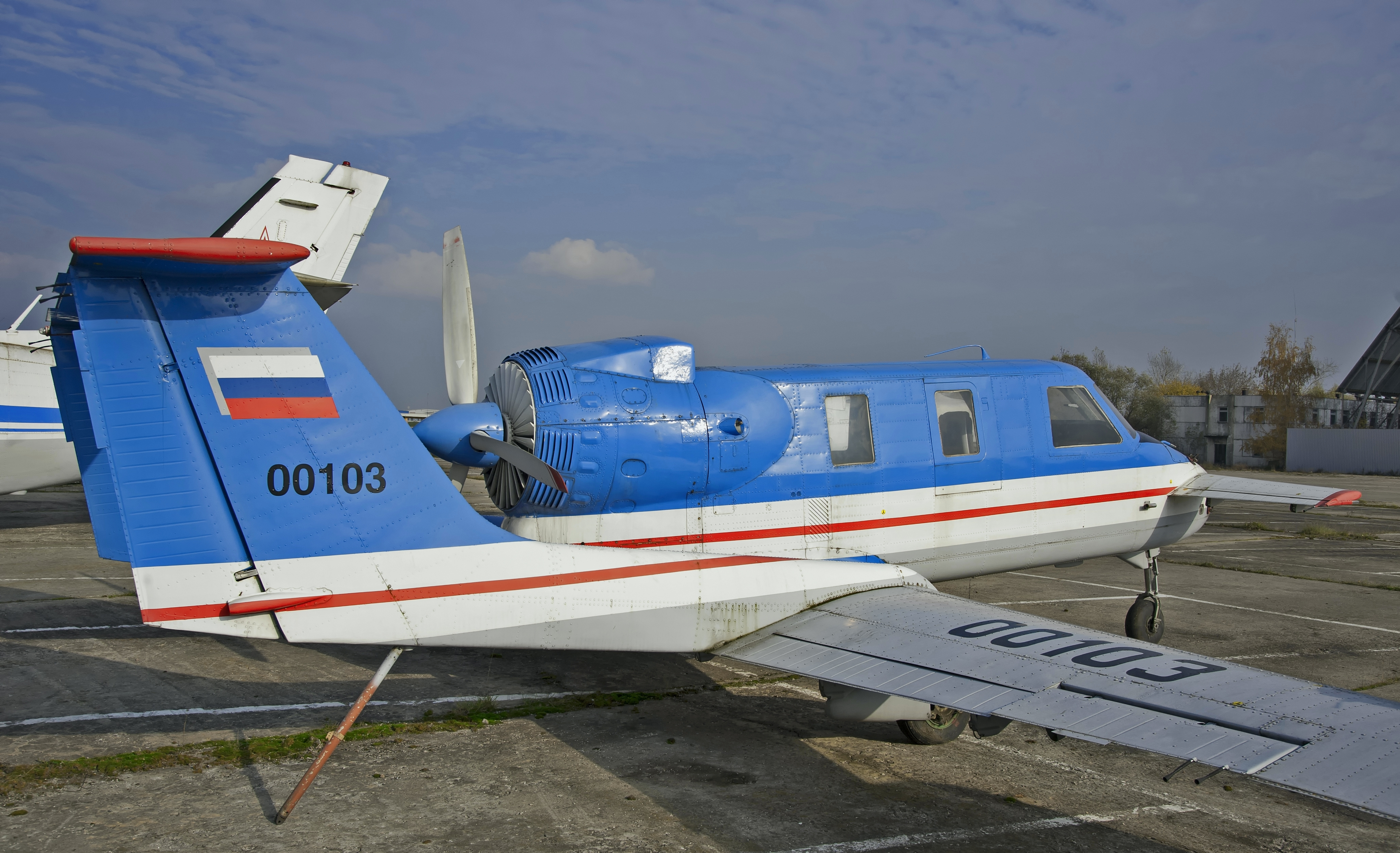
Molniya-1

In 1920s George Fernic developed the idea of two lifting surfaces in tandem, together with a conventional tailplane. The small foreplane was highly loaded and as the angle of attack increased it was designed to stall first, causing the nose to drop and allowing the aircraft to recover safely without stalling the main wing. This "soft" stall provides a level of safety in the stall which is not usually present in conventional designs. The Fernic T-9, a three-surface monoplane, flew in 1929. Fernic was killed in an accident while flying its successor, the FT-10 Cruisaire.

It is possible to achieve such a soft stall with a pure canard design, but it is then difficult to control the pitching and oscillations can develop as the foreplane repeatedly lifts the nose, stalls and recovers. Also, care must be taken in the design that the turbulent wake from the stalled foreplane does not in itself disturb the airflow over the main wing sufficiently to cause significant loss of lift and cancel out the nose-down pitching moment. In the three-surface design the third, tail surface does not stall and provides better controllability.

In the 1950s James Robertson developed his experimental Skyshark. This was a broadly conventional design but with a variety of features, including a small canard foreplane, intended to give not only a safe stall but good Short takeoff and landing (STOL) performance. The foreplane allowed STOL performance to be achieved without the high angles of attack and accompanying dangers of stalling required by conventional STOL designs. The aircraft was evaluated by the US Army. Robertson's system was commercialised as the Wren 460, a modified Cessna light aircraft. This in turn was later licensed and produced during the 1980s as the Peterson 260SE and with the foreplane modification only as the 230SE. In 2006 a ruggedised variant, the Peterson Katmai, entered production. A broadly similar approach is taken by the 1988 Eagle-XTS and its derivatives, the Eagle 150 series.

=== Manoeuvrability beyond the stall ===
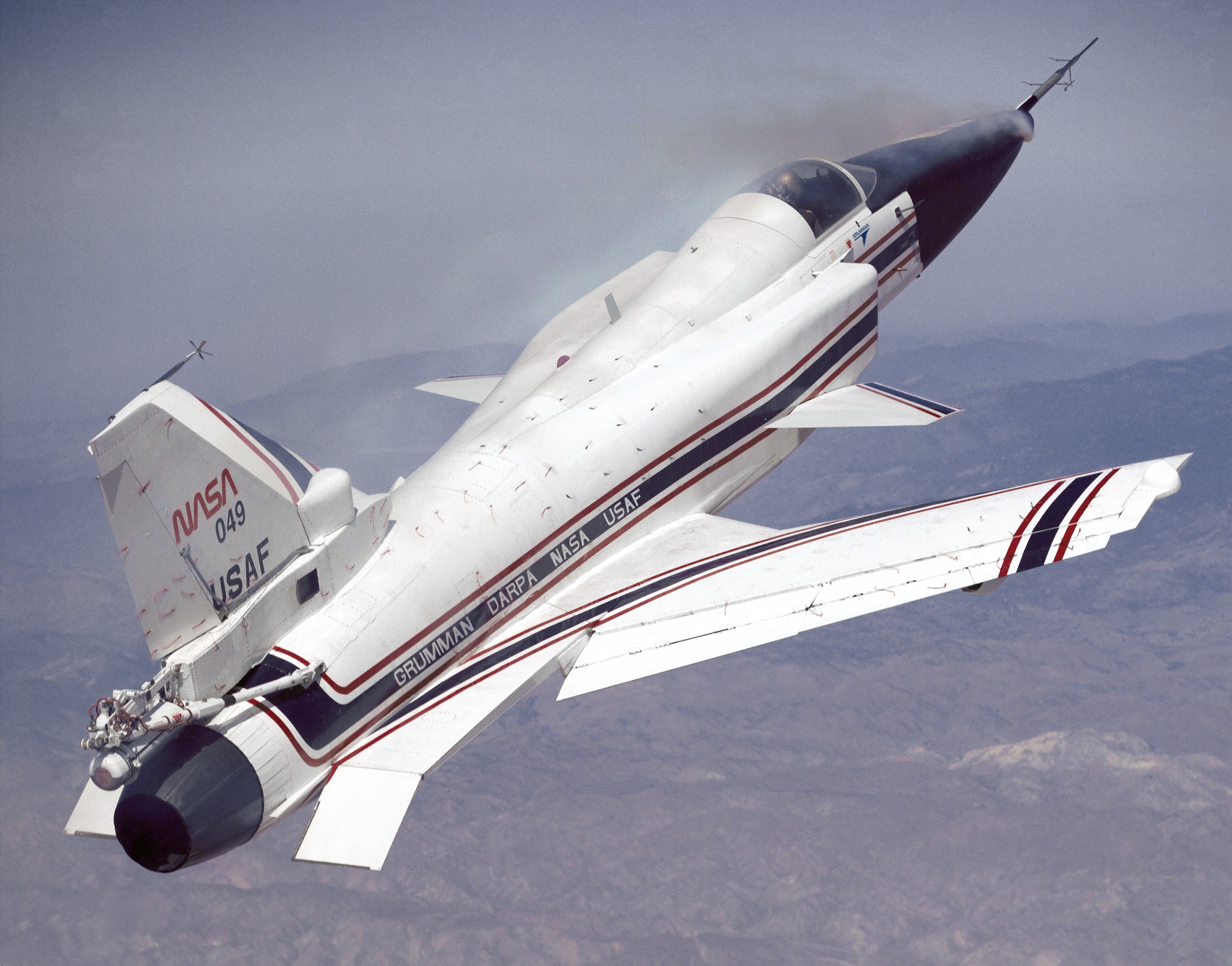
Grumman X-29, rear strake flaps deflected

Around 1979, military jet designers began studying three-surface configurations as a way to provide enhanced manoeuvrability and control, especially at low speeds and high angles of attack such as during takeoff and combat. In the United States the experimental Grumman X-29 flew in 1984 and a modified McDonnell Douglas F-15, the F-15 STOL/MTD, in 1988 but these designs were not followed up. In the Soviet Union a Sukhoi Su-27 modified with canard foreplanes flew in 1985 and derivatives of this design became the only military three-surface types to enter production.

=== Minimum wing surface ===
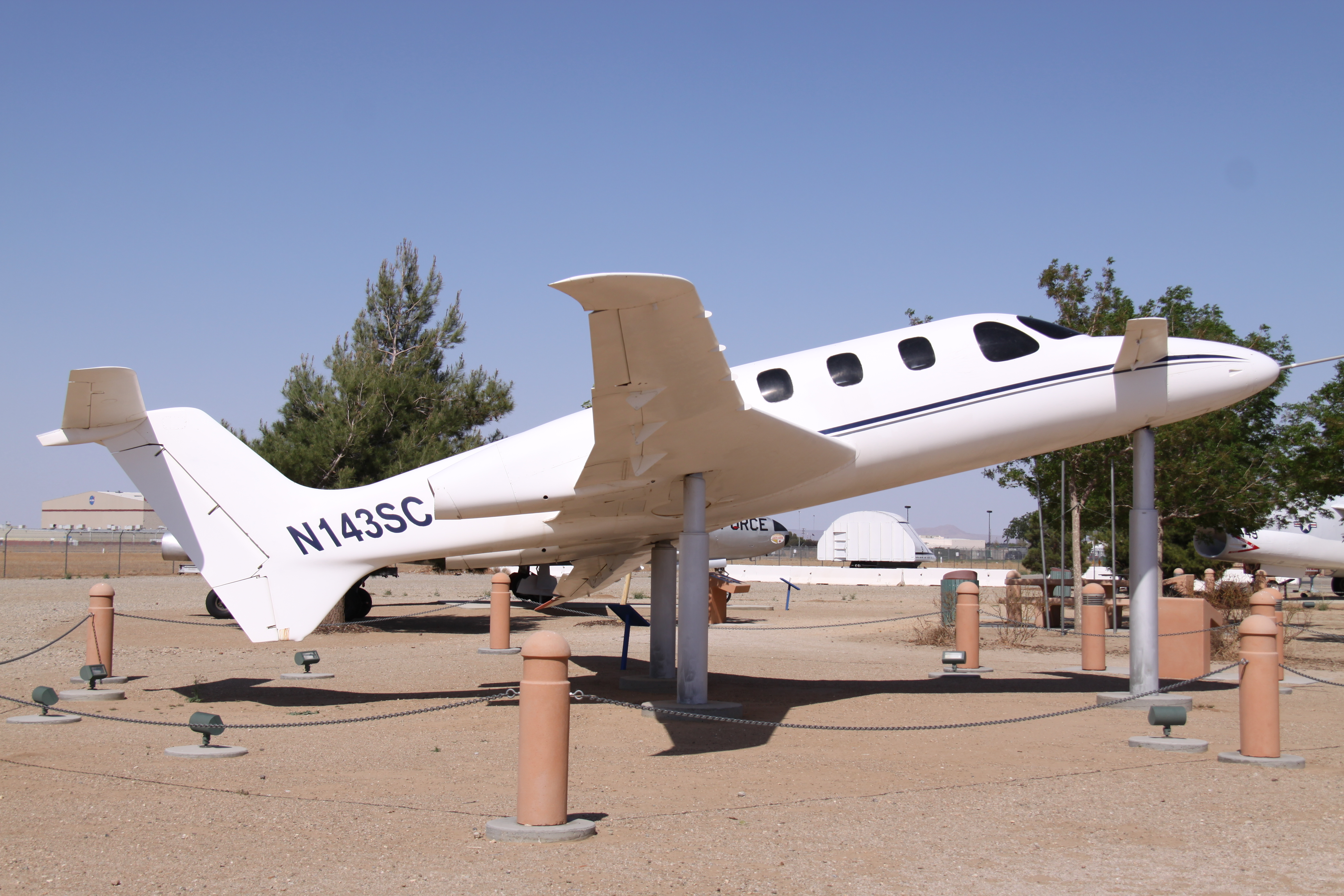
Scaled Composites Triumph

Also in 1979, Piaggio began design studies on a three-surface civil twin turboprop which, in collaboration with Learjet, would emerge as the Piaggio P.180 Avanti. This type first flew in 1986 and entered service in 1990, with production continuing today. In the Avanti, the three-surface configuration is claimed to significantly reduce wing size, weight and drag compared to the conventional equivalent.

Two experimental aircraft adopting this configuration were subsequently built by Scaled Composites under the lead of Burt Rutan and flown in 1988. The Triumph was a twin-turbofan very light jet aircraft designed for Beechcraft. Flight testing validated the targeted performance range. The Catbird was a single-engined propeller-driven aircraft, envisioned by Rutan as a replacement for the Beechcraft Bonanza. It holds the world record for speed over a closed circuit of 5,000 km (3,100 mi) without payload of 334.44 km/h (207.81 mph) set in 2014.

== Fighter aircraft design ==
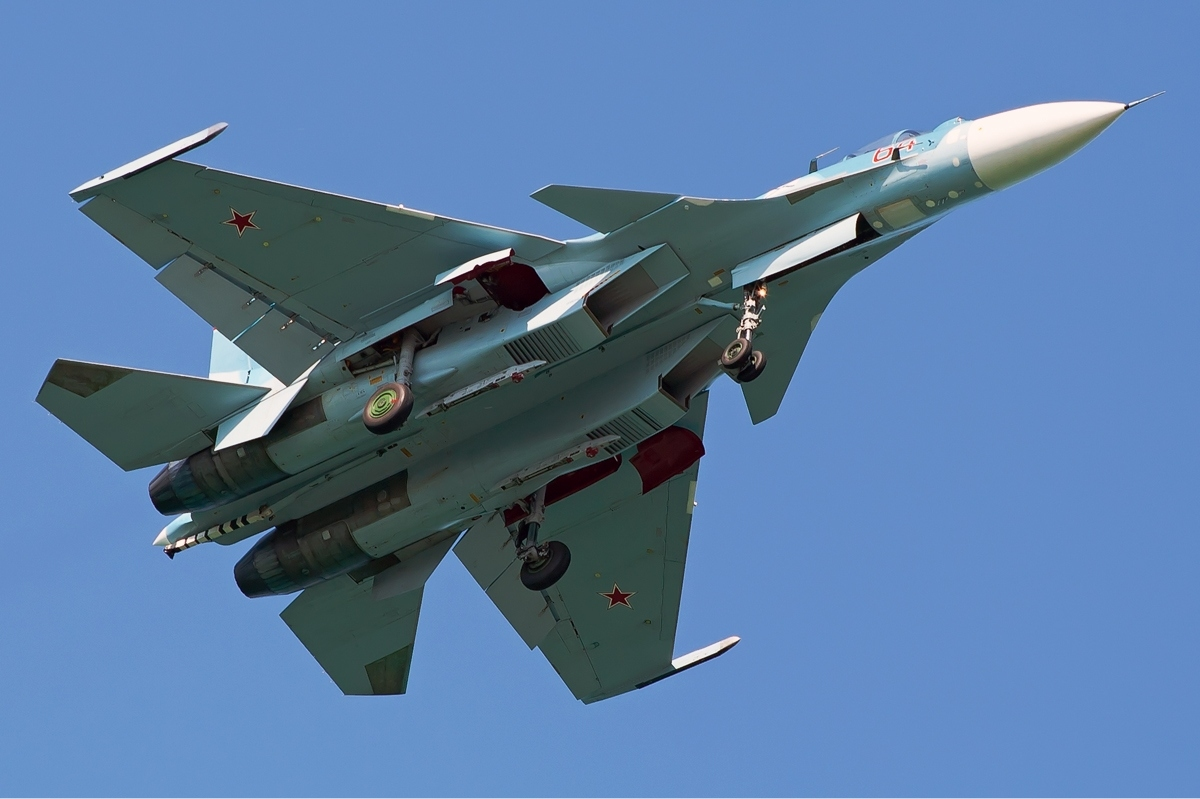
Sukhoi Su-33

Some advanced jet aircraft have a three-surface configuration, often in conjunction with thrust vectoring. This is typically intended to enhance control and manoeuvrability, especially at very high angles of attack beyond the stall point of the main wing. Some advanced combat manoeuvres such as Pugachev's Cobra and the Kulbit were first performed on Sukhoi three-surface aircraft.

The experimental Grumman X-29 was of basic "tail-first" canard configuration, with unusual forward-swept wings and strakes extending rearwards from the main wing roots. Movable flaps at the ends of the strakes effectively made it a three-surface design. The X-29 demonstrated exceptional high-angle of attack manoeuvrability.

A more straightforward three-surface design is seen in several variants of the otherwise conventional Sukhoi Su-27. Following the successful addition of canard foreplanes to a development aircraft, these were incorporated into a number of subsequent production variants including the naval Su-33 (Su-27K), some Su-30s, the Su-35 and the Su-37. The Chinese Shenyang J-15 also inherits the configuration of the Su-33.

The McDonnell Douglas F-15 STOL/MTD was an F-15 airframe modified with canard foreplanes and thrust vectoring, designed to demonstrate these technologies for both STOL performance and high manoeuvrability.

== Reduced surface area design ==
Equilibrium of a conventional (top) and a three-surface aircraft (bottom)

The three-surface configuration is claimed to reduce total aerodynamic surface area compared to the conventional and canard configurations, thus enabling drag and weight reductions.

=== Pitch equilibrium ===
On most aircraft, the wing centre of pressure moves forward and backward according to flight conditions. If it does not align with the centre of gravity, a corrective, or trim, force must be applied to prevent the aircraft pitching and thus to maintain equilibrium.

On a conventional aircraft this pitch trim force is applied by a tailplane. On many modern designs, the wing centre of pressure is normally aft of the centre of gravity, so the tailplane must exert a downward force. Any such negative lift generated by the tail must be compensated by additional lift from the main wing, thus increasing wing area, drag, and weight requirements.

On a three-surface aircraft, the pitch trim forces can be shared, as needed in flight, between the foreplane and tailplane. Equilibrium can be achieved with lift from the foreplane rather than downforce from the tailplane. Both effects, the reduced downforce and the extra lifting force, reduce the load on the main wing.

The Piaggio P.180 Avanti has flaps on both its forward wing and main wing. Both flaps deploy in concert to maintain pitch neutrality for take-off and landing.

=== Static stability and the stall ===
On a canard aircraft, to allow natural static pitch stability in normal flight, the foreplane must provide lift. Also, in order for the aircraft to have safe stall characteristics the foreplane must stall before the main wing, pitching the aircraft down and allowing the aircraft to recover. This means that a safety margin must be used on the main wing area so that its maximum lift coefficient and wing loading are never attained in practice. This in turn means that the main wing must be increased in size.

On a three-surface aircraft, the tailplane acts as a conventional horizontal stabiliser. In the stall condition, even if the main wing is stalled the tailplane can provide a pitch-down moment and allow recovery. The wing may thus be used up to its maximum lift coefficient, an advantage that may translate into a reduction of its area and weight.

A lifting foreplane is positioned ahead of the centre of gravity, so its lift moment acts in the same direction as any movement in pitch. If the aircraft is to be naturally stable, the foreplane's size, lift slope and moment arm must be chosen so that it does not overpower the stabilizing moment provided by the wing and tailplane. Stability constraints thus limit the foreplane's volume ratio (a measure of its effectiveness in trim and stability terms), which may in turn limit its ability to share pitch trim forces as described above.

=== Wing area reduction ===
The minimum size of the lifting wings of an aircraft is determined by: the weight of the aircraft, the force required to oppose the negative lift produced by the horizontal stabilizer, the targeted take off and landing speeds, and the coefficient of lift of the wings.

Most modern aircraft use trailing edge flaps on the main wing to increase the wings lift coefficient during takeoff and landing; thus allowing the wing to be smaller than it would otherwise need to be. This may reduce the weight of the wing, and it always reduces the surface area of the wing. The reduction of surface area proportionately reduces skin drag at all speeds.

A drawback of the use of trailing edge flaps is that they produce significant negative pitching moment when in use. In order to balance this pitching moment the horizontal stabilizer must be somewhat larger than it would otherwise be, so that it can produce enough force to balance the negative pitching moment created by the trailing edge flaps. This, in turn, means that the main wing must be somewhat larger than it would otherwise have to be to balance the larger negative lift produced by the larger horizontal stabilizer.

On a canard aircraft the foreplane can provide positive lift at takeoff, reducing some of the down force the rear stabilizer would otherwise have to create. However, the main wing must be large enough to not only lift the aircraft's remaining weight at takeoff but also to provide adequate safety margin to prevent stalling. On a three-surface aircraft, neither of these handicaps is present and the main wing can be reduced in size, so also reducing weight and drag. It is claimed that the total area of all wing surfaces of a three-surface aircraft can be less than that of the equivalent two-surface aircraft, so reducing both weight and drag.

Minimum area in cruise can be further reduced through the use of conventional high-lift devices such as flaps, allowing a three-surface design to have minimum surface area at all points in the flight envelope.

Examples of reduced-area three-surface aircraft include the Piaggio P.180 Avanti, and the Scaled Composites Triumph and Catbird. These aircraft were designed to expose a minimum of total surface area to the slipstream; thus reducing surface drag for speed and fuel efficiency. Several reviews compare the Avanti's top speed and service ceiling to that of lower-end jet aircraft, and report significantly better fuel efficiency at cruise speed. Piaggio attributes this performance in part to the layout of the aircraft, claiming a 34% reduction in total wing area compared to a conventional layout.

== List of three-surface aircraft ==
Type	Country	Class	Role	Date	Status	No.	Notes
Aceair AERIKS 200	Switzerland	Propeller	Private	2002	Prototype		Designed as a home build kit.
Curtiss/AEA June Bug	US	Propeller	Experimental	1908	Prototype		
Caproni Ca.60 Noviplano	Italy	Propeller	Transport	1921	Prototype		Three triplane stacks, making nine wings in all. Flying boat.
Curtiss No. 1	US	Propeller	Experimental	1909	Prototype		Also known as the Curtiss Gold Bug or Curtiss Golden Flyer.
de la Farge Pulga	Argentina	Propeller	Private	1990 (circa)			Modified Flying Flea
Dufaux	Switzerland	Propeller	Experimental	1908	Prototype		First Swiss aircraft to fly.
Eagle-XTS	Australia	Propeller	Private	1988			
Eagle Aircraft Eagle 150	Australia	Propeller	Private	1997			
Farman three wing monoplane	France	Propeller	Experimental	1908	Prototype		
Fernic T-9	US	Propeller	Private	1929			
Fernic-Cruisaire FT-10	US	Propeller	Private	1930			
Fokker V.8	Germany	Propeller	Experimental	1917	Prototype		
Grumman X-29	US	Jet	Experimental	1984	Prototype		Forward-swept wing with canard foreplane and tailboom flaps.
Herring–Burgess	US	Propeller		1910			Biplane.
Kress Drachenflieger	Austria-Hungary	Propeller	Experimental	1901	Prototype		Failed to fly: engine lacked sufficient power to take off.
McDonnell Douglas F-15 STOL/MTD	US	Jet	Experimental	1988	Prototype		technology demonstrator of enhanced maneuverability including use of thrust vectoring
Mikoyan-Gurevich Ye-8	Soviet Union	Jet	Experimental	1962	Prototype		
Miller-Bohannon JM-2 Pushy Galore	US	Propeller	Private	1989	Operational	1	Racer in pusher configuration
NPO Molniya 1	Russia		Transport	1992			
Peterson 260SE and 230SE	US	Propeller	Private	1986			
Peterson Katmai	US	Propeller	Private				
Piaggio P.180 Avanti	Italy	Propeller	Transport	1986	Production		
Robertson Skyshark	US	Propeller	Private				
Rutan Scaled Model 120 'Predator'	US	Propeller	Experimental	1984	Prototype		
Scaled Composites ATTT (model 133)	US	Propeller	Experimental	1987	Prototype		
Scaled Composites Triumph (model 143)	US	Jet	Experimental	1988	Prototype		
Scaled Composites Catbird (model 181)	US	Propeller	Experimental	1988	Prototype		
Shenyang J-15	China	Jet	High-manoeuvrability combat	2009			
Short No.1 biplane	UK	Propeller	Experimental	1910	Prototype		Not flown.
Sukhoi Su-27M	Soviet Union	Jet	High-manoeuvrability combat				Some examples fitted with a foreplane in addition to the standard tailplane.
Sukhoi Su-30 MKI	India	Jet	Fighter	1989	Production		License-built variant of the Sukhoi Su-30
Sukhoi Su-33	Soviet Union	Jet	Fighter	1987	Production		
Sukhoi Su-34	Russia	Jet	Attack	1990	Production		
Sukhoi Su-37	Russia	Jet	Fighter	1996	Prototype		
Sukhoi Su-47	Russia	Jet	Experimental	1997	Prototype		Main wing is forward-swept.
Voisin–Farman I	France	Propeller	Experimental	1907			
Wren 460	US	Propeller	Private	1963			
Wright Model A (Modified)	US	Propeller	Experimental	1909			

== See also ==
- Index of aviation articles
- Canard (aeronautics)
- Tailplane
- Tandem wing
- Wing configuration
