= Muniz Casmuniz 52 =

Twin-engine light transport aircraft

Casmuniz 52

General information
- Type: Light transport
- National origin: Brazil
- Manufacturer: Cassio Muniz SA / OMAREAL (Officina de Manutenção e Recuperação de Aviões, Ltda.)
- Designer: Willibald Weber
- Status: Lost while flying over the Amazon jungle, 1968
- Number built: 1

History
- Introduction date: 1953
- First flight: April 1952
- Developed from: Aero 45

The Casmuniz 52 was a twin-engine light transport aircraft. It was the first all-metal aircraft built in Brazil, only the prototype was built.

== Design and development ==
The plane began to be designed by Willibald Weber in 1951, an Austrian pilot and aeronautical engineer born in Wiener Neustadt in 1925, and where work for Messerschmitt until 1944. In 1949, he moved to Brazil, and worked for Cássio Muniz S/A. His design was based on the Aero 45, which he had already maintained and designed a five-seat twin-engined cabin monoplane which was first flown in April 1952. A low-wing cantilever monoplane with a 185 hp (138 kW) Continental E185 flat six engines mounted on the leading edge of wing. It had a tailwheel landing gear.

== Operational history ==
It was registered with the prefix “PP-ZPD” and taken for airworthiness tests at Campo de Marte, which lasted from the late-1953 to the beginning of 1954. After accumulating 200 flight hours, the aircraft was sent to the Department of Aerospace Science and Technology, where it received its certification in 1955.

The company offered Cessna the proposal of creating an assembly line for its aircraft in Brazil, so that they could also produce the Casmuniz 52 in series, the proposal was refused because the American company was already negotiating a factory in Argentina. After, the airplane was sold to Weber that left the company to found the OMAREL, where he made modifications and used the airplane intensively from 1957 until 1958. With the end of his company's activities, the airplane passed by several owners.

In 1960, the plane was sold to a air charter company, and change the prefix to “PT-AZU”. Operating in the northern and northeastern region of Brazil, where it accumulated several hours of flights, and transported all kinds of cargo, until it crashed in 1968 in São Marcos Bay, near São Luís, Maranhão.

== Specifications (Casmuniz 52) ==
Data from Jane's All The World's Aircraft 1956–57

General characteristics

- Crew: 1
- Capacity: 4 passengers
- Length: 8.0 m (26 ft 3 in)
- Wingspan: 13.3 m (43 ft 8 in)
- Height: 3.5 m (11 ft 6 in)
- Wing area: 19.26 m^{2} (207.3 sq ft)
- Aspect ratio: 9.18:1
- Empty weight: 1,280 kg (2,822 lb)
- Gross weight: 1,750 kg (3,858 lb)
- Fuel capacity: 160 L (42 US gal; 35 imp gal)
- Powerplant: 2 × Continental E185-11 air-cooled flat-six engines, 138 kW (185 hp) each
- Propellers: 2-bladed Hartzell HC12 x 20-7c two-pitch propellers

Performance

- Maximum speed: 314 km/h (195 mph, 170 kn)
- Cruise speed: 282 km/h (175 mph, 152 kn) (max cruise)
- Stall speed: 97 km/h (60 mph, 52 kn)
- Range: 1,200 km (750 mi, 650 nmi)
- Service ceiling: 6,100 m (20,000 ft)
- Rate of climb: 7.6 m/s (1,500 ft/min)
