= Scaled Composites Triumph =

1988 business jet prototype

Coordinates: 34.602989°N 118.088706°W

Triumph
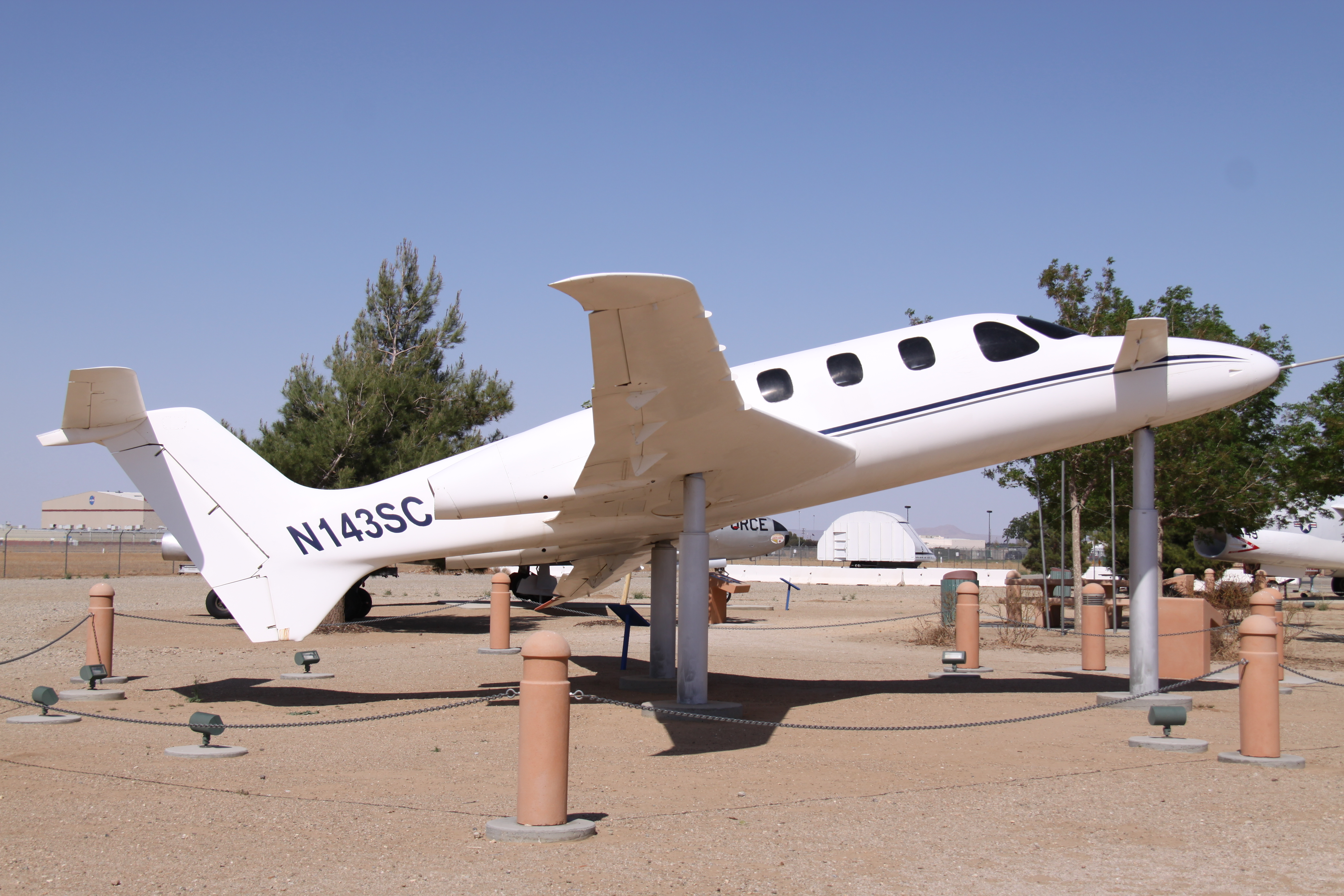

General information
- Type: Very Light Jet demonstrator
- National origin: United States of America
- Manufacturer: Scaled Composites
- Designer: Burt Rutan
- Number built: 1
- Registration: N143SC

History
- First flight: July 12, 1988

The Scaled Composites Triumph is a twin-engine, business jet prototype designed and built by Burt Rutan's Scaled Composites for Beechcraft. It was known officially as the Model 143, and internally at Scaled as the "Tuna". The aircraft is a three lifting surface design, with both a small canard, and a small conventional horizontal stabilizer in a T-tail configuration.

== Design and development ==
Originally, three versions of the all-composite aircraft were envisioned, one powered by piston engines, one by turboprops and one by turbofans. The only one built was the turbofan version with engines mounted on top of the wings, which was first aircraft to be powered by the Williams International FJ44 engine. The maiden flight took place at the Mojave Airport on July 12, 1988.

The flight test program was completed and confirmed the targeted performance. The financial situation of Beech at the time, and competing projects, prevented consideration of commercial production. In February 1991, Rutan stated, "it had the potential for enormous improvements in efficiency compared to the King Air. It was as fast as the Citation II, but had 60% better fuel economy." After the test program was completed, the airframe was mounted on a pedestal at Scaled's Mojave facility for several years. The Triumph is currently on display in the Joe Davies Heritage Airpark at Palmdale Plant 42.

== Specifications ==
Data from Jane's All The World's Aircraft 1990–91

General characteristics

- Length: 39 ft 0 in (11.89 m)
- Wingspan: 48 ft 0 in (14.63 m)
- Height: 10 ft 11 in (3.32 m)
- Wing area: 199.0 sq ft (18.49 m^{2})
- Aspect ratio: 11.55:1
- Empty weight: 5,000 lb (2,268 kg)
- Max takeoff weight: 9,000 lb (4,082 kg)
- Powerplant: 2 × Williams FJ44 turbofans, 1,800 lbf (8.0 kN) thrust each

Performance

- Maximum speed: 460 mph (740 km/h, 400 kn) at 35,000 ft (11,000 m)
- Cruise speed: 390 mph (630 km/h, 340 kn)
- Stall speed: 86 mph (139 km/h, 75 kn) (power off)
- Range: 1,800 mi (3,000 km, 1,600 nmi)
- Service ceiling: 41,000 ft (12,000 m)
- Rate of climb: 4,500 ft/min (23 m/s)

== See also ==
Related lists

- List of civil aircraft
