= NPO Molniya Molniya-1 =

Molniya-1
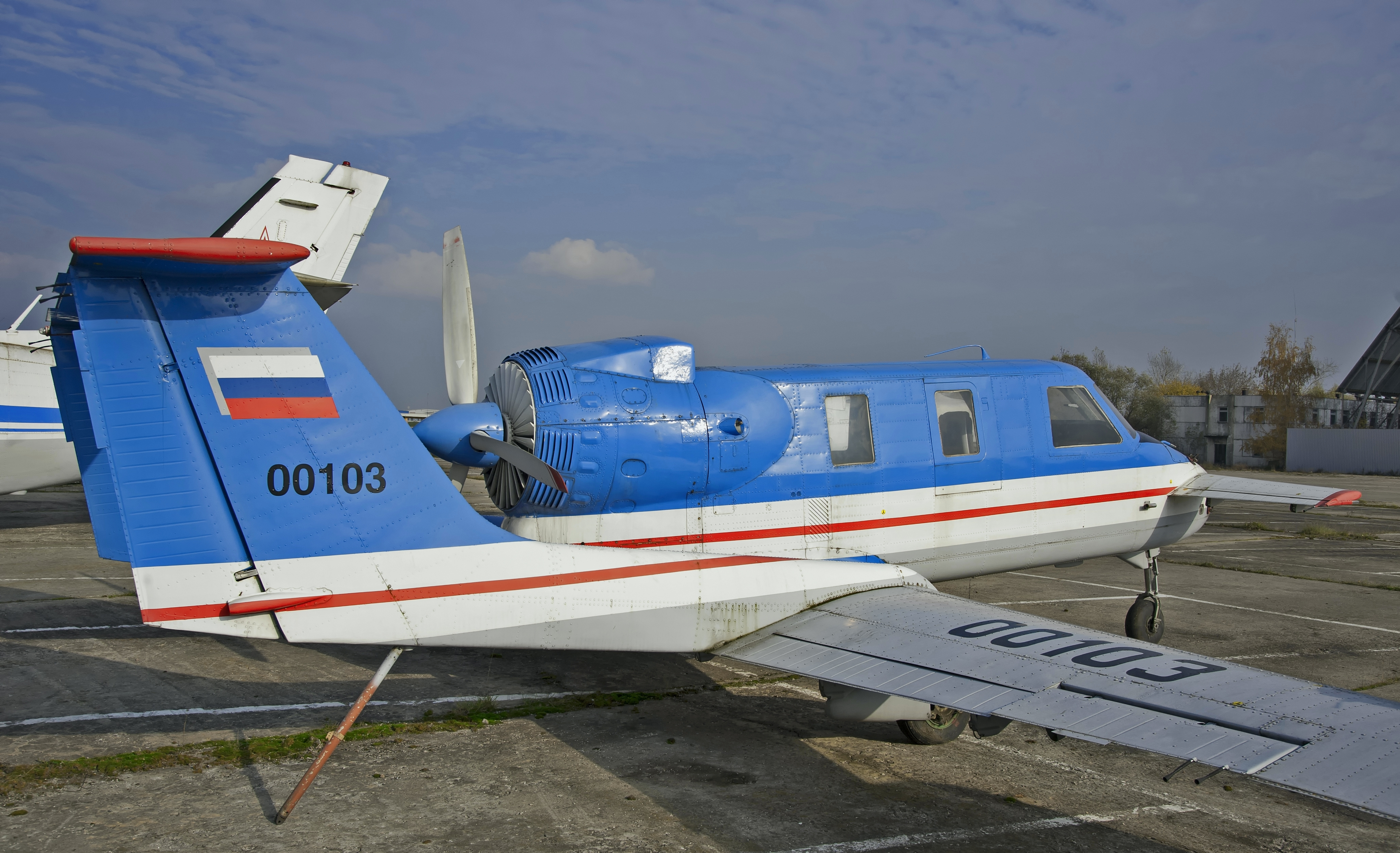

General information
- Type: Three surface utility aircraft
- National origin: Russia
- Manufacturer: NPO Molniya
- Number built: 2 by 2000

History
- First flight: 18 December 1992

The Molniya-1 is a six-seater utility aircraft designed and built in Russia during the 1990s.

== Design and development ==
The Molniya-1 six-seat aircraft is a three surface design with a forward balanced canard surface and a square section fuselage with a Vedeneyev M14P nine cylinder radial engine in the rear. Twin booms carry fins with balanced and trim tabbed rudders and a high set tailplane, similarly tabbed and balanced.

It was intended to cover a wide range of tasks including touring, cargo/mail carrying, business flights, aerial photography, patrol and air ambulance services. The three-surface configuration was intended to provide improved safety and fuel efficiency over conventional types, with the rear-mounted engine lowering cabin noise and vibration. It flew for the first time on 18 December 1992.

A Westernised version with a 260 kW (350 hp) Continental TSIO-550-B flat six engine and another, the Moliniya-3 with an Allison 250 turboprop, were proposed. More broadly, the company were considering a number of larger types based on the three surface configuration.

== Operational history ==
In 1993 the design received a gold medal at the Eureka-93 World Inventors, Scientific Research and Know-How Salon in Brussels. It was demonstrated at the Le Bourget aero show in 1995. Only two Moliniyas had been built by about 2000.

== Specifications (Molniya-1) ==
Data from Simpson 2001

General characteristics

- Crew: 1
- Capacity: 5 passenger / 500 kg (1,100 lb) maximum payload
- Length: 7.87 m (25 ft 10 in)
- Wingspan: 8.51 m (27 ft 11 in)
- Height: 2.31 m (7 ft 7 in)
- Gross weight: 1,740 kg (3,836 lb)
- Powerplant: 1 × Vedeneyev M14PM-1 9-cylinder, four-stroke, air-cooled radial piston engine, 270 kW (360 hp)

Performance

- Maximum speed: 322 km/h (200 mph, 174 kn)
- Cruise speed: 290 km/h (180 mph, 160 kn)
- Stall speed: 115 km/h (71 mph, 62 kn)
- Range: 500 km (310 mi, 270 nmi) with maximum payload
- Rate of climb: 3.8 m/s (750 ft/min) at sea level
