= Robertson Skylark SRX-1 =

American STOL aircraft

General information
- Type: STOL aircraft
- National origin: United States of America
- Manufacturer: Robertson Development Corp
- Designer: James Robertson

History
- First flight: 1955

The Robertson Skylark SRX-1 is a five place high performance STOL aircraft designed in the 1950s. It was intended to be operated out of 120 ft (37 m) landing strips with 150 mph (241 km/h) cruise speeds.

== Design ==
The aircraft was designed by James L. Robertson, son of William B. Robertson, Robertson Aircraft Corporation founder at the age of 27. The aircraft is designed to be stall-proof and spin-proof and is capable of a 25 mph (40 km/h) minimum flight speed. It was also the first light aircraft in America to be designed to accommodate a turboprop engine.

The Skylark is all metal, with a steel tube internal structure. It incorporates shrouds, flaps, spoilerons, turbulator control, stabilators, elevators, and spinner duct cooling.

== Operational history ==
Test flights were performed by aerobatic pilot Marion Cole. He featured the aircraft as part of his Cole Brothers airshows. The aircraft is able to take off in 100 feet.

== Specifications (Robertson Skylark SRX-1) ==
Data from Experimenter

General characteristics

- Crew: 1
- Capacity: 4 passengers
- Length: 30 ft 6 in (9.30 m)
- Wingspan: 40 ft (12 m)
- Height: 7 ft 10 in (2.39 m)
- Empty weight: 2,250 lb (1,021 kg)
- Gross weight: 3,500 lb (1,588 kg)
- Powerplant: 1 × Continental GE260-2X , 260 hp (190 kW)
- Propellers: 2-bladed Hartzell HC-12x20-8C

Performance

- Maximum speed: 143 kn (165 mph, 266 km/h)
