= Continental O-470 =

6-cylinder air-cooled aircraft engine

O-470
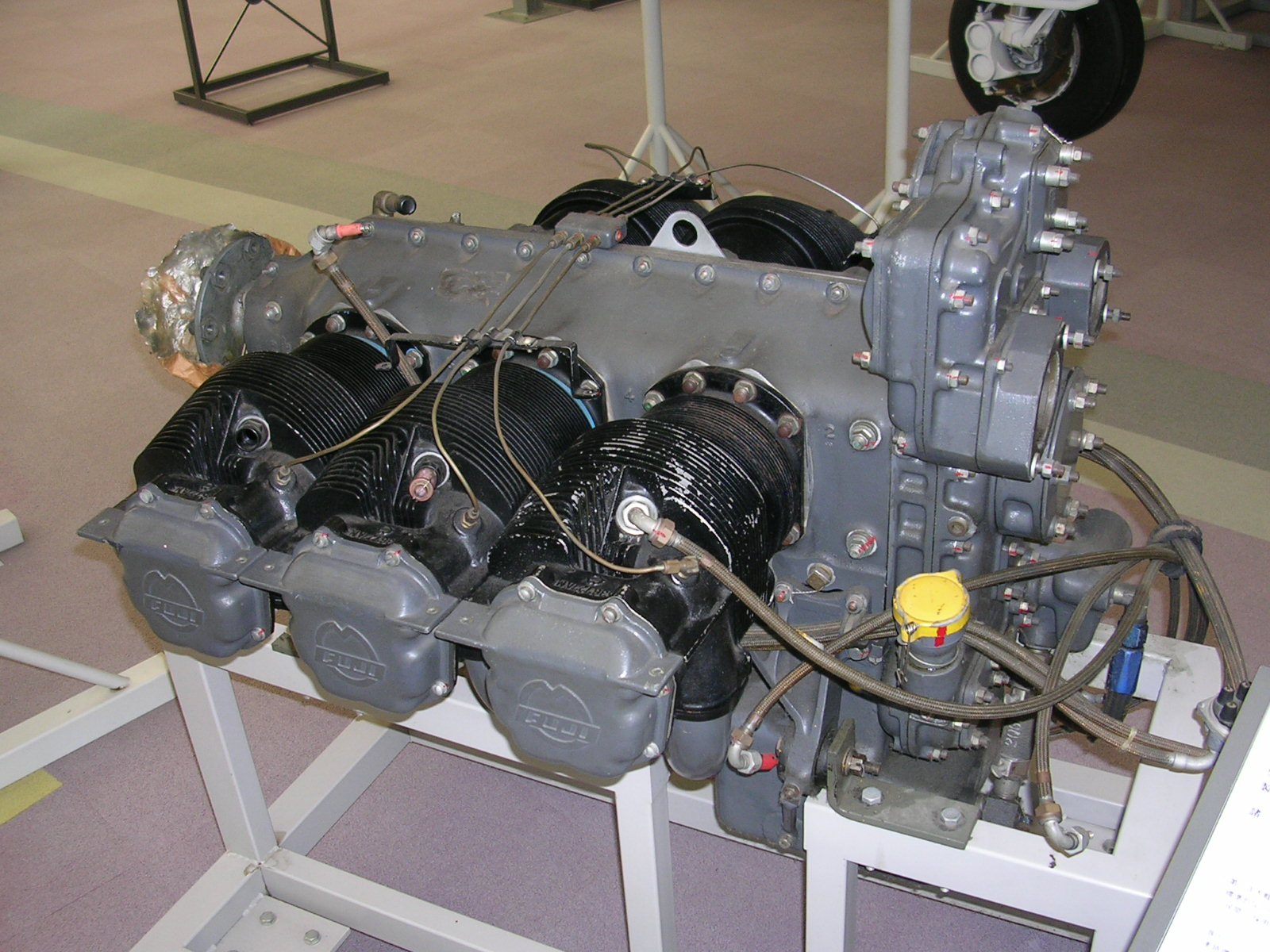
- Preserved Continental O-470-11 on display at the Tokorozawa Aviation Museum
- Type: Piston aero-engine
- National origin: United States
- Manufacturer: Teledyne Continental Motors
- First run: 1950
- Major applications: Beechcraft Bonanza; Beechcraft Baron; Cessna Bird Dog; Cessna 180; Cessna 182; Cessna 185; Cessna 188; Cessna 210; Cessna 310
- Manufactured: 1953–1986

The Continental O-470 engine is a family of carbureted and fuel-injected six-cylinder, horizontally opposed, air-cooled aircraft engines that were developed especially for use in light aircraft by Continental Motors. Engines designated "IO" are fuel-injected.

The family also includes the E165, E185, E225 and the E260 engines, and several specialty variants. It has been in production since 1950.

== Design and development ==
The first engine in this series was the E165, a 471 cubic inch (7.7 L) engine producing 165 hp (123 kW), and was the first of the Continental's "E" series engines. Later versions were given the company designation of E185 (185 hp (138 kW) continuous) and E225 (225 hp (168 kW)). When the US military gave them all the designation of O-470 the company adopted the designation and future models were known as Continental O-470s.

The O-470 family of engines covers a range from 213 hp (159 kW) to 260 hp (194 kW). The engines were developed in the late 1940s and certification was applied for on 23 October 1950 on the regulatory basis of Part 13 of the US Civil Air Regulations effective 1 August 1949 as amended by 13-1. The first O-470 model was certified on 19 January 1951.

== Variants ==
=== Carbureted models ===
E165-2
165 hp (123 kW) at 2050 rpm, dry weight 351 lb (159 kg), Marvel-Schebler MA-4-5 carburetor.
E165-3
165 hp (123 kW) at 2050 rpm, dry weight 352 lb (160 kg), Bendix-Stromberg PS-5C or PS-5CD carburetor.
E165-4
165 hp (123 kW) at 2050 rpm, dry weight 344 lb (156 kg), Bendix-Stromberg PS-5C or PS-5CD carburetor.
E185-1
205 hp (153 kW) at 2600 rpm for five minutes, 185 hp (138 kW) at 2300 rpm continuous, dry weight 344 lb (156 kg), Bendix-Stromberg PS-5C or PS-5CD carburetor.
E185-2
185 hp (138 kW) at 2300 rpm, dry weight 351 lb (159 kg), Marvel-Schebler MA-4-5 carburetor.
E185-3
205 hp (153 kW) at 2600 rpm for five minutes, 185 hp (138 kW) at 2300 rpm continuous, dry weight 352 lb (160 kg), Bendix-Stromberg PS-5C or PS-5CD carburetor.
E185-5
185 hp (138 kW) at 2300 rpm, dry weight 343 lb (156 kg), Bendix-Stromberg PS-5C or PS-5CD carburetor.
E185-8
205 hp (153 kW) at 2600 rpm for five minutes, 185 hp (138 kW) at 2300 rpm continuous, dry weight 344 lb (156 kg), Bendix-Stromberg PS-5C or PS-5CD carburetor, identical to E185-1 but with revised starter drive with dog rather than gear type starter.
E185-9
205 hp (153 kW) at 2600 rpm for five minutes, 185 hp (138 kW) at 2300 rpm continuous, dry weight 352 lb (160 kg), Bendix-Stromberg PS-5C or PS-5CD carburetor, identical to E185-3 except for revised starter drive to accommodate dog rather than gear type starter.
E185-10
205 hp (153 kW) at 2600 rpm for five minutes, 185 hp (138 kW) at 2300 rpm continuous, dry weight 352 lb (160 kg), Bendix-Stromberg PS-5C or PS-5CD carburetor.
E185-11
205 hp (153 kW) at 2600 rpm for five minutes, 185 hp (138 kW) at 2300 rpm continuous, dry weight 344 lb (156 kg), Bendix-Stromberg PS-5C or PS-5CD carburetor, identical to E185-8 but with revised mounting brackets.
E225-2
225 hp (168 kW) at 2650 rpm, dry weight 359 lb (163 kg). Certified 19 July 1951.
E225-4
225 hp (168 kW) at 2650 rpm, dry weight 355 lb (161 kg). Certified 5 July 1952.
E225-8
225 hp (168 kW) at 2650 rpm, dry weight 347 lb (157 kg). Certified 12 July 1950.
E225-9
225 hp (168 kW) at 2650 rpm, dry weight 363 lb (165 kg). Certified 30 October 1950.
GE260-2X
260 hp (194 kW), flown in the Robertson Skylark SRX-1
O-470-2
250 hp (186 kW) at 2600 rpm, dry weight 484 lb (220 kg), supercharged model. Certified 2 February 1955.
O-470-4
225 hp (168 kW) at 2600 rpm, dry weight 415 lb (188 kg), previously designated 0-470-13B. It is identical to the Model 0-470-13A except for the Bendix-Stromberg Model PS-5CD carburetor in place of the PS-5C. Certified 19 January 1951.
O-470-7
Non-certified military engine, identical to E185-3, 205 hp (153 kW) at 2600 rpm, dry weight 352 lb (160 kg), Bendix-Stromberg PS-5C or PS-5CD carburetor. When equipped with 18 mm. spark plugs, it is designated 0-470-7A.
O-470-11
213 hp (159 kW) at 2600 rpm, dry weight 391 lb (177 kg), two sixth order dampers. Certified 19 January 1951.
O-470-11B
213 hp (159 kW) at 2600 rpm, dry weight 391 lb (177 kg), identical to the 0-470-11 but with 0-470-15 cylinders and pistons. Certified 19 January 1951.
O-470-13
225 hp (168 kW) at 2600 rpm, dry weight 415 lb (188 kg), one fifth and one sixth order dampers or two sixth order dampers. Certified 19 January 1951.
O-470-13A
225 hp (168 kW) at 2600 rpm, dry weight 415 lb (188 kg), identical to the 0-470-13 but with an additional tachometer drive through the camshaft gear and one fifth and one sixth order crankshaft damper. Certified 19 January 1951.
O-470-15
213 hp (159 kW) at 2600 rpm, dry weight 405 lb (184 kg), identical to the 0-470-11 except: four sixth order damper crankshaft, propeller control provisions, revised engine mounting brackets and long skirt pistons. Certified 19 January 1951.
O-470-A
225 hp (168 kW) at 2600 rpm, dry weight 378 lb (171 kg). Certified 4 December 1952.
O-470-B
240 hp (179 kW) at 2600 rpm, dry weight 410 lb (186 kg), similar to O-470-A except increased power, different damper configuration, incorporation of inclined valve cylinders, downdraft pressure carburetor and induction changes. Identical to E185-9. Certified 4 December 1952.
O-470-E
225 hp (168 kW) at 2600 rpm, dry weight 390 lb (177 kg), same as O-470-A except downdraft pressure carburetor. Certified 4 December 1952.
O-470-G
240 hp (179 kW) at 2600 rpm, dry weight 432 lb (196 kg), similar to O-470-M except crankshaft damper configuration, revised oil sump integral cast intake air passage and mounting brackets. Certified 4 December 1952.
O-470-H
240 hp (179 kW) at 2600 rpm, dry weight 495 lb (225 kg), same as O-470-B with an extension propeller shaft, approved for pusher installations. Certified 4 December 1952.
O-470-J
225 hp (168 kW) at 2550 rpm, dry weight 378 lb (171 kg), same as O-470-A except reduced max rpm and induction system risers, manifold and balance tube. Certified 4 December 1952.
O-470-K
230 hp (172 kW) at 2600 rpm, dry weight 404 lb (183 kg), similar to O-470-J except max rpm, crankshaft damper configuration, incorporation of shell-molded cylinder heads and revised mounting brackets. Certified 4 December 1952.
O-470-L
230 hp (172 kW) at 2600 rpm, dry weight 404 lb (183 kg), same as O-470-K except relocated carburetor, revised intake manifold oil sump. Certified 4 December 1952.
O-470-M
240 hp (179 kW) at 2600 rpm, dry weight 410 lb (186 kg), same as O-470-B except crankshaft damper configuration and incorporation of shell-molded cylinder heads. Certified 4 December 1952.
O-470-N
240 hp (179 kW) at 2600 rpm, dry weight 410 lb (186 kg), same as O-470-M except crankshaft damper configuration. Certified 4 December 1952.
O-470-P
240 hp (179 kW) at 2600 rpm, dry weight 432 lb (196 kg), identical to O-470-G except crankshaft damper configuration. Certified 4 December 1952.
O-470-R
230 hp (172 kW) at 2600 rpm, dry weight 401 lb (182 kg), same as O-470-L except crankshaft damper configuration. Certified 4 December 1952.
O-470-S
230 hp (172 kW) at 2600 rpm, dry weight 401 lb (182 kg), same as O-470-R except piston oil cooling and semi-keystone piston rings. Certified 4 December 1952.
O-470-T
230 hp (172 kW) at 2400 rpm, dry weight 410 lb (186 kg), similar to the O-470-S except crankcase design and max rpm. Certified 4 December 1952.
O-470-U
230 hp (172 kW) at 2400 rpm, dry weight 412 lb (187 kg), similar to the O-470-S except max rpm rating and crankshaft damper configuration. Certified 4 December 1952.

=== Fuel-injected models ===
IO-470-A
240 hp (179 kW) at 2600 rpm, dry weight 432 lb (196 kg), equipped with a TCM 5580 fuel injector. Certified 4 December 1952.
IO-470-C
250 hp (186 kW) at 2600 rpm, dry weight 410 lb (186 kg), equipped with a TCM 5620 or 5827 fuel injector. Certified 4 December 1952.
IO-470-D
260 hp (194 kW) at 2625 rpm, dry weight 426 lb (193 kg), equipped with a TCM 5648, 5808 or 5832 fuel injector. Certified 14 October 1958.
IO-470-E
260 hp (194 kW) at 2625 rpm, dry weight 429 lb (195 kg), equipped with a TCM 5648, 5808 or 5832 fuel injector. Certified 26 November 1958.
IO-470-F
260 hp (194 kW) at 2625 rpm, dry weight 426 lb (193 kg), equipped with a TCM 5648, 5808 or 5832 fuel injector. Certified 3 December 1958.
IO-470-G
250 hp (186 kW) at 2600 rpm, dry weight 431 lb (195 kg), equipped with a TCM 5648, 5808 or 5832 fuel injector. Certified 30 March 1959.
IO-470-H
260 hp (194 kW) at 2625 rpm, dry weight 432 lb (196 kg), equipped with a TCM 5620-2 fuel injector. Certified 7 August 1959.
IO-470-J
225 hp (168 kW) at 2600 rpm, dry weight 400 lb (181 kg), equipped with a TCM 5612-1 fuel injector. Certified 31 July 1959.
IO-470-K
225 hp (168 kW) at 2600 rpm, dry weight 400 lb (181 kg), equipped with a TCM 5807 fuel injector. Certified 9 June 1960.
IO-470-L
260 hp (194 kW) at 2625 rpm, dry weight 429 lb (195 kg), equipped with a TCM 5648, 5808 or 5832 fuel injector. Certified 9 March 1960.
IO-470-LO
260 hp (194 kW) at 2625 rpm, dry weight 429 lb (195 kg), equipped with a TCM 5648, 5808 or 5832 fuel injector. Certified 26 September 1967.
IO-470-M
260 hp (194 kW) at 2625 rpm, dry weight 428 lb (194 kg), equipped with a TCM 5648, 5808 or 5832 fuel injector. Certified 10 March 1960.
IO-470-N
260 hp (194 kW) at 2625 rpm, dry weight 432 lb (196 kg), equipped with a TCM 5830 fuel injector. Certified 9 June 1960.
IO-470-P
250 hp (186 kW) at 2600 rpm, dry weight 472 lb (214 kg), equipped with a TCM 5648 fuel injector. Certified 31 March 1961.
IO-470-R
250 hp (186 kW) at 2600 rpm, dry weight 431 lb (195 kg), equipped with a TCM 5648, 5808 or 5832 fuel injector. Certified 7 October 1960.
IO-470-S
260 hp (194 kW) at 2625 rpm, dry weight 429 lb (195 kg), equipped with a TCM 5648, 5808 or 5832 fuel injector. Certified 10 May 1961.
IO-470-T
250 hp (186 kW) at 2600 rpm, dry weight 475 lb (215 kg), equipped with a TCM 5648 fuel injector. Certified 1 July 1963.
IO-470-U
260 hp (194 kW) at 2625 rpm, dry weight 426 lb (193 kg), equipped with a TCM 5648, 5808 or 5832 fuel injector. Certified 28 August 1963.
IO-470-V
260 hp (194 kW) at 2625 rpm, dry weight 426 lb (193 kg), equipped with a TCM 5648, 5808 or 5832 fuel injector. Certified 15 June 1965.
IO-470-VO
260 hp (194 kW) at 2625 rpm, dry weight 426 lb (193 kg), equipped with a TCM 5648, 5808 or 5832 fuel injector. Identical to a V but with an oil spray onto piston bottom for enhanced cooling. Certified 26 September 1967.
GIO-470-A
TSIO-470-B
LIO-470-A
250 hp (186 kW) at 2600 rpm, dry weight 475 lb (215 kg), equipped with a TCM 6022 fuel injector. The same as an IO-470-T, except that the crankshaft turns in opposite direction for use on twin-engined aircraft. Certified 18 March 1964.
FSO-470-A
260 hp (194 kW) at 3000 rpm, dry weight 533 lb (242 kg), Supercharged model, specifically approved for helicopters. Certified 2 February 1955.

== Applications ==
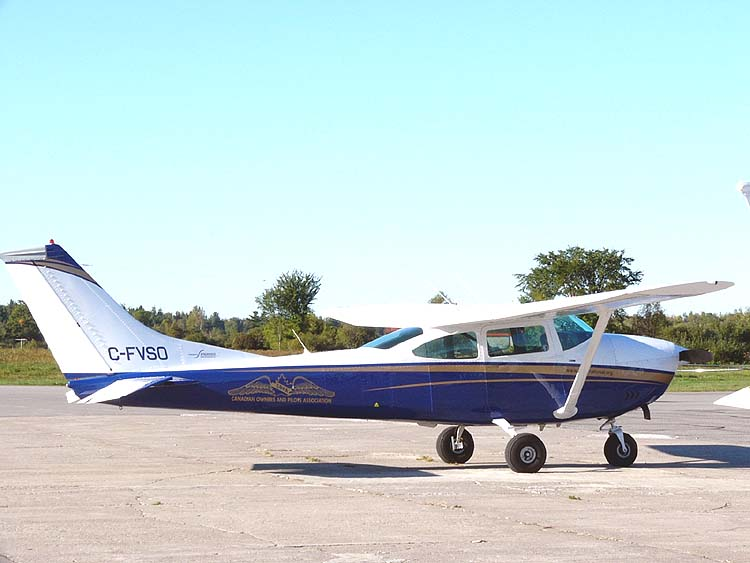
Cessna 182K equipped with a Continental O-470R powerplant

E165

- Boisavia Mercurey
- Luscombe 11

E185

- Beechcraft Bonanza
- Macchi M.B.320
- Muniz Casmuniz 52
- Ryan Navion

E225

- Beechcraft Bonanza
- Beechcraft T-34 Mentor
- Fletcher FD-25
- Fletcher FL-23
- Ryan Navion

E260

- Robertson SRX-1 Skyshark

O-470

- Associated Air Liberty 181
- Beechcraft Bonanza
- Bellanca Cruisemaster
- Cessna 180
- Cessna 182 Skylane
- Cessna 187
- Cessna 188
- Cessna 310
- DINFIA IA 53
- Falconar SAL Mustang
- Fanaero-Chile Chincol
- Fuji LM-1
- HAL Krishak
- Maestranza Central de Aviación HF XX-02
- Meyers 200
- O-1 Bird dog
- PZL-104 Wilga
- SIAI-Marchetti FN.333 Riviera
- St-Just Cyclone
- Stinson 108 (modified under STC)
- Taylorcraft Ranch Wagon
- Yeoman Cropmaster

IO-470

- Aérotrain 01 – experimental hover train project
- Auster AOP.9
- Beechcraft Baron
- Beechcraft Bonanza
- Cessna 185
- Cessna 205
- Cessna 210
- Cessna 310
- Meyers 200
- Navion G Rangemaster
- PAC Fletcher
- Procaer Picchio
- Ryan Navion

== Specifications (O-470-11) ==
Data from Type Certificate Data Sheet E-269.

=== General characteristics ===
- Type: six-cylinder air-cooled horizontally opposed aircraft piston engine
- Bore: 5.0 in (127.0 mm)
- Stroke: 4.0 in (101.6 mm)
- Displacement: 471 in^{3} (7.7 L)
- Dry weight: 391 lb dry (177 kg)

=== Components ===
- Valvetrain: One intake and one exhaust valve per cylinder
- Fuel system: Bendix-Stromberg Model PS-5C carburetor
- Fuel type: 80/87 avgas
- Oil system: dry sump
- Cooling system: Air-cooled

=== Performance ===
- Power output: 213 hp (159 kW) at 2,575 rpm
- Specific power: 0.45 hp/in³ (20.4 kW/L)
- Compression ratio: 7.0:1
- Power-to-weight ratio: 0.54 hp/lb (0.90 kW/kg)

== See also ==
Comparable engines

- Lycoming O-480

Related lists

- List of aircraft engines
