= Propeller theory =

Hydrodynamics of screw propellers

Propeller theory is the science governing the design of efficient propellers. A propeller is the most common propulsor on ships, and on small aircraft.

== History ==
In the second half of the nineteenth century, several theories were developed. The momentum theory or disk actuator theory – a theory describing a mathematical model of an ideal propeller – was developed by W.J.M. Rankine (1865), Alfred George Greenhill (1888) and Robert Edmund Froude (1889). The propeller is modelled as an infinitely thin disc, inducing a constant velocity along the axis of rotation. This disc creates a flow around the propeller. Under certain mathematical premises of the fluid, there can be extracted a mathematical connection between power, radius of the propeller, torque and induced velocity. Friction is not included.

The blade element theory (BET) is a mathematical process originally designed by William Froude father of Robert Edmund Froude (1878), David W. Taylor (1893) and Stefan Drzewiecki to determine the behaviour of propellers. It involves breaking an airfoil down into several small parts then determining the forces on them. These forces are then converted into accelerations, which can be integrated into velocities and positions.

== Theory of operation ==
Marine propeller nomenclature
| 1) Leading edge 2) Face; 3) Fillet area 4) Hub or Boss; 5) Hub or Boss Cap | 6) Trailing edge 7) Back; 8) Propeller shaft 9) Stern tube bearing 10) Stern tube |

A propeller imparts momentum to a fluid which causes a force to act on the ship. The ideal efficiency of any propulsor is that of an actuator disc in an ideal fluid. This is called the Froude efficiency and is a natural limit which cannot be exceeded by any device, no matter how good it is. Any propulsor which has virtually zero slip in the water, whether this is a very large propeller or a huge drag device, approaches 100% Froude efficiency. The essence of the actuator-disc theory is that if the slip is defined as the ratio of fluid velocity increase through the disc to vehicle velocity, the Froude efficiency is equal to 1/(slip + 1). Thus a lightly loaded propeller with a large swept area can have a high Froude efficiency.

An actual propeller has blades made up of sections of helicoidal surfaces which can be thought to 'screw' through the fluid (hence the common reference to propellers as "screws"). Actually the blades are twisted airfoils or hydrofoils and each section contributes to the total thrust. Two to five blades are most common, although designs which are intended to operate at reduced noise will have more blades and one-bladed ones with a counterweight have also been used. Lightly loaded propellers for light aircraft and human-powered boats mostly have two blades, motor boats mostly have three blades. The blades are attached to a boss (hub), and while it can be a big boss, it should be as small as the needs of strength allow – with fixed-pitch propellers the blades and boss are usually a single casting.

An alternative design is the controllable-pitch propeller (CPP, or CRP for controllable-reversible pitch), where the blades are rotated normally to the drive shaft by additional machinery – usually hydraulics – at the hub and control linkages running down the shaft. This allows the drive machinery to operate at a constant speed while the propeller loading is changed to match operating conditions. It also eliminates the need for a reversing gear and allows for more rapid change to thrust, as the revolutions are constant. This type of propeller is most common on ships such as tugs where there can be enormous differences in propeller loading when towing compared to running free. The downsides of a CPP/CRP include: the large hub which decreases the torque required to cause cavitation, the mechanical complexity which limits transmission power and the extra blade shaping requirements forced upon the propeller designer.

For smaller motors there are self-pitching propellers. The blades freely move through an entire circle on an axis at right angles to the shaft. This allows hydrodynamic and centrifugal forces to 'set' the angle the blades reach and so the pitch of the propeller.

A propeller that turns clockwise to produce forward thrust, when viewed from aft, is called right-handed. One that turns anticlockwise is said to be left-handed. Larger vessels often have twin screws to reduce heeling torque, counter-rotating propellers, the starboard screw is usually right-handed and the port left-handed, this is called outward turning. The opposite case is called inward turning. Another possibility is contra-rotating propellers, where two propellers rotate in opposing directions on a single shaft, or on separate shafts on nearly the same axis. Contra-rotating propellers offer increased efficiency by capturing the energy lost in the tangential velocities imparted to the fluid by the forward propeller (known as "propeller swirl"). The flow field behind the aft propeller of a contra-rotating set has very little "swirl", and this reduction in energy loss is seen as an increased efficiency of the aft propeller.

An azimuthing propeller is a propeller that turns around the vertical axis. The individual airfoil-shaped blades turn as the propeller moves so that they are always generating lift in the vessel's direction of movement. This type of propeller can reverse or change its direction of thrust very quickly.

Fixed-wing aircraft are also subject to the P-factor effect, in which a rotating propeller will yaw an aircraft slightly to one side because the relative wind it produces is asymmetrical. It is particularly noticeable when climbing, but is usually simple to compensate for with the aircraft's rudder. A more serious situation can exist if a multi-engine aircraft loses power to one of its engines, in particular the one which is positioned on the side that enhances the P-factor. This power plant is called the critical engine and its loss will require more control compensation by the pilot. Geometric pitch is the distance an element of an airplane propeller would advance in one revolution if it were moving along a helix having an angle equal to that between the chord of the element and a plane perpendicular to the propeller axis.

== Forces acting on a foil ==
The force (F) experienced by a foil is determined by its area (A), fluid density (ρ), velocity (V) and the angle of the foil to the fluid flow, called angle of attack ($\alpha$), where:

$$\frac {F}{\rho AV^2} = f(R_n, \alpha)$$

The force has two parts – that normal to the direction of flow is lift (L) and that in the direction of flow is drag (D). Both can be expressed mathematically:

$L = C_L \tfrac {1}{2} \rho V^2 A$ and $D = C_D {\tfrac {1}{2} \rho V^2 A}$

where C_{L} and C_{D} are lift coefficient and drag coefficient respectively.

Each coefficient is a function of the angle of attack and Reynolds number. As the angle of attack increases lift rises rapidly from the no lift angle before slowing its increase and then decreasing, with a sharp drop as the stall angle is reached and flow is disrupted. Drag rises slowly at first and as the rate of increase in lift falls and the angle of attack increases drag increases more sharply.

For a given strength of circulation ($\tau$), $\mbox{Lift} = L = \rho V \tau$. The effect of the flow over and the circulation around the foil is to reduce the velocity over the face and increase it over the back of the blade. If the reduction in pressure is too much in relation to the ambient pressure of the fluid, cavitation occurs, bubbles form in the low pressure area and are moved towards the blade's trailing edge where they collapse as the pressure increases, this reduces propeller efficiency and increases noise. The forces generated by the bubble collapse can cause permanent damage to the surfaces of the blade.

== Propeller thrust equation ==
=== Single blade ===
Taking an arbitrary radial section of a blade at r, if revolutions are N then the rotational velocity is $\scriptstyle 2\pi N r$. If the blade was a complete screw it would advance through a solid at the rate of NP, where P is the pitch of the blade. In water the advance speed, $\scriptstyle V_a$, is rather lower. The difference, or slip ratio, is:

$$\mbox{Slip} = \frac{NP-V_a}{NP} = 1-\frac{J}{p}$$

where $\scriptstyle J=\frac{V_a}{ND}$ is the advance coefficient, and $\scriptstyle p=\frac{P}{D}$ is the pitch ratio, with $\scriptstyle D$ being the diameter of the propeller.

The forces of lift and drag on the blade, dA, where force normal to the surface is dL:

$$\mbox{d}L = \frac {1}{2}\rho V_1^2 C_L dA = \frac {1}{2}\rho C_L[V_a^2(1+a)^2+4\pi^2r^2(1-a')^2]b\mbox{d}r$$

where:

$$\begin{align}V_1^2 &= V_a^2(1+a)^2+4\pi^2r^2(1-a')^2\\
\mbox{d}D &= \frac{1}{2}\rho V_1^2C_D\mbox{d}A = \frac{1}{2}\rho C_D[V_a^2(1+a)^2+4\pi^2r^2(1-a')^2]b\mbox{d}r\end{align}$$

These forces contribute to thrust, T, on the blade:

$$\mbox{d}T = \mbox{d}L\cos\varphi-\mbox{d}D\sin\varphi = \mbox{d}L(\cos\varphi-\frac{\mbox{d}D}{\mbox{d}L}\sin\varphi)$$

where:

$$\begin{align}\tan\beta &= \frac{\mbox{d}D}{\mbox{d}L} = \frac{C_D}{C_L}\\
&= \frac{1}{2}\rho V_1^2 C_L \frac{\cos(\varphi+\beta)}{\cos\beta}b\mbox{d}r\end{align}$$

As $\scriptstyle V_1 = \frac{V_a(1+a)}{\sin\varphi}$,

$$\mbox{d}T = \frac{1}{2}\rho C_L \frac{V_a^2(1+a)^2\cos(\varphi+\beta)}{\sin^2\varphi \cos\beta}b\mbox{d}r$$

From this total thrust can be obtained by integrating this expression along the blade. The transverse force is found in a similar manner:

$$\begin{align}\mbox{d}M &= \mbox{d}L\sin\varphi+\mbox{d}D\cos\varphi\\
&= \mbox{d}L(\sin\varphi+\frac{\mbox{d}D}{\mbox{d}L}\cos\varphi)\\
&= \frac{1}{2}\rho V_1^2 C_L \frac{\sin(\varphi+\beta)}{\cos\varphi}b\mbox{d}r\end{align}$$

Substituting for $\scriptstyle V_1$ and multiplying by r, gives torque as:

$$\mbox{d}Q = r\mbox{d}M = \frac{1}{2}\rho C_L \frac{V_a^2(1+a)^2\sin(\varphi+\beta)}{\sin^2\varphi\cos\beta}br\mbox{d}r$$

which can be integrated as before.

The total thrust power of the propeller is proportional to $\scriptstyle TV_a$ and the shaft power to $\scriptstyle 2\pi NQ$. So efficiency is $\scriptstyle\frac{TV_a}{2\pi NQ}$. The blade efficiency is in the ratio between thrust and torque:

$$\mbox{blade element efficiency} = \frac{V_a}{2\pi Nr}\cdot\frac{1}{\tan(\varphi+\beta)}$$

showing that the blade efficiency is determined by its momentum and its qualities in the form of angles $\scriptstyle \varphi$ and $\scriptstyle \beta$, where $\scriptstyle \beta$ is the ratio of the drag and lift coefficients.

This analysis is simplified and ignores a number of significant factors including interference between the blades and the influence of tip vortices.

=== Thrust and torque ===
The thrust, T, and torque, Q, depend on the propeller's diameter, D, revolutions, N, and rate of advance, $V_a$, together with the character of the fluid in which the propeller is operating and gravity. These factors create the following non-dimensional relationship:

$$T = \rho V^2 D^2 \left[ f_1\left(\frac {ND}{V_a}\right), f_2\left(\frac {v}{V_a D}\right), f_3\left(\frac {gD}{V_a^2}\right) \right]$$

where $f_1$ is a function of the advance coefficient, $f_2$ is a function of the Reynolds' number, and $f_3$ is a function of the Froude number. Both $f_2$ and $f_3$ are likely to be small in comparison to $f_1$ under normal operating conditions, so the expression can be reduced to:

$$T = \rho V_a^2 D^2 \times f_r \left(\frac {ND}{V_a}\right)$$

For two identical propellers the expression for both will be the same. So with the propellers $T_1, T_2$, and using the same subscripts to indicate each propeller:

$$\frac {T_1}{T_2} = \frac{\rho_1}{\rho_2} \times \frac{V_{a1}^2}{V_{a2}^2} \times \frac{D_1^2}{D_2^2}$$

For both Froude number and advance coefficient:

$$\frac {T_1}{T_2} = \frac {\rho_1}{\rho_2} \times \frac {D_1^3}{D_2^3} = \frac {\rho_1}{\rho_2} \lambda^3$$

where $\lambda$ is the ratio of the linear dimensions.

Thrust and velocity, at the same Froude number, give thrust power:

$$\frac {P_{T1}}{P_{T2}} = \frac {\rho_1}{\rho_2} \lambda^{3.5}$$

For torque:

$$Q = \rho V_a^2 D^3 \times f_q \left(\frac{ND}{V_a}\right)$$

$$. . .$$

== Actual performance ==
When a propeller is added to a ship its performance is altered; there is the mechanical losses in the transmission of power; a general increase in total resistance; and the hull also impedes and renders non-uniform the flow through the propeller. The ratio between a propeller's efficiency attached to a ship ($\scriptstyle P_D$) and in open water ($\scriptstyle P'_D$) is termed relative rotative efficiency.

The overall propulsive efficiency (an extension of effective power ($\scriptstyle P_E$)) is developed from the propulsive coefficient ($\scriptstyle PC$), which is derived from the installed shaft power ($\scriptstyle P_S$) modified by the effective power for the hull with appendages ($\scriptstyle P'_E$), the propeller's thrust power ($\scriptstyle P_T$), and the relative rotative efficiency.

$P'_E$/$P_T$ = hull efficiency = $\eta_H$

$P_T$/$P'_D$ = propeller efficiency = $\eta_O$

$P'_D$/$P_D$ = relative rotative efficiency = $\eta_R$

$P_D$/$P_S$ = shaft transmission efficiency

Producing the following:

$$PC = \left(\frac {\eta_H \cdot \eta_O \cdot \eta_R}{\mbox{appendage coefficient}}\right) \cdot \mbox{transmission efficiency}$$

The terms contained within the brackets are commonly grouped as the quasi-propulsive coefficient ($\scriptstyle QPC$, $\scriptstyle \eta_D$). The $\scriptstyle QPC$ is produced from small-scale experiments and is modified with a load factor for full size ships.

Wake is the interaction between the ship and the water with its own velocity relative to the ship. The wake has three parts: the velocity of the water around the hull; the boundary layer between the water dragged by the hull and the surrounding flow; and the waves created by the movement of the ship. The first two parts will reduce the velocity of water into the propeller, the third will either increase or decrease the velocity depending on whether the waves create a crest or trough at the propeller.

== See also ==
- Blade element theory
- Blade element momentum theory
- Propeller
- Variable-pitch propeller (disambiguation)
- Propeller (aeronautics)
- Ground-adjustable propeller
- Cavitation
