= Frood =

Frood may refer to:

== People ==
- Elizabeth Frood, New Zealand Egyptologist and academic
- Geoff Frood (1906–1995), Australian rules footballer
- Herbert Frood (1864–1931), English inventor, industrialist and entrepreneur
- Oren Frood (1889–1943), Canadian ice hockey player
- Frood Fouladvand, Iranian monarchist who disappeared in 2007

== Other uses ==
- Frood Mine, Greater Sudbury, Ontario, Canada

== See also ==
- Froot (disambiguation)
- Froude (disambiguation)
