= Froude =

Froude (/ˈfruːd/, FROOD) is a surname, and may refer to:

- Andrew Froude (1876–1945), Scottish civil servant
- Christine Froude (born 1947), British Anglican priest
- Derek Froude (born 1959), New Zealand athlete
- Fred Froude (1910–1978), Australian rules footballer
- Hurrell Froude (1803–1836), Anglican priest, son of Robert Froude
- James Anthony Froude (1818–1894), British historian, son of Robert Froude
- John Froude (1777–1852), English Anglican priest
- John H. Froude (born 1930), American politician from New Jersey
- Robert Froude (1771–1859), English Anglican priest
- Robert Edmund Froude (1846–1924), English engineer, hydrodynamicist and naval architect, son of William Froude
- William Froude (1810–1879), British engineer and hydrodynamicist, son of Robert Froude

== See also ==
- Froude, Saskatchewan - a small community in Canada
- Froude number
