= Ann C. Noble =

Sensory chemist

Ann C Noble
- Education: University of Massachusetts
- Known for: Aroma Wheel
- Scientific career
- Fields: Wine chemistry
- Workplaces: University of California, Davis

Ann C. Noble is a sensory chemist and retired professor from the University of California, Davis. During her time at the UC Davis Department of Viticulture and Enology, Noble and her colleagues developed the "Wine Aroma Wheel" which has enhanced the public understanding of wine tasting and terminology. At the time of her hiring at UC Davis in 1974, Noble was the first woman hired as a faculty member of the Viticulture department. Noble retired from Davis in 2002 and in 2003 was named Emeritus Professor of Enology. Since retirement she has participated as a judge in the San Francisco Chronicle Wine Competition.

== Career ==
After earning her Ph.D. in Food science from the University of Massachusetts Amherst, Noble was hired by UC Davis in 1974 to work in their sensory research program. After studying the techniques and application of wine tasting, Noble discovered that there was no objective framework or widely agreed upon terminology that a wine taster could use to describe things such as "earthy" aromas or the different smells of various fruits that can show up in a wine. In 1984, her research lead her to develop the "Aroma Wheel". Other research work went into how a wine's aroma and flavor can influence consumer choices as well as how wine tasters perceive astringency in wine. Noble, in addition to her work on the wine aroma wheel, also did research on multivariate statistics of sensory data and its applications. She also published over 150 research papers in her time there.

=== The Aroma Wheel ===
The Aroma Wheel provides a visual graphic of the different categories and aroma components that one can encounter in wine. The terminology used is standardized for use by both professionals and amateur wine tasters. Aroma is identified by the olfactory bulb from through inhalation of the wine's scent, and is used to identify the flavors from the grape itself. Bouquet refers to compounds that can affect the flavours, such as sugar, oak, and acid. The aroma wheel does not contain terms to describe texture or mouthfeel, however these are listed in the Australian "Mouthfeel Wheel". A separate Aroma Wheel has also been created for sparkling wine. The wheel breaks down wine aromas into 12 basic categories and then further sub-divided into different aromas that can fall into those main categories.

- Chemical – Includes aromas like sulfur and petroleum
- Pungent – Aromas like alcohol
- Oxidized – Aromas like acetaldehyde
- Microbiological – Aromas like yeast and lactic acid
- Floral – Aromas like Pelargonium geraniums and linalool
- Spicy – Aromas like licorice and anise
- Fruity – Aromas like blackcurrant and apricot
- Vegetative – Aromas like eucalyptus and artichoke
- Nutty – Aromas like walnut and hazelnut
- Caramelized – Aromas like butterscotch and molasses
- Woody – Aromas often imparted by oak like vanilla and coffee
- Earthy – Aromas such as mushroom and mildew

The German Wine Institute has created a special German language version of the Aroma Wheel meant to be specially adapted to German wines, with one wheel for white wines and one wheel for red wines. However, in the translation they removed the petroleum smell (and the entire "chemical" category) from the white wine wheel, despite the fact that mature Riesling wines - Germany's signature grape variety - are the best-known examples of wines that show this aroma. It seems that the motive for omitting the reference to petroleum was that many consumers perceive it as a "negative" aroma. The Institute's move has been criticized by foreign experts on German wines.

== Post-retirement ==
Noble currently teaches classes domestically and internationally. She also continues to work as a wine judge. She participates in meetings concerning Wine, Science, and Sensometrics in the U.S. and overseas. She is also writing a book on Wine Sensory evaluation.

== Honors ==
- 1994 – Honorary Research Lecturer, American Society of Viticulture and Enology
- 2000 – Award of Merit, American Wine Society
- 2001 – Outstanding women in California wine industry award, Decanter Magazine
- 2012 – One of “The 50 Most Powerful Women in Wine", The Drinks Business

== Select published work ==
This is an incomplete list

- Biotechnology and Bioengineering, 1976 "Aroma of sherry wines"
- Journal of Agricultural and Food Chemistry, 1980 "Bitterness and astringency of phenolic fractions in wine" doi:10.1021/jf60229a026
- Journal of Agricultural and Food Chemistry, 1980 "Wine head space analysis. Reproducibility and application to varietal classification" doi:10.1021/jf60228a030
- American Journal of Enology and Viticulture, 1990 "The Effects of Leaf and Cluster Shading on the Composition of Cabernet Sauvignon Grapes and on Fruit and Wine Sensory Properties"
- Journal of Agricultural and Food Chemistry, 1991 "Distribution of Free and Glycosidically Bound Monoterpenes in the Skin and Mesocarp of Muscat of Alexandria Grapes during Development]" doi:10.1021/jf00003a017
- American Journal of Enology and Viticulture, 1994 "The Effect of Ethanol, Catechin Concentration, and pH on Sourness and Bitterness of Wine"
- American Journal of Enology and Viticulture, 1995 "Application of Time-Intensity Procedures for the Evaluation of Taste and Mouthfeel"
- American Journal of Enology and Viticulture, 2000 "Formation of Hydrogen Sulfide and Glutathione During Fermentation of White Grape Musts"
- Journal of Agricultural and Food Chemistry, 2002 "Characterization of Odor-Active Compounds in Californian Chardonnay Wines Using GC-Olfactometry and GC-Mass Spectrometry" doi:10.1021/jf034747v
- American Journal of Clinical Nutrition, 2005 "Polyphenols: factors influencing their sensory properties and their effects on food and beverage preferences"
