= Fruit (disambiguation) =

Fruits are a typically sweet and/or sour, group of edible part/s of plants that resemble seed-bearing fruit.

Fruit or Fruits may also refer to:

== Botanical term ==
- Fruit (plant structure), ripened ovary of a flowering plant

== Places ==
- Fruit Valley, New York

== People ==
- Fruit Chan, a Hong Kong screenwriter, filmmaker and producer
- Zach Fruit (born 2000), American baseball player

== Arts, entertainment, and media ==
=== Music ===
- Fruit (album), a 2009 album by The Asteroids Galaxy Tour
- Fruit (band), an indie rock band from Australia
- F.R.U.I.T.S., a Russian musical duo

=== Other uses in arts, entertainment, and media ===
- Fruit (software), a computer chess program
- Fruit, a character on television series The Wire in the Stanfield Organization
- Fruits (book), a book by Valerie Bloom
- Fruits (magazine), a Japanese fashion magazine
- Fruit (novel), a 2004 novel by Brian Francis
- Fruit (podcast), a 2016 audio drama by Issa Rae

== Other uses ==
- Fruit (slang), a pejorative term for a gay man
- False Replies Unsynchronized with Interrogator Transmissions, or FRUIT, a problem in secondary surveillance radars

== See also ==
- Froot (disambiguation)
- Fructus (disambiguation)
- Fruity (disambiguation)
- Fruitcake
- Vegetable
