= Russian submarine Pochtovy =

Submarine built for the Imperial Russian Navy

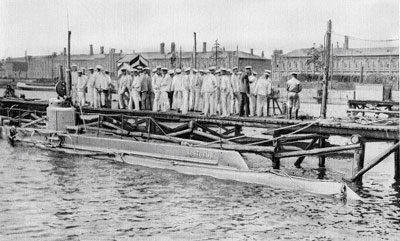

History

Russian Empire
- Name: Pochtovy
- Builder: Metal works in St Petersburg, Baltic Sea
- Launched: 1908
- Decommissioned: 1913
- Fate: Stricken 1913

General characteristics
- Displacement: 134 tons surfaced; 146 tons submerged
- Length: 34.4 m
- Beam: 3.0 m
- Draft: 2.8 m
- Propulsion: 2 petrol engines 260 hp (190 kW) combined
- Speed: 10.5 knots (19.4 km/h; 12.1 mph) surfaced; 6.2 knots (11 km/h; 7 mph) submerged
- Range: 350 nautical miles (650 km)
- Complement: 11
- Armament: 4 torpedo drop collars

Pochtovy (Russian: Почтовый) was a submarine built for the Imperial Russian Navy. The boat was designed by Drzewiecki and built at the Metal Works St Petersburg in 1908. She was funded by public subscription.

The primary objective of the design was to equip the submarine with a sole diesel propulsion system for use both when surfaced and submerged. This ship's machinery was a novel attempt at Air Independent Propulsion (AIP), using gasoline engines with air supplied by pressurised cylinders. Forty-five cylinders containing 350 cubic feet (9.9 m^{3}) of air at 2500 psi could give the boat a 28-nautical-mile (52 km) submerged range on one engine. The exhaust gases were vented via perforated pipe under the keel. The system proved reliable in trials but condensation problems and the tell-tale wake produced by the exhaust resulted in no further development and the boat was stricken in 1913.
