= Disk loading =

Characteristic of rotors/propellers

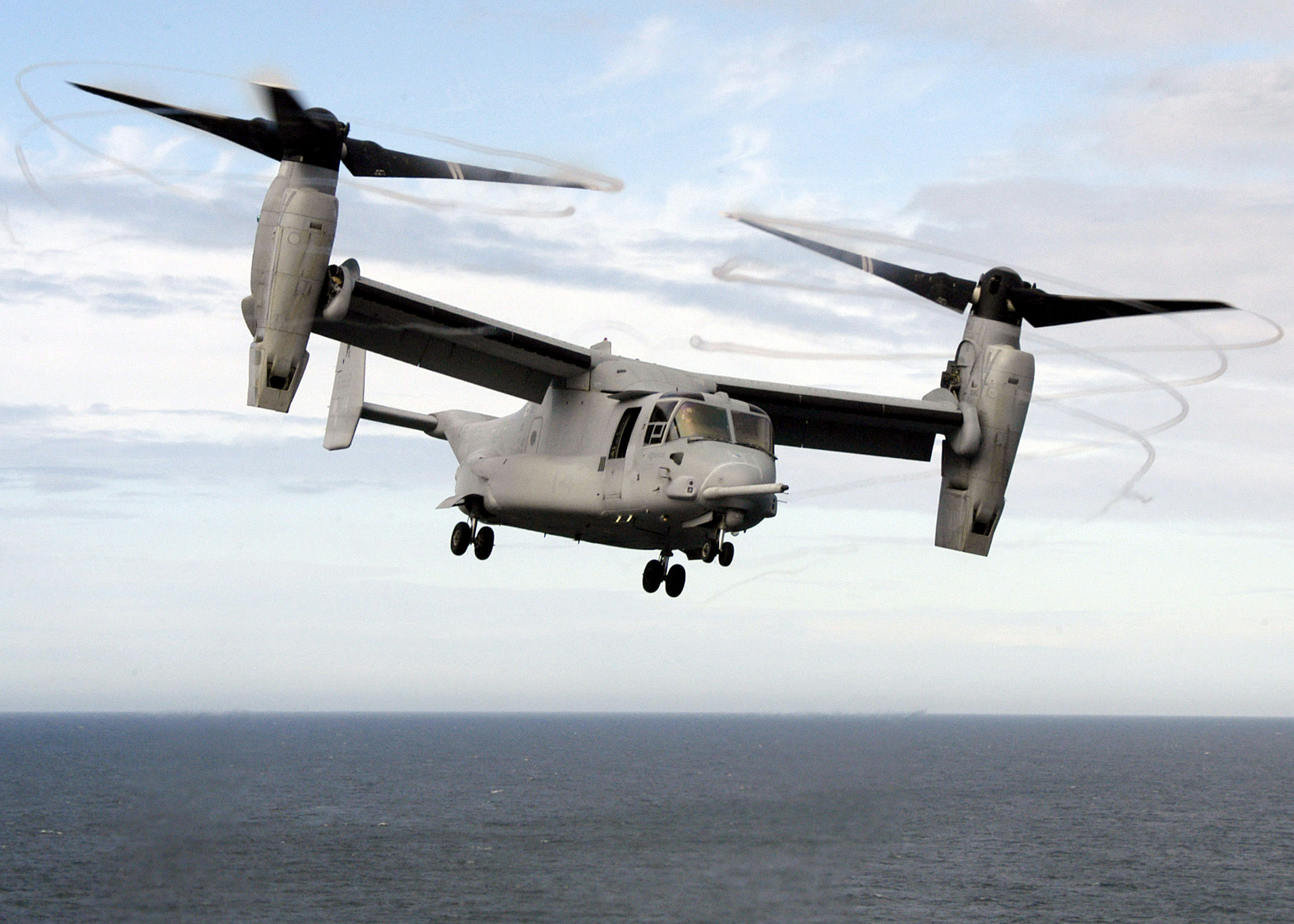
The MV-22 Osprey tiltrotor has a relatively high disk loading, producing visible blade tip vortices from condensation of the marine air in this photo of a vertical takeoff.

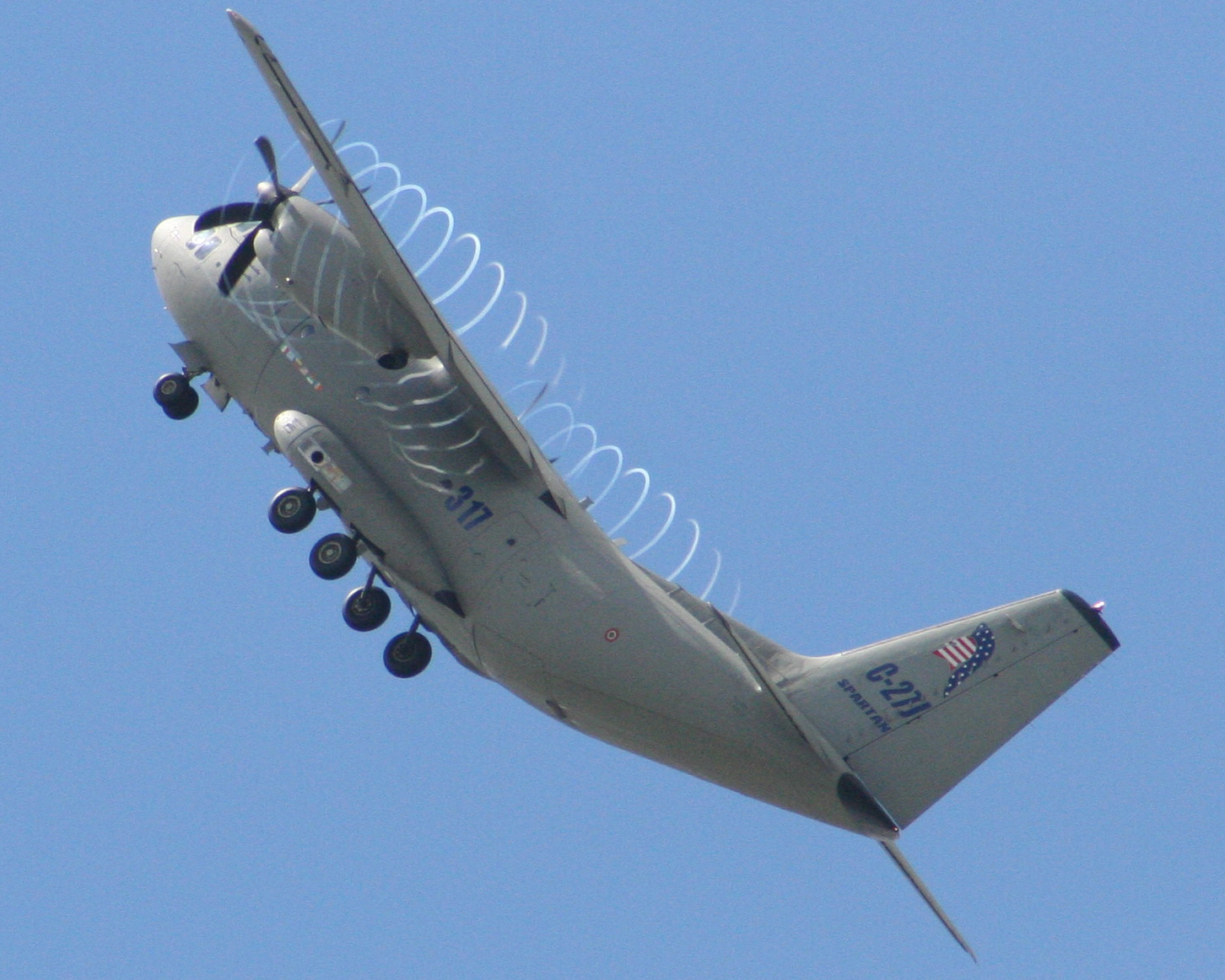
C-27J Spartan with propeller tip vortices condensation. The C-27J uses the same engines as the MV-22, but has higher disk loading.

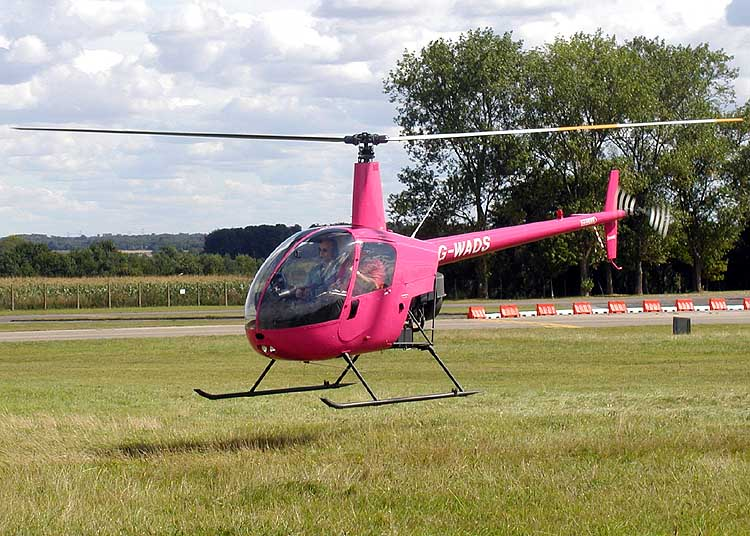
Piston-powered light utility helicopters like this Robinson R22 have relatively low main rotor disk loading.

In fluid dynamics, disk loading or disc loading is the average pressure change across an actuator disk, such as an airscrew. Airscrews with a relatively low disk loading are typically called rotors, including helicopter main rotors and tail rotors; propellers typically have a higher disk loading. The V-22 Osprey tiltrotor aircraft has a high disk loading relative to a helicopter in the hover mode, but a relatively low disk loading in fixed-wing mode compared to a turboprop aircraft.

== Rotors ==
Disk loading of a hovering helicopter is the ratio of its weight to the total main rotor disk area. It is determined by dividing the total helicopter weight by the rotor disk area, which is the area swept by the blades of a rotor. Disk area can be found by using the span of one rotor blade as the radius of a circle and then determining the area the blades encompass during a complete rotation. When a helicopter is being maneuvered, its disk loading changes. The higher the loading, the more power needed to maintain rotor speed. A low disk loading is a direct indicator of high lift thrust efficiency.

Increasing the weight of a helicopter increases disk loading. For a given weight, a helicopter with shorter rotors will have higher disk loading, and will require more engine power to hover. A low disk loading improves autorotation performance in rotorcraft. Typically, an autogyro (or gyroplane) has a lower rotor disk loading than a helicopter, which provides a slower rate of descent in autorotation.

== Propellers ==
In reciprocating and propeller engines, disk loading can be defined as the ratio between propeller-induced velocity and freestream velocity. Lower disk loading will increase efficiency, so it is generally desirable to have larger propellers from an efficiency standpoint. Maximum efficiency is reduced as disk loading is increased due to the rotating slipstream; using contra-rotating propellers can alleviate this problem allowing high maximum efficiency even at relatively high disc loading.

The Airbus A400M fixed-wing aircraft will have a very high disk loading on its propellers.

== Theory ==
The momentum theory or disk actuator theory describes a mathematical model of an ideal actuator disk, developed by W.J.M. Rankine (1865), Alfred George Greenhill (1888) and Robert Edmund Froude (1889). The helicopter rotor is modeled as an infinitesimally thin disk with an infinite number of blades that induce a constant pressure jump over the disk area and along the axis of rotation. For a helicopter that is hovering, the aerodynamic force is vertical and exactly balances the helicopter weight, with no lateral force.

The downward force on the air flowing through the rotor is accompanied by an upward force on the helicopter rotor disk. The downward force produces a downward acceleration of the air, increasing its kinetic energy. This energy transfer from the rotor to the air is the induced power loss of the rotary wing, which is analogous to the lift-induced drag of a fixed-wing aircraft.

Conservation of linear momentum relates the induced velocity downstream in the far wake field to the rotor thrust per unit of mass flow. Conservation of energy considers these parameters as well as the induced velocity at the rotor disk. Conservation of mass relates the mass flow to the induced velocity. The momentum theory applied to a helicopter gives the relationship between induced power loss and rotor thrust, which can be used to analyze the performance of the aircraft. Viscosity and compressibility of the air, frictional losses, and rotation of the slipstream in the wake are not considered.

=== Momentum theory ===
For an actuator disk of area $A$, with uniform induced velocity $v$ at the rotor disk, and with $\rho$ as the density of air, the mass flow rate $\dot{m}$ through the disk area is:

$$\dot m = \rho \, A \, v.$$

By conservation of mass, the mass flow rate is constant across the slipstream both upstream and downstream of the disk (regardless of velocity). Since the flow far upstream of a helicopter in a level hover is at rest, the starting velocity, momentum, and energy are zero. If the homogeneous slipstream far downstream of the disk has velocity $w$, by conservation of momentum the total thrust $T$ developed over the disk is equal to the rate of change of momentum, which assuming zero starting velocity is:

$$T= \dot m\, w.$$

By conservation of energy, the work done by the rotor must equal the energy change in the slipstream:

$$T\, v= \tfrac12\, \dot m\, {w^2}.$$

Substituting for $T$ and eliminating terms, we get:

$$v= \tfrac12\, w.$$

So the velocity of the slipstream far downstream of the disk is twice the velocity at the disk, which is the same result as for an elliptically loaded wing predicted by lifting-line theory.

=== Bernoulli's principle ===
To compute the disk loading using Bernoulli's principle, we assume the pressure in the slipstream far downstream is equal to the starting pressure $p_0$, which is equal to the atmospheric pressure. From the starting point to the disk we have:

$$p_0 =\, p_1 +\ \tfrac12\, \rho\, v^2.$$

Between the disk and the distant wake, we have:

$$p_2 +\ \tfrac12\, \rho\, v^2 =\, p_0 +\ \tfrac12\, \rho\, w^2.$$

Combining equations, the disk loading $T /\, A$ is:

$$\frac {T}{A} = p_2 -\, p_1 = \tfrac12\, \rho\, w^2$$

The total pressure in the distant wake is:

$$p_0 + \tfrac12\, \rho\, w^2 =\, p_0 + \frac {T}{A}.$$

So the pressure change across the disk is equal to the disk loading. Above the disk the pressure change is:

$$p_0 - \tfrac12\, \rho\, v^2 =\, p_0 -\, \tfrac14 \frac {T}{A}.$$

Below the disk, the pressure change is:

$$p_0 + \tfrac32\, \rho\, v^2 =\, p_0 +\, \tfrac34 \frac {T}{A}.$$

The pressure along the slipstream is always falling downstream, except for the positive pressure jump across the disk.

=== Power required ===
From the momentum theory, thrust is:

$$T = \dot m\, w = \dot m\, (2  v) = 2 \rho\, A\, v^2.$$

The induced velocity is:

$$v = \sqrt{\frac{T}{A} \cdot \frac{1}{2 \rho}}.$$

Where $T/A$ is the disk loading as before, and the power $P$ required in hover (in the ideal case) is:

$$P = T v = T \sqrt{\frac{T}{A} \cdot \frac{1}{2 \rho}}.$$

Therefore, the induced velocity can be expressed as:

$$v = \frac{P}{T} = \left [ \frac{T}{P} \right ] ^{-1}.$$

So, the induced velocity is inversely proportional to the power loading $T/P$.

== Examples ==
Correlation between disk loading and hover lift efficiency, for various VTOL aircraft

Disk loading comparison
Aircraft	Description	Max. gross weight	Total disk area	Max. disk loading
Robinson R22	Light utility helicopter	1,370 lb (635 kg)	497 ft^{2} (46.2 m^{2})	2.6 lb/ft^{2} (14 kg/m^{2})
Bell 206B3 JetRanger	Turboshaft utility helicopter	3,200 lb (1,451 kg)	872 ft^{2} (81.1 m^{2})	3.7 lb/ft^{2} (18 kg/m^{2})
CH-47D Chinook	Tandem rotor helicopter	50,000 lb (22,680 kg)	5,655 ft^{2} (526 m^{2})	8.8 lb/ft^{2} (43 kg/m^{2})
Mil Mi-26	Heavy-lift helicopter	123,500 lb (56,000 kg)	8,495 ft^{2} (789 m^{2})	14.5 lb/ft^{2} (71 kg/m^{2})
CH-53E Super Stallion	Heavy-lift helicopter	73,500 lb (33,300 kg)	4,900 ft^{2} (460 m^{2})	15 lb/ft^{2} (72 kg/m^{2})
MV-22B Osprey	Tiltrotor V/STOL	60,500 lb (27,400 kg)	2,268 ft^{2} (211.4 m^{2})	26.68 lb/ft^{2} (129.63 kg/m^{2})

== See also ==
- Wing loading
