= Similitude of ship models =

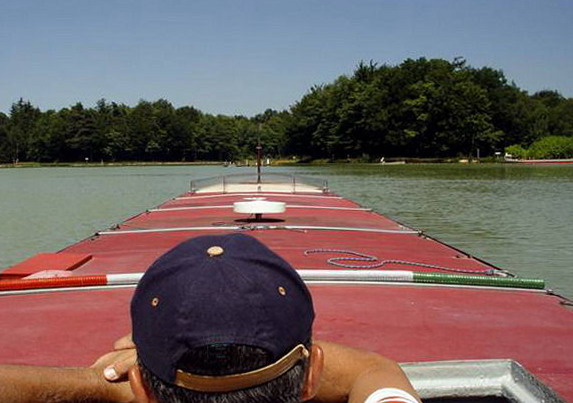
Captain's view from the bridge of a Port Revel supertanker model

Emergency stop of a supertanker model with an escort tug

Similitude of ship models refers the correspondence between model ships and the vessels they represent and there relevant metrics used. Similitude is important for modelling the behavior of ships in various situations both because these models can be more easily handled and steered and their comparatively much lower cost of construction and repair.

== Manned models ==
Many research workers, hydraulics specialists and engineers have used scale models for over a century, in particular in towing tanks. Manned models are small scale models that can carry and be handled by at least one person on an open expanse of water. They behave just like real ships, giving the shiphandler the same sensations. Physical conditions such as wind, currents, waves, water depths, channels and berths are reproduced realistically.

Manned models are used for research (e.g. ship behaviour), engineering (e.g. port layout), and for training in shiphandling (e.g. maritime pilots, masters and officers). They are usually at 1:25 scale.

== Similitude of manned models ==
Worldwide, manned model schools have chosen to apply the similitude law of William Froude (1810-1879) for its manned models. This means that gravity is considered to be preponderant over the other forces acting on the hull (viscosity, capillarity, cavitation, compressibility, etc.).

The different aspects of similitude may thus be defined as follows:

=== Physical similitude ===
Similitude of shape: The model has exactly the same geometric shape as the real ship. This means that all the length (L) dimensions of the real ship are divided by the same factor, the scale factor. The designers of Port Revel chose a scale (S) of 1:25, so:

S_{(L)} = 25 (smaller, hence distance is 25 times less)

In this similitude, the proportions are kept (the ratios between the various dimensions of the ship are identical). This is also the case with the block coefficient. Furthermore, the angles are a length ratio, so they are also identical to the original ones. The scale factors of the areas and volumes are deduced from this, i.e.:

S^{2}_{(L)} = 25^{2} = 625

S^{3}_{(L)} = 25^{3} = 15 625

Similitude of mass (M): The model used for shiphandling training must not only resemble the original but also move in the same way as the original when subjected to similar forces. Consequently, the scale factor for the mass (M) and displacement is the same as that for the volume, i.e.:

S_{(M)} = S^{3}_{(L)} = 25^{3} = 15 625

Similitude of forces (F): If the external forces on the model are in similitude, like the shapes, masses and inertia, the model's movement will be in similitude. It can thus be shown that the forces (F) must be at the same scale as the masses and weights, so:

S_{(F)} = S_{(M)} = 25^{3} = 15 625

Similitude of speed(V): In agreement with Froude's law, the velocity scale is the square root of the length scale, so:

S_{(V)} = S^{1/2}_{(L)} = sqrt(25) = 5 (times slower than in real life)

Similitude of time (T): Time is a distance (L) over speed (V), so:

S_{(T)} = S_{(L)} / S_{(V)} = S^{1/2}_{(L)} = sqrt(25) = 5 (times faster than in real life)

Similitude of power (P): As the power P = F x V, hence S_{(P)} = S_{(F)} x S_{(V)}, so:

S_{(P)} = S^{3}_{(L)} x S^{1/2}_{(L)} = S^{7/2}_{(L)} = 25^{7/2} = 78 125

In conclusion, by choosing a scale of 1:25 for the lengths and by complying with Froude's law, the engineers at Sogreah – Port Revel built models 25 times smaller, operating 5 times more slowly, but as the distances are 25 times less, things occur 5 times faster. The ships are 78,125 times less powerful.

=== Similitude of manoeuvres ===
While the models must be in correct similitude, this is not enough. Other factors can affect the correct reproduction of the manoeuvres, such as the field of vision, on-board equipment, and wind.

- First, manoeuvres on a model require the same pilot's orders as those on a real ship. The only difference is that they are executed five times faster on the model, so there is no time to discuss them (in fact, the rate of operation is such that the captain and helmsman swap roles every hour to avoid fatigue). This encourages responses to become intuitive but based upon a pre-assessed but flexible plan. What is a crisis on Day 1 of a manned model course becomes routine by Days 3+.
- The captain's position gives him a true field of vision from the bridge. He gives his orders to the helmsman, who is seated in front of him and operates the wheel and engine.
- Control panels show the usual information (engine speed, rudder angle, heading, log, wind speed and direction, shackles of chain lowered). This information is shown in real-life values to help the trainee forget as far as possible that he is on a scale model.
- The ships are fitted with bow and stern thrusters and operational anchors. They behave like real ships from this point of view as well.
- Tugs are under the captain's orders via remote control, and are handled by a real tug captain.
- As far as the wind is concerned, it should be recalled that as the speed scale factor is 1 in 5, a wind of 10 knots on the lake is equivalent to a 50 knot squall in reality. Ripples on the surface of the water and the movement of leaves on the trees are therefore unreliable indicators. The wind and ship speeds displayed on the control panel are therefore very important for trainees. However, the lake is situated in a forest in a region with little wind, so that uncontrollable wind effects are minimised.

40 years' experience have shown that students quickly learn how to control the models just as they do the real ships that they are used to manoeuvring.
Manned model exercises promote good situational and spatial awareness, a lack of which contributes to most accidents and incidents.

Those who have trained on both claim that scale models are complementary to electronic simulators. While manoeuvres with currents, waves, tugs, anchors, bank effects, etc. are reproduced more accurately on scale models, numerical simulators are more realistic when it comes to the bridge environment.
