= Admiralty Experiment Works =

Historical research department of the British Navy

Admiralty Experiment Works (AEW)
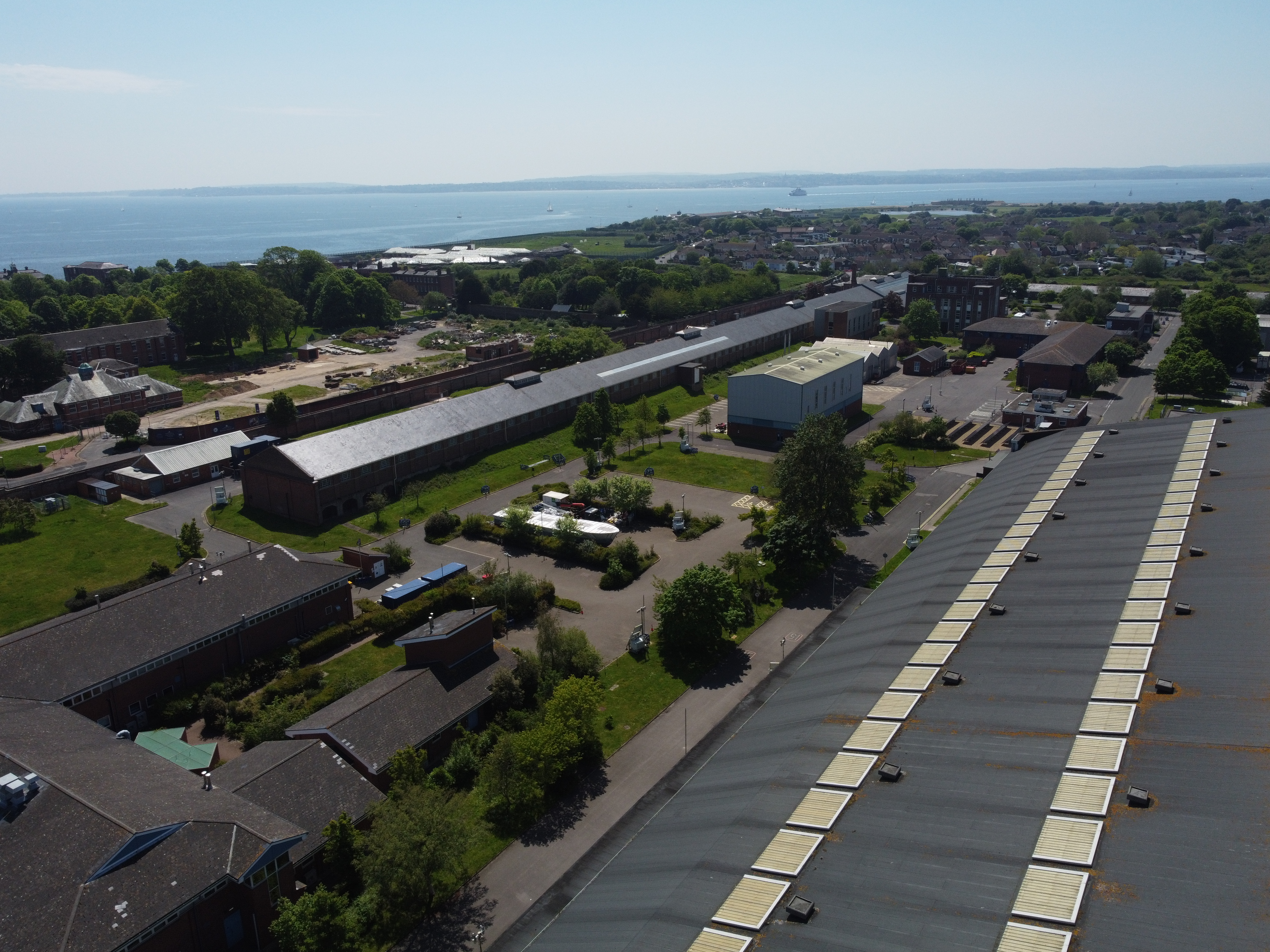
- The former AEW, Haslar: in the foreground the roof of the Manoeuvring Tank; in the background No. 2 Ship Tank.

Department overview
- Formed: 1872
- Dissolved: 1977
- Superseding Department: Admiralty Marine Technology Establishment
- Jurisdiction: Government of the United Kingdom
- Headquarters: Haslar, Gosport, England
- Parent Department: Admiralty

The Admiralty Experiment Works (AEW) was the British Admiralty research establishment, responsible for improving propeller design, manoeuvrability and seakeeping in Royal Navy vessels. The Experiment Works existed from 1872 to 1977 and for most of its history was based at the Haslar Gunboat Yard in Gosport, South Hampshire. It ceased independent operations in 1977, merging with the Admiralty Marine Technology Establishment and ultimately with the Defence Research Agency in the Ministry of Defence.

== History ==
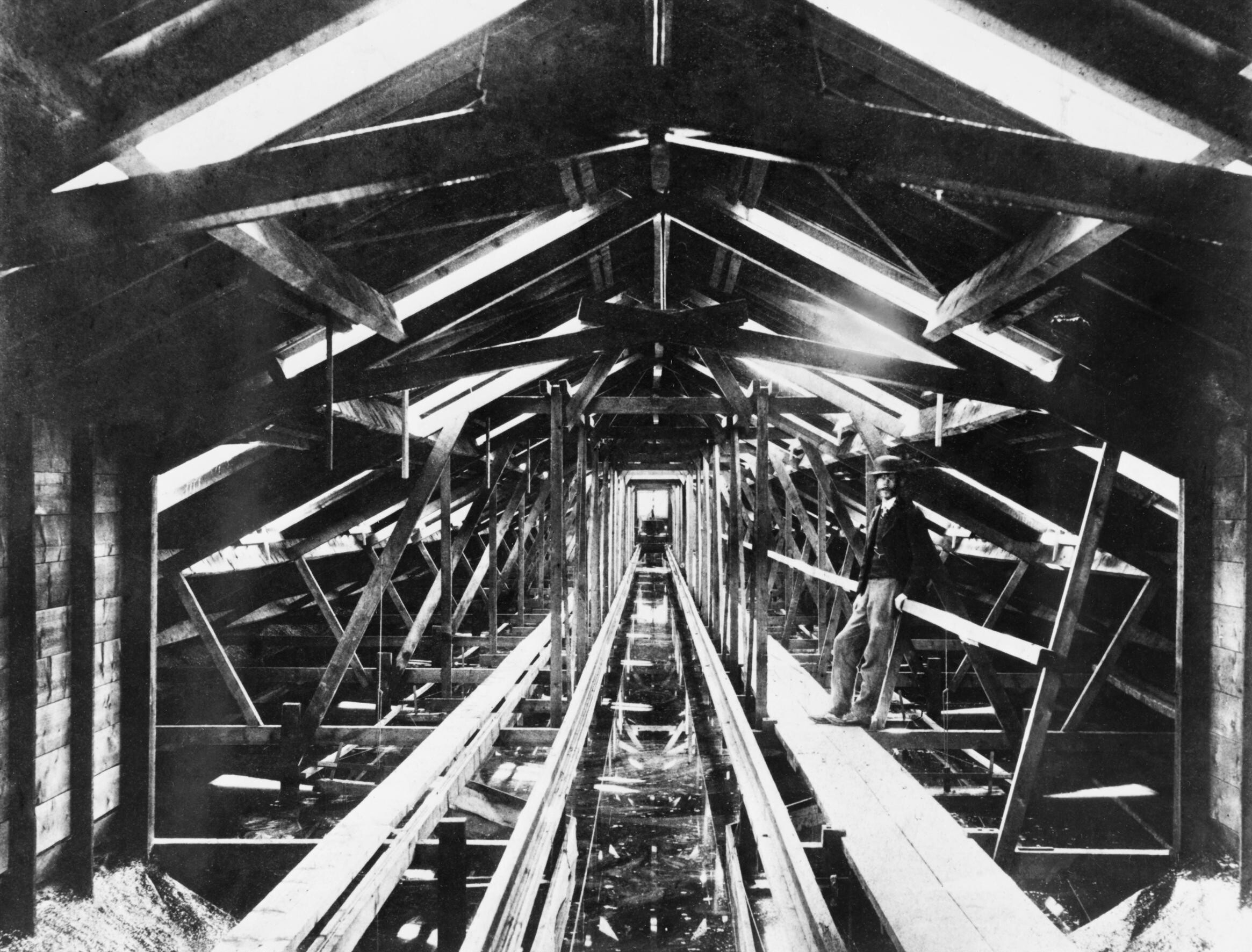
The Admiralty's First Naval Test Tank at Torquay, Devon (c. 1872).

The Admiralty Experiment Works (AEW) was founded at Chelston Cross, Torquay, in 1872. It was Admiralty's first research establishment, and was initially structured around experimental work by engineer and naval architect William Froude, concerning methods to accelerate vessel propulsion. The Establishment was administered by the Director of Naval Construction, reporting to the Third Sea Lord in his capacity as Controller of the Navy. In 1868 Froude was paid £2,000 by the Admiralty to construct an experimental tank, close to his home in Torquay, for conducting water resistance tests, and from 1872 the site was known as the Admiralty Experiment Works (Torquay).

Froude died in 1879, after which his son Robert Edmund Froude continued his work. In 1882, R. E. Froude was invited to design a new facility (as the lease on the site at Torquay was due to expire in 1886). Space to accommodate it was found at the south-west end of Haslar Gunboat Yard, and in 1887 the Experiment Works at Torquay closed and the establishment moved to what would become its permanent home at Haslar. By this time, its focus was centred on the model testing of ship's hulls and that year experiments began in the newly-constructed Number 1 Ship Tank, where models were towed through the water using a wooden overhead carriage. The 400-foot (120 m) long ship tank, built alongside the SW perimeter wall of the Gunboat Yard, was the main structure on the new site; an adjacent building at the southern end contained offices, a boiler room and the model-making workshop.

The Naval Defence Act 1889 led to a significant increase in shipbuilding; by the end of the First World War more than 500 different ship models had been tested by the Admiralty at Haslar (including the Navy's first British-designed submarine, the A-class, in 1902). Over time, research again shifted to focus on predictions of ship power, hydrodynamics and propeller design in relation to ship manoeuvrability and seakeeping. As its work began to expand, new research testing facilities were established at Haslar between (1930 and 1972) that enabled the works to extend their tests on models in a ship tank covering all classes of battleships, cruisers, destroyers, submarines and miscellaneous vessels. The results of these experiments were then used by Naval Construction Department enabling it to improve ship design and performance.

To meet the requirements of larger and faster ship designs, a new High Speed Tank (Number 2 Ship Tank) was opened in 1930, double the width and depth of the earlier tank, and, at 890 feet (270 m) in length, the longest water tank in the United Kingdom. The new tank was built within the SE perimeter wall of the former Gunboat Yard; an extension at its western end housed drawing offices, recording rooms, an electric power plant and model-making shop.

In the late 1930s work began on a cavitation tunnel, for propeller research, which began operating in 1941. A second and much larger cavitation tunnel, built by Blohm & Voss and removed by the British from Hamburg after the Second World War, was later reconstructed at Haslar and returned to operation in the 1950s. There were several other post-war developments on the site: a facility for testing anchor designs was added in 1948, a photography laboratory was built and in 1957 the original Ship Tank was extended northwards to a total length of just under 550 feet (170 m). In the early 1950s, steering and manoeuvring experiments were being conducted on Horsea Lake, but in 1955 work began on building a large Manoeuvring Tank at AEW Haslar, which was completed in 1959. Measuring 400 ft (120 m) by 200 ft (61 m), and able to replicate a variety of wave forms, it is reputedly 'one of the largest hydrodynamic testing facilities in the world'. In 1958 the functions of the Director of Naval Construction became a division of the new Ship Department.

In 1977, AEW became part of the Admiralty Marine Technology Establishment, which itself in 1984 became a department of the unified Admiralty Research Establishment. In 1991 it became part of the tri-service Defence Research Agency (which in 1995 became DERA).

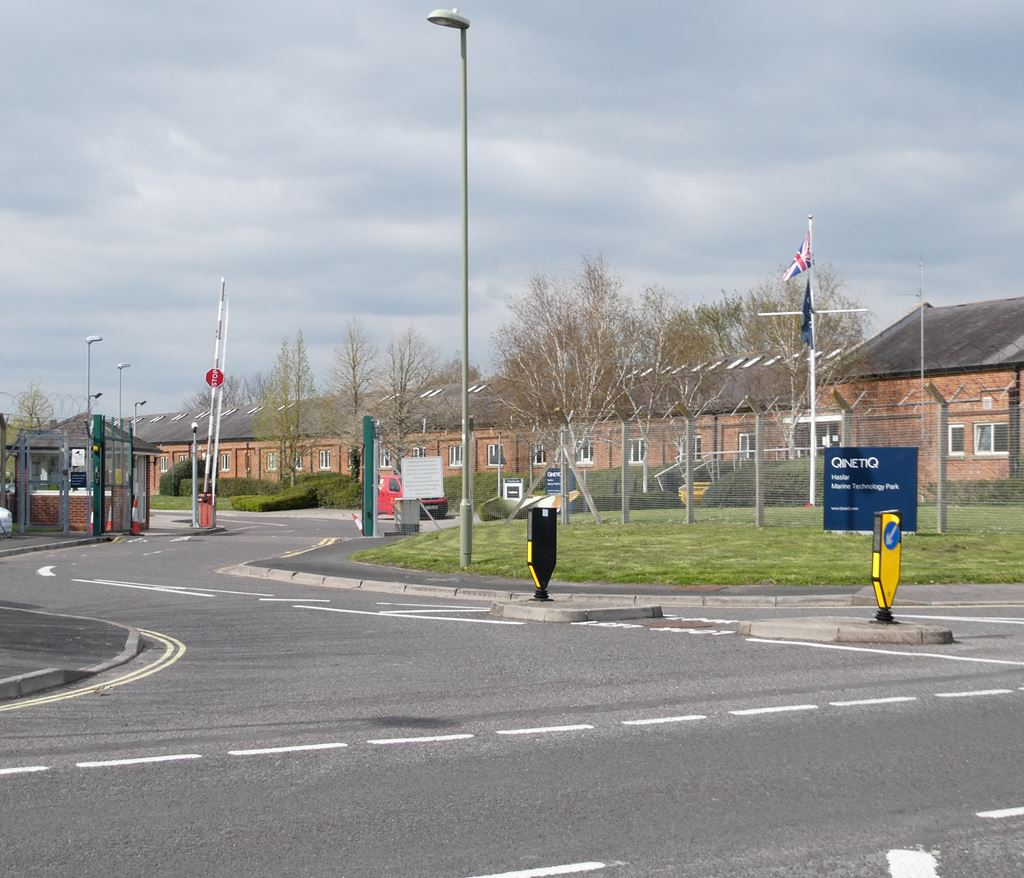
The entrance to QinetiQ Haslar Marine Technology Park; in the background is the former No. 1 Ship Tank building.

After more than a century of operation (and over half a million experiments), Number 1 Ship Tank was decommissioned in 1993; the tank iself was floored over and the building converted to office use. At the end of its 106 years of operation, it was said to have been 'the longest continuously-serving laboratory in the world'. The Number 1 Cavitation Tank was also decommissioned (and demolished) at about this time; but other facilities on the site were retained and upgraded. Number 2 Ship Tank, Number 2 Cavitation Tank and the Manoeuvring Tank all remain in use for experimental purposes.

Since 2001 the facility has been operated by QinetiQ; it is now known as Haslar Marine Technology Park.

== Timeline ==
- Board of Admiralty, Admiralty Experiment Works (AEW), (1872-1964)
- Ministry of Defence, Admiralty Experiment Works (AEW), (1964-1977)
- Ministry of Defence, Admiralty Marine Technology Establishment (AMTE), (1977-1984)
- Ministry of Defence, Admiralty Research Establishment (ARE), (1984-1991)
- Ministry of Defence, Defence Research Agency, (1991-1995)
