= Stefan Drzewiecki =

Polish engineer and inventor (1844–1938)

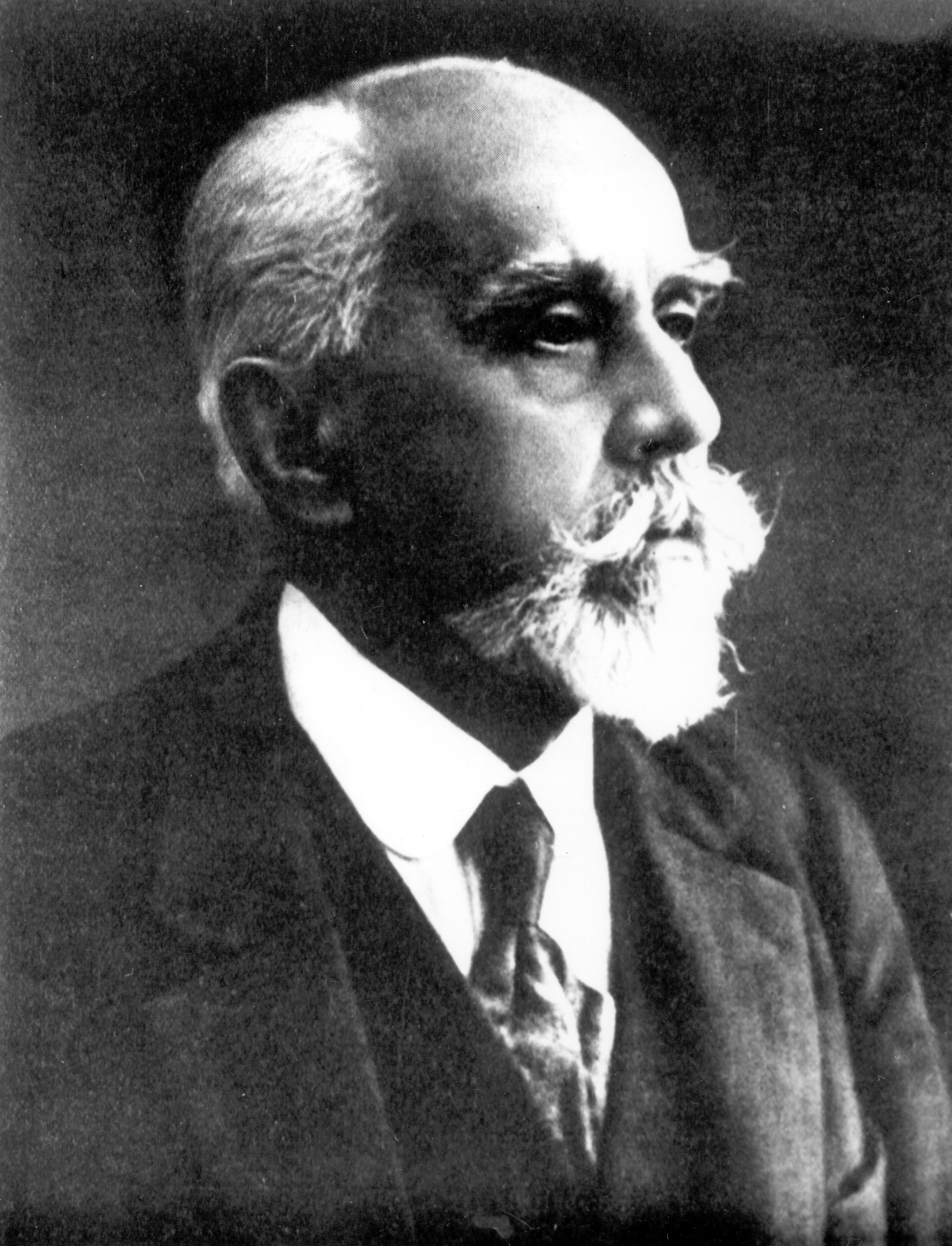
- Stefan Drzewiecki
- Born: July 26, 1844; Kunka, Russian Empire
- Died: April 23, 1938 (aged 93); Paris, France
- Education: École Centrale Paris
- Occupations: Engineer, constructor and inventor
- Known for: Submarine design Blade element theory Drzewiecki drop collar
- Awards: Order of St. George

Stefan Drzewiecki (Polish: [ˈstɛfan d͡ʐɛˈvjɛt͡skʲi]; Russian: Джеве́цкий Степа́н Ка́рлович (Казими́рович); Ukrainian: Джеве́цький Степа́н Ка́рлович (Казими́рович); 26 July 1844, Kunka (ru), Podolia, Russian Empire (today Kunka (uk), Ukraine) – 23 April 1938, Paris) was a Polish scientist, journalist, engineer, constructor and inventor, known for designing and constructing the world's first electric-powered submarine. He worked mainly in France and the Russian Empire.

He built the first submarine in the world with electric battery-powered propulsion in 1884. He also independently developed the blade element theory (BET), a mathematical process used to determine the behavior of propellers.

== Early life ==
Drzewiecki was born into Polish aristocratic family of national patriots. His grandfather Józef Drzewiecki served under generals Kościuszko and Dąbrowski. His father Karol Drzewiecki took part in the November Uprising against Russia. Young Stefan was sent by him away from partitioned Poland to complete his education in France.

He graduated in mathematics from the École Centrale Paris and received his engineering diploma. At the age of 19, he returned to Poland to take part in the January Uprising (1863-1864) against Russia. A few years later, he came back to Paris to finish his study.

== Career ==
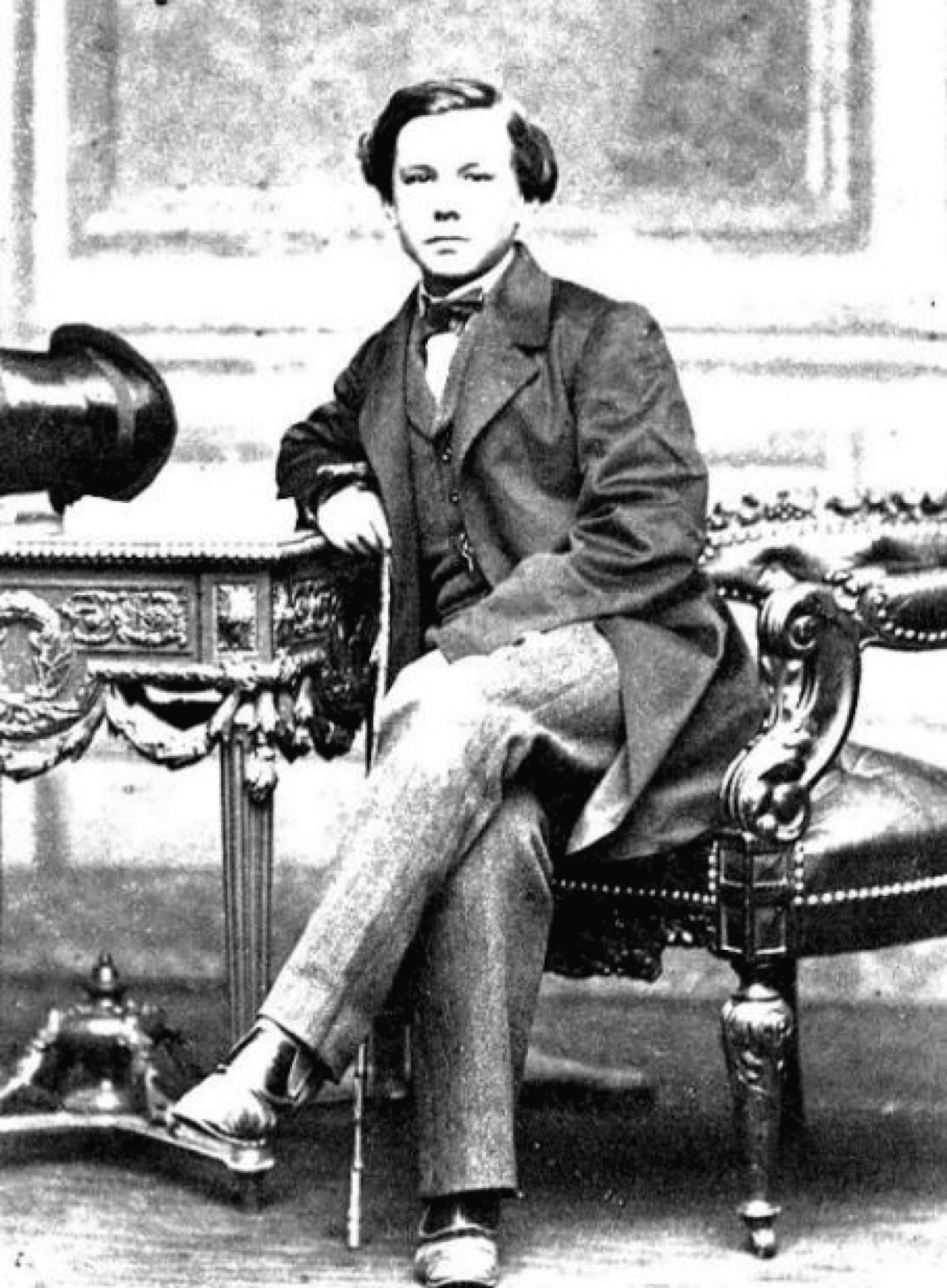
Stefan Drzewiecki in his youth

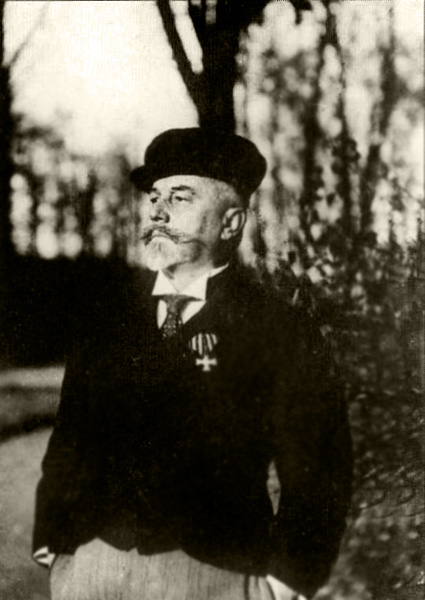
Stefan Dzhevetsky with St. George's Cross

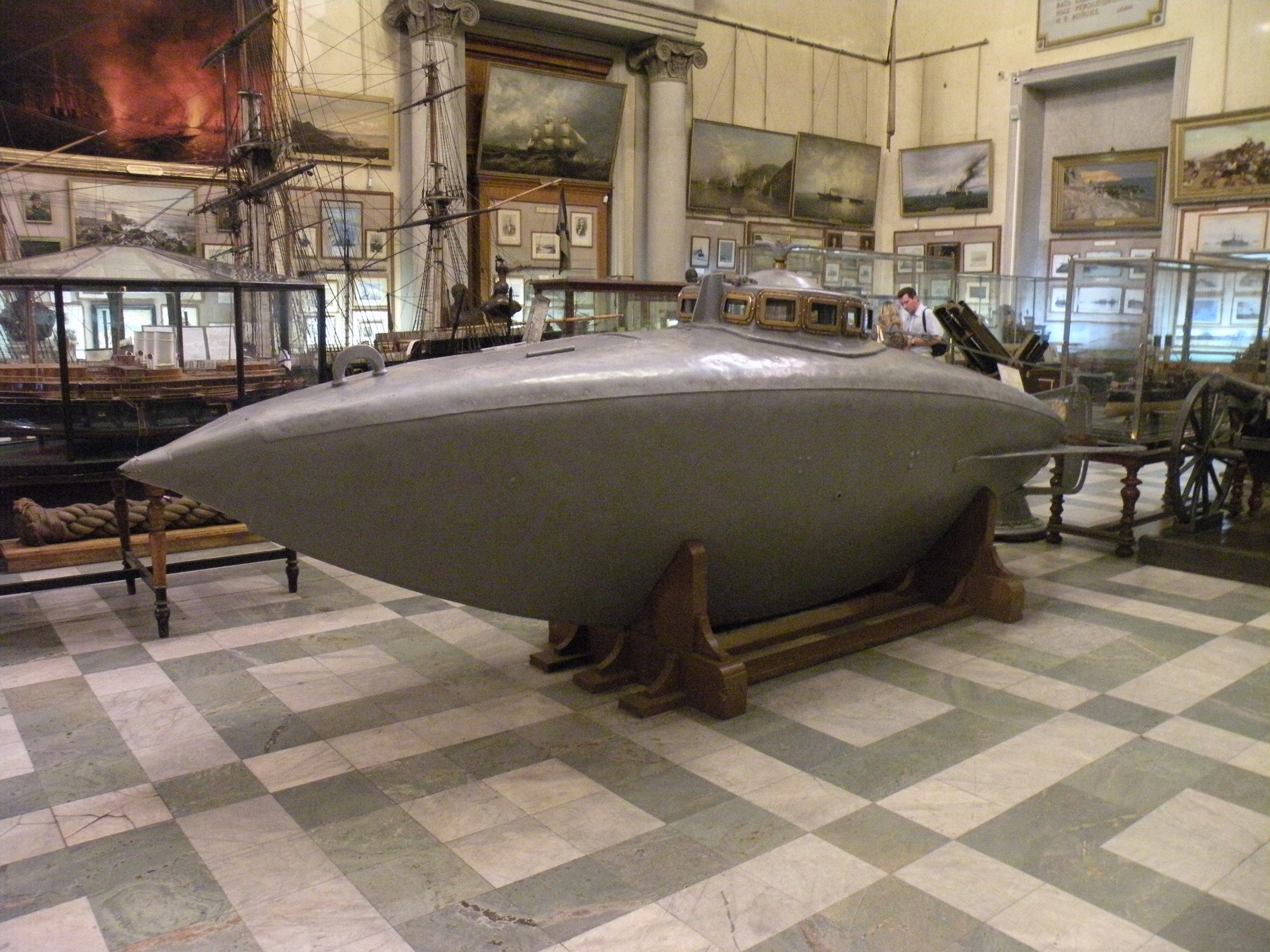
Drzewiecki-designed submarine built in 1881 and now in the Central Naval Museum, Saint Petersburg

In 1867, Drzewiecki made his first invention, a kilometre counter for horse-drawn carriages. After the fall of the Paris Commune in 1871, he left Paris for Vienna, where he settled at 2 Lindengasse and entirely focused on inventing. After the Vienna World's Fair in 1873, he travelled to St. Petersburg at the invitation of Grand Duke Konstantin, where he pursued a fruitful career as a mechanical engineer. His inventions from that period include an instrument which automatically drew on a map the route traveled by the ship at sea.

Drzewiecki distinguished himself mainly in aviation and ship building. Beginning in 1877, during the Russo-Turkish War, he developed several models of propeller-driven submarines that evolved from single-person vessels to a four-man model. He personally took part in the war for which he was awarded the Russian military decoration Order of St. George (4th Class).

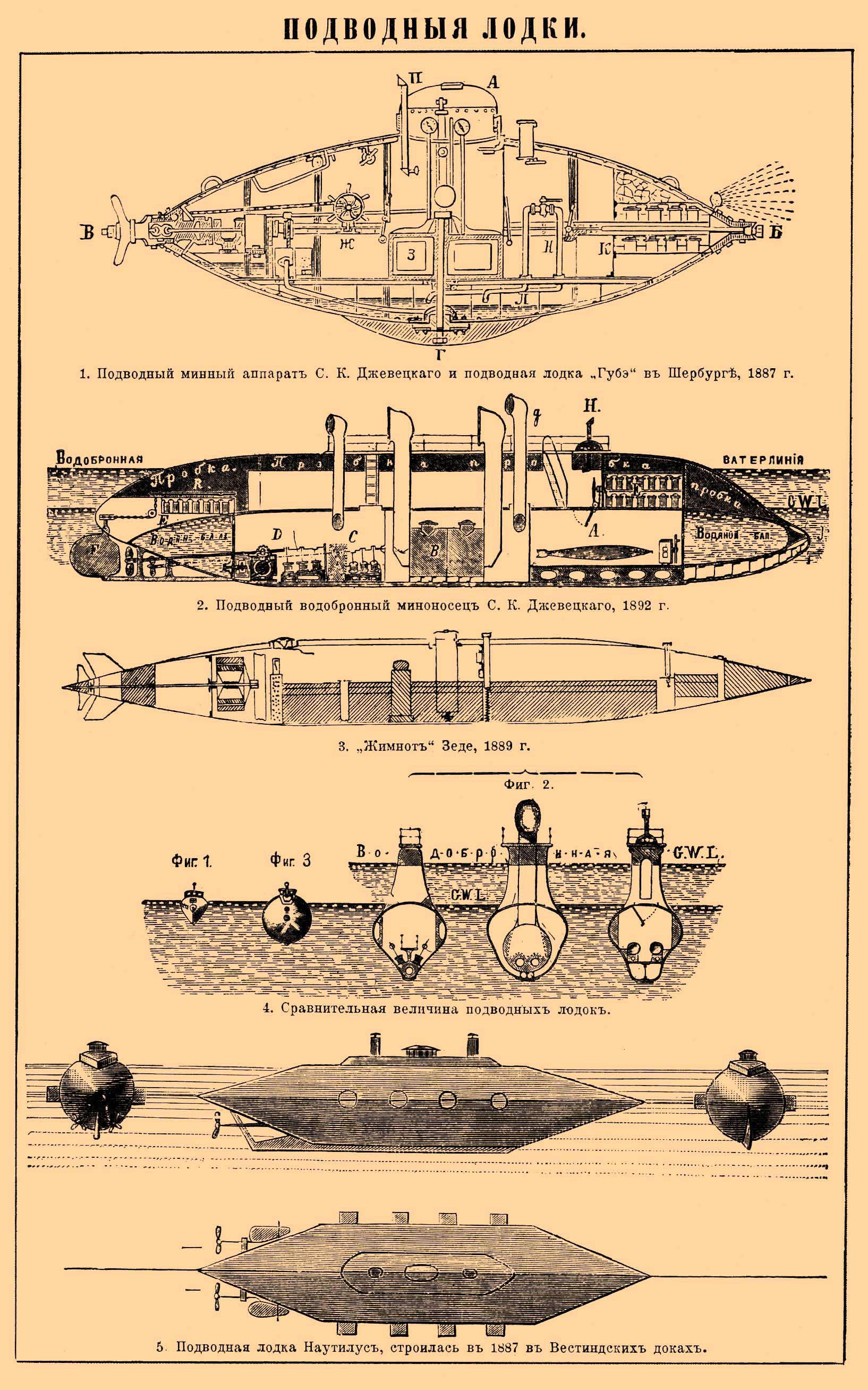
Illustration of Drzewiecki's submarine from Brockhaus and Efron Encyclopedic Dictionary (1890—1907).

In 1884, he converted 2 mechanical submarines, installed on each a 1 hp engine with the new, at the time, source of energy - batteries. On tests submarine went under the water against the flow of the Neva River, Russia at a rate of 4 knots. It was the first submarine in the world with electric battery-powered propulsion.

He developed the theory of gliding flight, developed a method for the manufacture of ship and plane propellers (1892), and presented a general theory for screw-propeller thrust (1920). He is known for developing several models of early submarines for the Russian Navy. In 1902, Drzewiecki designed the submarine Pocztowyj, which was powered by two combustion engines that operated both underwater and after surfacing. He also devised a torpedo-launching system for ships and submarines that bears his name, the Drzewiecki drop collar. He also made an instrument that drew the precise routes of ships onto a nautical chart.

His work Theorie générale de l'hélice (1920), was honored by the French Academy of Sciences as fundamental in the development of modern propellers. In it he presented a complete theory about the moving propeller based directly on the general laws of the resistance of fluids.

== Remembrance ==
Streets named in honour of Drzewiecki are located in a number of Polish cities including Warsaw, Wrocław, Gdańsk, Poznań, Biała Podlaska, Mielec and Szczecin.

In 1973, Drzewiecki and his submarine were featured on a postage stamp issued by the Polish Post in the PLN 2.70 denomination.

In 1991, a monument commemorating Drzewiecki was unveiled in the Ukrainian port city of Odesa where the inventor stayed for a period of time and tested his submarine in 1878.

In 2020, Drzewiecki was featured in a promotional publication titled Polacy światu. Znani i nieznani (Poles to the World. Known and Unknown) published by the Department of Cooperation with the Polish Diaspora and Poles Abroad of the Ministry of Foreign Affairs.

== See also ==
- List of Poles
- List of Polish inventors and discoverers
- Timeline of Polish science and technology
- List of pre-20th century submarines

== Notes ==
- Słownik polskich pionierów techniki pod redakcją Bolesława Orłowskiego. Katowice: Wydawnictwo „Śląsk”, 1986, s. 57. ISBN 83-216-0339-4.
- Alfred Liebfeld, Polacy na szlakach techniki. Warszawa: Wydawnictwa Szkolne i Pedagogiczne, 1985, s. 215–225. ISBN 83-02-01574-1.
- Krzysztof Kubiak, Wielki błękit wynalazców, biuletyn „Rzeczpospolitej” 11 grudnia 2010, Nr 47
- Jerzy Pertek, Polscy pionierzy podwodnej żeglugi, seria wydawnicza Wydawnictwa Morskiego Miniatury Morskie zeszyt 3: Polskie tradycje morskie, s. 26–49.
- Blade element theory of William Froude (1878), David W. Taylor (1893) and Stefan Drzewiecki to determine the behavior of propellers.
