= William Froude =

British engineer and naval architect

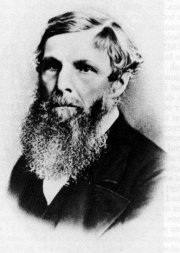
- William Froude
- Born: 28 November 1810; Devon, England
- Died: 4 May 1879 (aged 68); Simonstown, Cape Colony
- Education: Westminster School
- Spouse: Catherine Henrietta Elizabeth Holdsworth
- Children: Robert Edmund Froude, Eliza Margaret Froude
- Parent(s): Robert Froude, Margaret Spedding
- Engineering career
- Discipline: Hydrodynamics
- Institutions: Admiralty Experiment Works
- Projects: First ship test tank
- Significant design: Water brake dynamometer
- Significant advance: Hydrodynamics, Froude number, blade element theory
- Awards: Royal Medal (1876)

William Froude (/fruːd/; 28 November 1810 – 4 May 1879) was an English engineer, hydrodynamicist and naval architect. He was the first to formulate reliable laws for the resistance that water offers to ships (such as the hull speed equation) and for predicting their stability.

== Biography ==
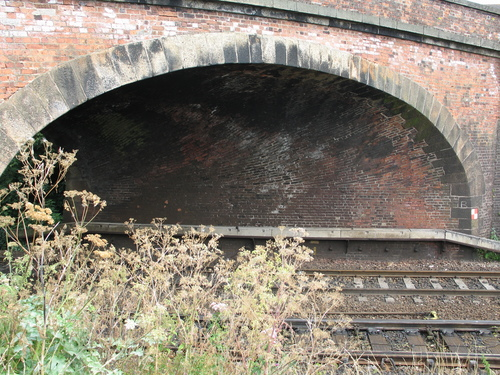
Skew arch at Cowley Bridge Junction

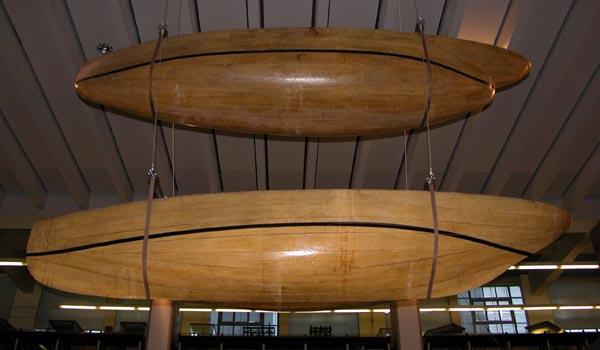
The hulls of Swan (above) and Raven (below) on display in the Science Museum, London

Froude was born at Dartington, Devon, England, the son of Robert Froude, Archdeacon of Totnes, and was educated at Westminster School and Oriel College, Oxford, graduating with a first in mathematics in 1832.

His first employment was as a surveyor on the South Eastern Railway, which, in 1837, led to Isambard Kingdom Brunel giving him responsibility for the construction of a section of the Bristol & Exeter Railway. It was here that he developed his empirical method of setting out track transition curves and introduced an alternative design to the helicoidal skew arch bridge at Rewe and Cowley Bridge Junction, near Exeter. During this period he lived in Cullompton and was Vicar's Warden at St Andrew's Church from 1842 to 1844. He organised and paid a large amount for the rebuilding of the chancel and other restoration work. He also offered to pay to restore the nave if local people would pay 10% of the cost, but this offer was refused. On completion of the Bristol to Exeter line in 1844 he left the town.

At Brunel's invitation, Froude turned his attention to the stability of ships in a seaway, and his 1861 paper to the Institution of Naval Architects became influential in ship design. This led to a commission to identify the most efficient hull shape, which he was able to fulfil by reference to scale models: he established a formula (now known as the Froude number) by which the results of small-scale tests could be used to predict the behaviour of full-sized hulls. He built a sequence of 3, 6, and (shown in the picture) 12-foot scale models and used them in towing trials to establish resistance and scaling laws.

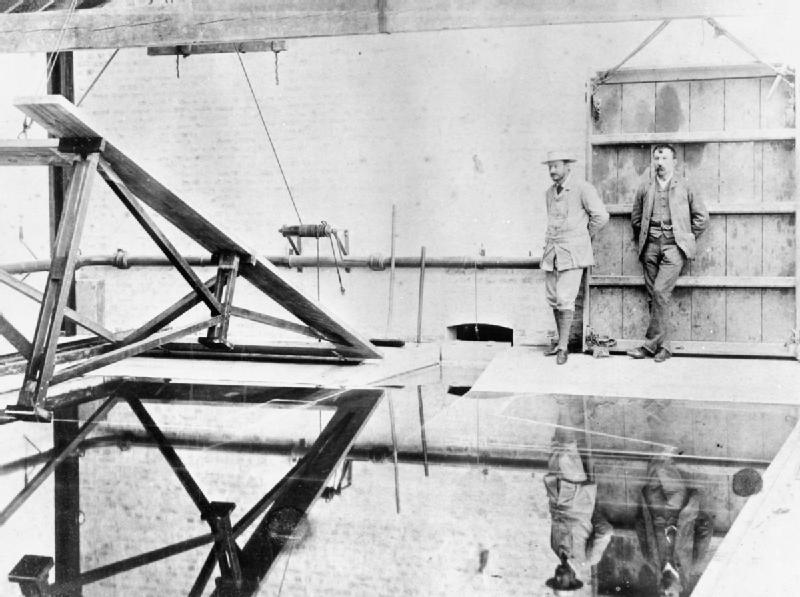
William Froude (left) and one of his staff with the first naval test tank (1872).

His experiments were vindicated in full-scale trials conducted by the Admiralty, and as a result, the first ship test tank was built, at public expense, at his home in Torquay. Here he was able to combine mathematical expertise with practical experimentation to such good effect that his methods are still followed today.

Froude also tested the "wave-line" theory of John Scott Russell. The model Raven had sharp lines in accordance with Scott Russell's theory. The Swan had fuller lines with blunt ends. Raven had less resistance at low speeds of the two, but Swan had less resistance at higher speeds. This showed that the "wave-line" theory was not as universal as claimed, and was the start of a better understanding of hull resistance.

In 1877, he was commissioned by the Admiralty to produce a machine capable of absorbing and measuring the power of large naval engines. He invented and built the world's first water brake dynamometer, sometimes known as the hydraulic dynamometer.

While on holiday as an official guest of the Royal Navy, he died in Simonstown, South Africa, where he was buried with full naval honours.

He was the brother of James Anthony Froude, a historian, and Hurrell Froude, writer and priest. William was married to Catherine Henrietta Elizabeth Holdsworth, daughter of the Governor of Dartmouth Castle, mercantile magnate and member of Parliament Arthur Howe Holdsworth.

His son Robert Edmund Froude, born in 1846, would go on to co-found Heenan & Froude Ltd in Birmingham. The company initially produced water brake dynamometers following his father's design and later a range of dynamometers of various types. The Froude name as a trademark has been an element in several equity transitions and exists currently under the monomym "Froude," a group which comprises Froude, Inc. (USA) and Froude, Ltd. (UK). Robert Froude would also further his father's theoretical work describing blade element theory in papers authored to the Royal Institution of Naval Architects. This included a description of momentum theory. Blade element theory and momentum theory would later be unified within the more comprehensive blade element momentum theory.

He is the namesake of the William Froude Medal, awarded annually by the Royal Institution of Naval Architects to "an individual who has made a conspicuous contribution to naval architecture and/or shipbuilding".

== Works ==
- On the rolling of Ships. Parker, Son and Bourn. 1862.
- "The Laws of Fluid Resistance". Science Lectures at South Kensington. Vol. II. London: Macmillan & Company. 1879. pp. 88–121.

== See also ==
- Antiroll tanks
- Blade element theory
- Froude's law of similitude
- Froude number
- Froude efficiency
- Froude's experiments
- Froude–Krylov force
- Propeller theory
- Track transition curve
- Water brake-type absorber

== Sources ==
- Brown, Derek K; Lambert, Andrew. "Froude, William (1810–1879)". Oxford Dictionary of National Biography (online ed.). Oxford University Press. doi:10.1093/ref:odnb/10204. (Subscription, Wikipedia Library access or UK public library membership required.)
