= Fruity =

Fruity may refer to:

== People and fictional characters ==
- Edward Dudley Metcalfe (1887–1957), British Indian Army officer nicknamed "Fruity"
- Fruity, another pseudonym of Australian streamer Loserfruit
- Fruity, a character in the 1992 American film Class Act
- Fruity, a character in the American television series Downtown
- Fruity, a character in the Indian television series Son Pari

== Music ==
- Fruity, a 1974 album by British band Blue Mink
- "Fruity", a 2017 song by South Korean singer Hyolyn
- "Fruity", a 2022 song by American singer Chloe Moriondo

== Other uses ==
- Fruity (slang), a pejorative description for a gay man

== See also ==
- Fruit (disambiguation)
- Frooties, a variety of Tootsie Roll
- The Fruitties, a 1990s Spanish-French television series
