= Froot (disambiguation) =

Froot is a 2015 album by Marina and the Diamonds.

Froot may also refer to:

- "Froot" (song), title track of the Marina and the Diamonds album
- Dan Froot, American saxophonist
- Froot (car), the front boot of a vehicle

== See also ==
- Fruit
- Froot Loops
- F-root, one of the root name servers
- fRoots, a music magazine
