= Robert Edmund Froude =

British engineer and naval architect

- Born: 22 December 1846; Devonshire
- Died: 19 March 1924 (aged 77); Cambridge, Cambridgeshire
- Parent(s): William Froude, Catherine Henrietta Elizabeth Holdsworth
- Engineering career
- Discipline: Hydrodynamics
- Institutions: Admiralty Experiment Works
- Significant advance: Momentum theory
- Awards: Legum Doctor (Glasgow University), Fellow of the Royal Society (1924)

Robert Edmund Froude CB FRS (/ˈfruːd/; 22 December 1846 – 19 March 1924) (frequently styled in publication as R. E. Froude) was an English engineer, hydrodynamicist and naval architect who described momentum theory, both used in the systematic evaluation of propeller design efficiency and as components of blade element momentum theory.

== Biography ==
Robert became assistant to his father William Froude in 1871, whose research into hydrodynamics resulted in regular commissions issued by the Admiralty. These commissions included the Admiralty Experiment Works: a facility of William's conception containing a large test tank at which they tested theories and the physical characteristics of model craft. At this facility, later Admiralty commissions included the testing of warcraft designs. Robert was given the position of Superintendent following his father's death in 1879, with this appointment continuing after the tank division of the Experiment Works was moved to an expanded facility at Haslar.

In 1881, he partnered with Richard Hammersley Heenan, owner of the Woodhouse and Co. engineering company in Newton Heath, Lancashire, to co-found Heenan & Froude Ltd in Birmingham. The company initially produced water brake dynamometers following from his father's design, and later, a range of dynamometers of various types. The Froude name as a trademark has been an element in a number of equity transitions, but remains in existence under the mononym "Froude," a group which comprises Froude, Inc. (USA) and Froude, Ltd. (UK), manufacturers, service providers and validators of dynamometers and other engine and motor test equipment.

Robert Froude also furthered his father's published theoretical work, such as his description of blade element theory, in papers authored to the Royal Institution of Naval Architects. His contributions included: a description of momentum theory; methods by which quantified propeller screw geometry could be examined; the main parameters which govern the efficiency of propeller screw designs, including the relationship between the propeller and the geometry of the boat's hull; and the formulae by which these data could be used to optimise designs predictively. Owing to their utility, blade element theory and momentum theory would later be unified within the more comprehensive blade element momentum theory. In 1905 he was elected as an honorary Vice President of the Institution.
