= Momentum theory =

Mathematical model in fluid dynamics

An actuator disk accelerating a fluid flow from right to left

In fluid dynamics, momentum theory or disk actuator theory is a theory describing a mathematical model of an ideal actuator disk, such as a propeller or helicopter rotor, by W.J.M. Rankine (1865), Alfred George Greenhill (1888) and Robert Edmund Froude (1889).

The rotor is modeled as an infinitely thin disc, inducing a constant velocity along the axis of rotation. The basic state of a helicopter is hovering. This disc creates a flow around the rotor. Under certain mathematical premises of the fluid, there can be extracted a mathematical connection between power, radius of the rotor, torque and induced velocity. Friction is not included.

For a stationary open rotor with no outer duct, such as a helicopter in hover, the power required to produce a given thrust is:

$$P = \sqrt{\frac{T^3}{2 \rho A}}$$

where:

- T is the thrust
- $\rho$ is the density of air (or other medium)
- A is the area of the rotor disc
- P is power

A device which converts the translational energy of the fluid into rotational energy of the axis or vice versa is called a Rankine disk actuator. The real life implementations of such devices include marine and aviation propellers, windmills, helicopter rotors, centrifugal pumps, wind turbines, turbochargers and chemical agitators.

== See also ==
- Blade element theory
- Circulation (fluid dynamics)
- Disk loading
- Kutta–Joukowski theorem
