= VPP =

VPP may refer to:

== Organisations ==
- Vanuatu Presidential Party, a political party in Vanuatu
- Vermont Progressive Party, third party based in Vermont, United States
- Vietnam Populist Party, a Vietnamese illegal party
- Veterans and People's Party, a minor political party in the United Kingdom
- Volunteer Political Party, a short-lived loyalist political party in Northern Ireland
- Venture Philanthropy Partners, a philanthropic organization in the Washington metropolitan area

== Technology and engineering ==
- Vaginal photoplethysmograph, arousal measuring device
- Variable-pitch propeller (disambiguation), a type of propeller used in aircraft and ships
- Velocity prediction program, velocity prediction program
- Vector Packet Processing technology, software that provides network switch/router functionality
- Virtual Party Protocol, an SMC protocol
- Virtual Power Plant, a cluster of distributed energy generation installations controlled by a central entity
- Voltage peak-to-peak (Vpp), in electronics

== Other uses ==
- Verbal Plenary Preservation
- Virtual Presence Post, an e-consulate run by the US Department of State
- Volumetric Production Payment, a form of financing
- Voluntary Protection Program, a safety management program administered by OSHA in the US
