= Propeller (aeronautics) =

Aircraft propulsion component

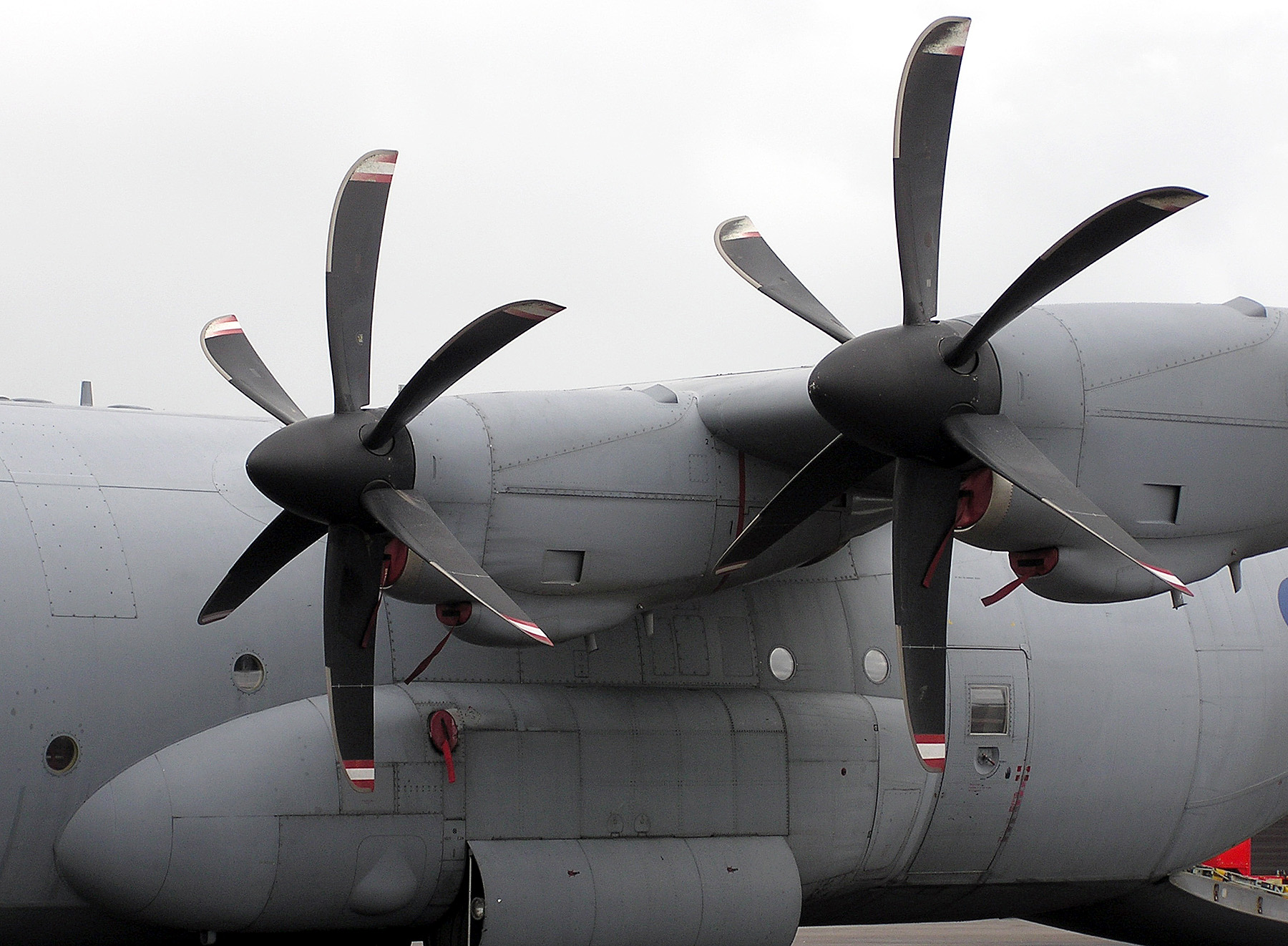
The six-blade turboprop propellers on an RAF C-130J Super Hercules military transport aircraft

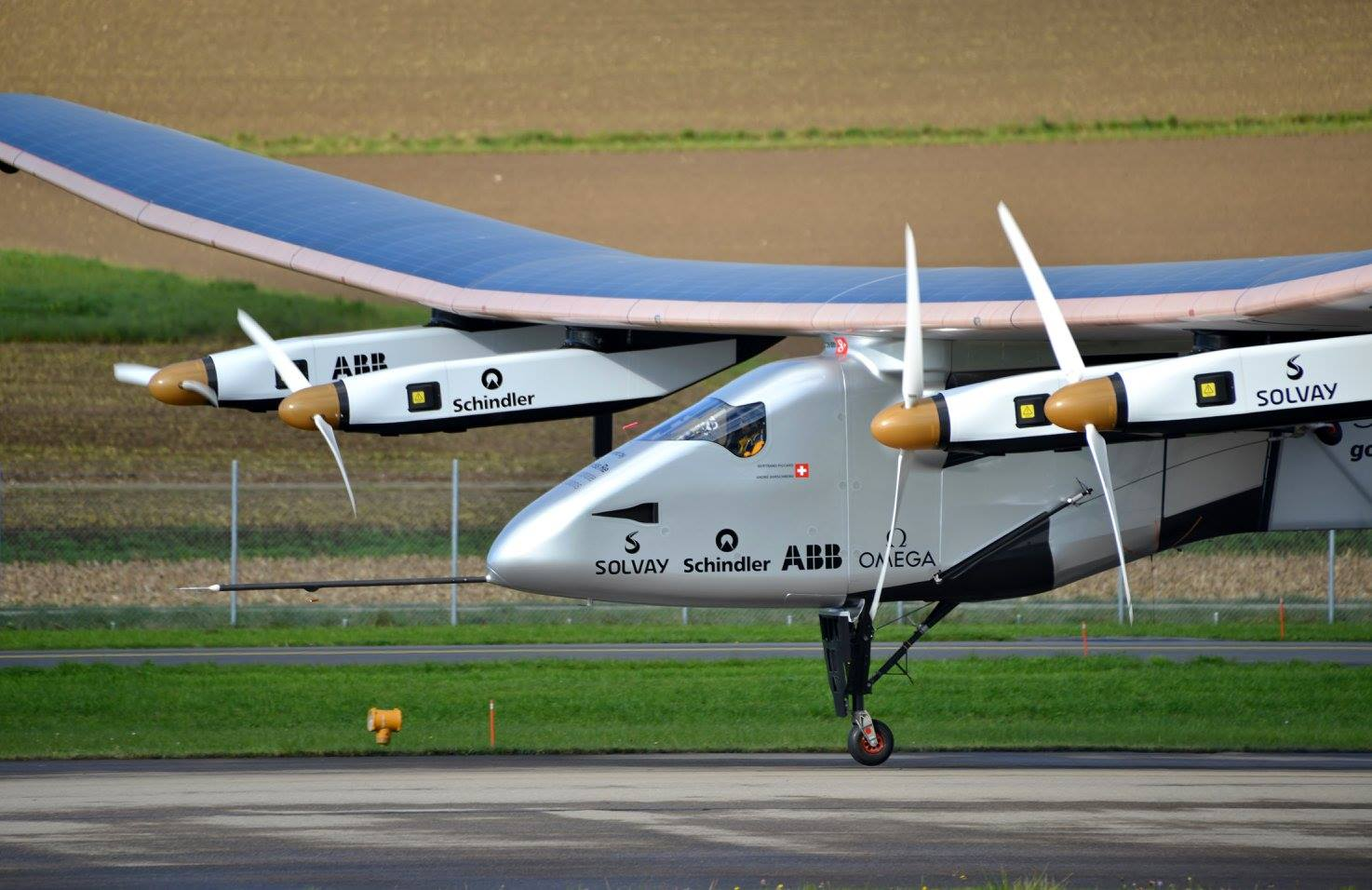
Solar Impulse 2, the first solar-powered aircraft to circumnavigate the world, is powered by four electric motor-driven twin-blade propellers

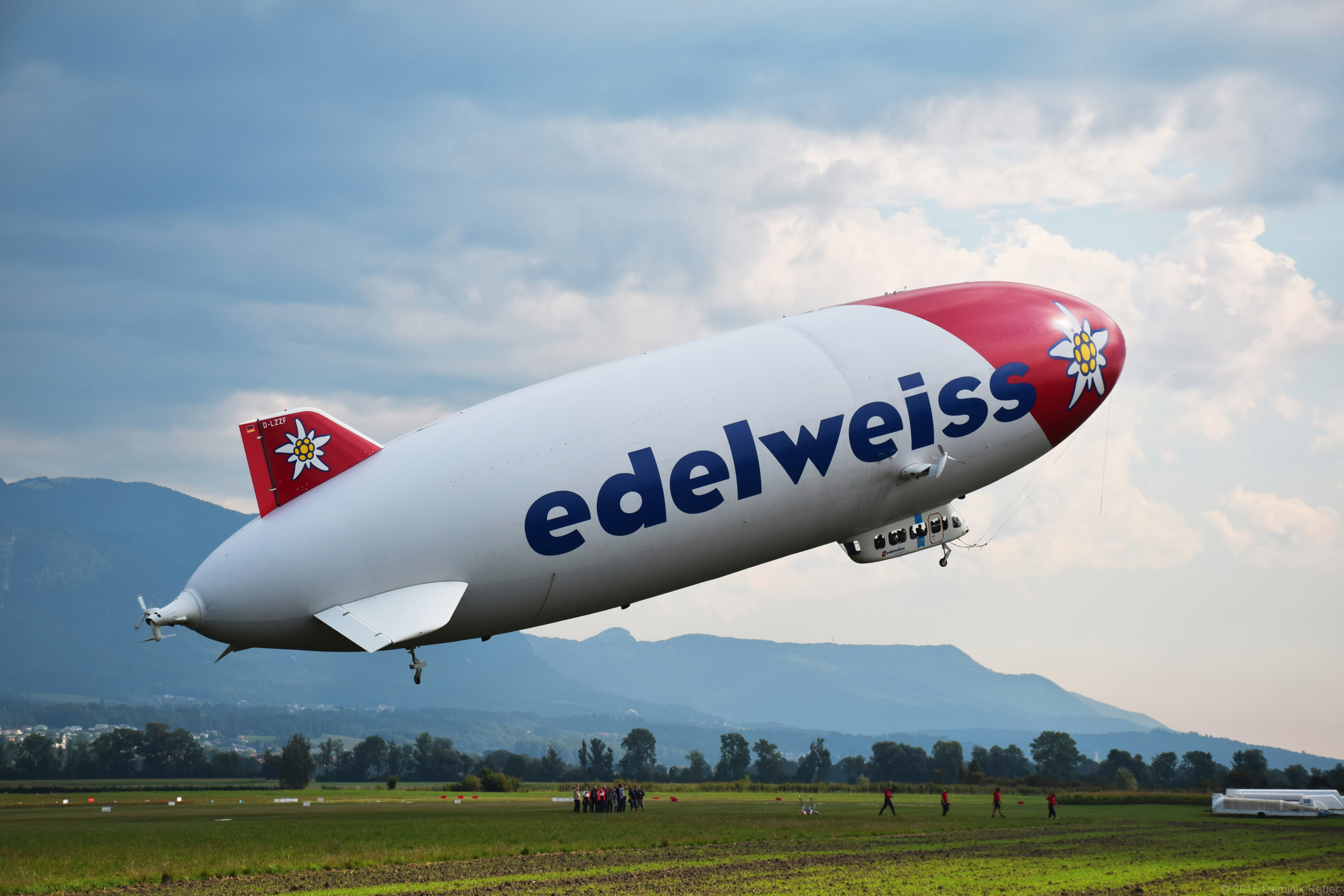
An Edelweiss Air Zeppelin NT airship taking off using thrust vectoring from its trio of tiltrotor propellers

In aeronautics, an aircraft propeller, also called an airscrew, is an aircraft propulsion device that converts rotary motion from an engine or other power source into a swirling slipstream that generates thrust. A typical propeller engine comprises the motor driving a rotating shaft (driveshaft), to which several radial airfoil-section blades are attached, so that the whole blade assembly (i.e. the propeller) rotates around an axis of rotation longitudinal to the direction of travel. The propeller blades, which can be made from wood, metal or composite materials, attaches to the driveshaft either directly or through reduction gearing, and the blade pitch may be fixed, manually variable to a few set positions, or of the automatically variable "constant-speed" type.

Propeller-driven fixed-wing aircraft are the earliest type of powered heavier-than-air aircraft (i.e. aerodynes), with the Wright Flyer (which used two push propellers powered by a chain drive gasoline engine) being the first-ever manned fixed-wing aircraft to achieve sustained flight. In addition to conventional shaft engine propeller aircraft, almost all human- and solar-powered aircraft, as well as some lighter-than-air aircraft (i.e. powered airships), also use propellers to sustain and/or to steer flight. Tiltrotor/tiltwing aircraft can use a rotatable nacelle/wing mechanism to turn a rotorwing (which generates lift for vertical takeoff and landing) from a vertical axis to a horizontal one, which converts the rotorwing into a functional propeller — sometimes referred to as a proprotor. Propeller engines are typically only capable of subsonic airspeeds, generally below about 480 mph (770 km/h), although a transonic speed of Mach 1.01 was recorded in a dive by the McDonnell XF-88B experimental propeller-equipped aircraft, with a propeller efficiency of 78%.

Propeller aircraft, since their debut in 1903, played a dominant role in aviation of the first half of the 20th century and in the aerial theaters of both World Wars, until the advent of the much faster and heavier-payload jet aircraft began supplanting them after the end of the Second World War. Nevertheless, propeller engines remain popular among light/ultralight aircraft in recreational and utility general aviation, while gas turbine-powered turboprop engines are used in commercial aviation for regional air travel, freight and aeromedical services, as well as by the military for low-intensity aerial tasks that warrant low-airspeed/altitude loitering or simply do not require fast airspeeds, such as tactical airlift, early warning and control, maritime patrol/anti-submarine warfare, electronic warfare and even gunship/close air support operations.

== History ==
=== Early designs ===
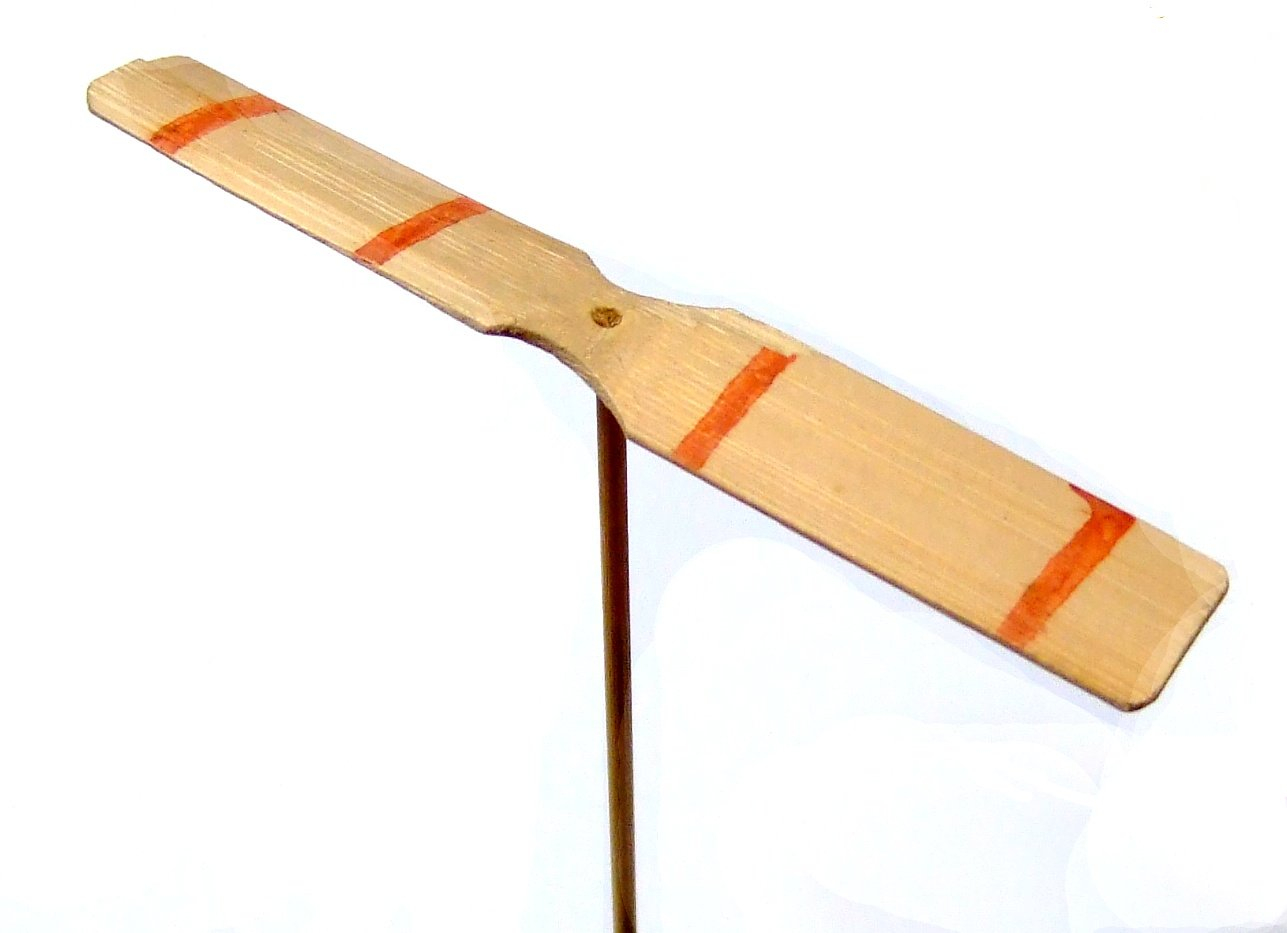
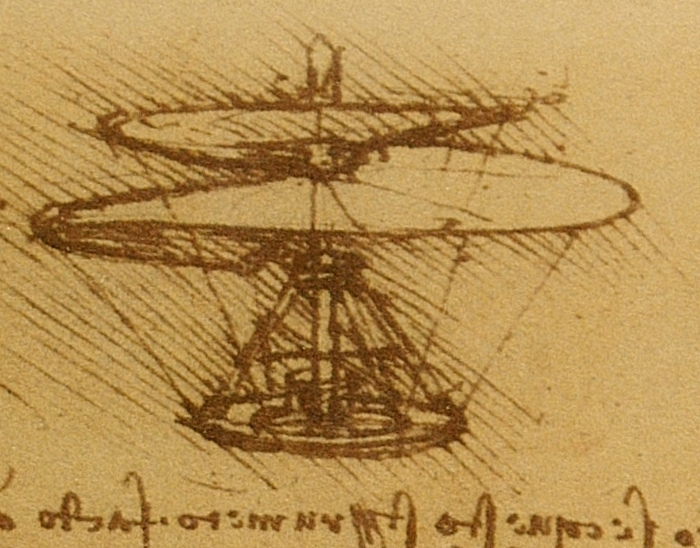
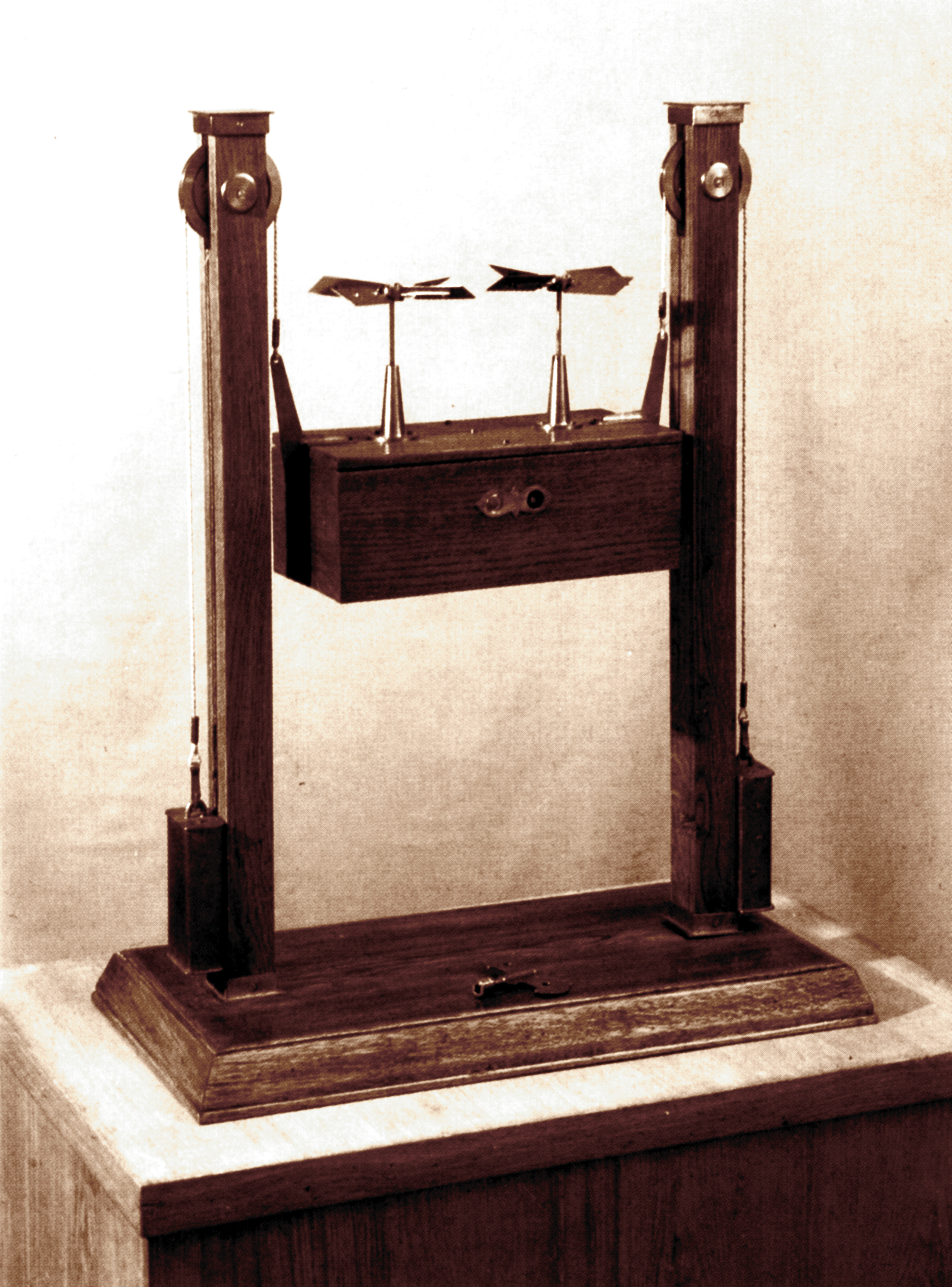
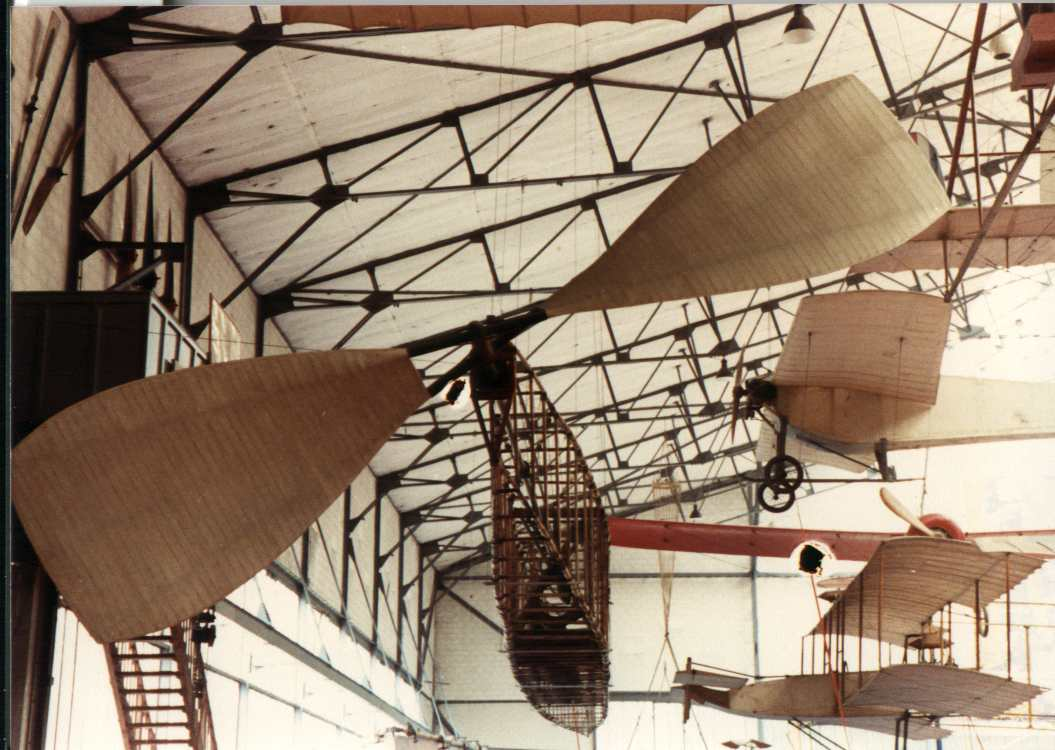
Early propeller designs. Top to bottom, left to right: the bamboo-copter, an ancient East Asian toy (c. 400 BC); Leonardo da Vinci's hypothetical aerial screw (1490s); Mikhail Lomonosov's aerodynamic machine (1754); airscrew of the dirigible La France, the world's first fully maneuverable aircraft (1884)

The earliest references for vertical flight came from China. Since around 400 BC, Chinese children have played with bamboo flying toys. This bamboo-copter is spun by rolling a stick attached to a rotor between one's hands. The spinning creates lift, and the toy flies when released. The 4th-century AD Daoist book Baopuzi by Ge Hong (抱朴子 "Master who Embraces Simplicity") reportedly describes some of the ideas inherent to rotary wing aircraft.

Designs similar to the Chinese helicopter toy appeared in Renaissance paintings and other works.

It was not until the early 1480s, when Leonardo da Vinci created a design for a machine that could be described as an "aerial screw", that any recorded advancement was made towards vertical flight. His notes suggested that he built small flying models, but there were no indications for any provision to stop the rotor from making the craft rotate. As scientific knowledge increased and became more accepted, man continued to pursue the idea of vertical flight. Many of these later models and machines would more closely resemble the ancient bamboo flying top with spinning wings, rather than Leonardo's screw.

In July 1754, Russian Mikhail Lomonosov had developed a small coaxial modeled after the Chinese top but powered by a wound-up spring device and demonstrated it to the Russian Academy of Sciences. It was powered by a spring, and was suggested as a method to lift meteorological instruments. In 1783, Christian de Launoy, and his mechanic, Bienvenu, used a coaxial version of the Chinese top in a model consisting of contrarotating turkey flight feathers as rotor blades, and in 1784, demonstrated it to the French Academy of Sciences. A dirigible airship was described by Jean Baptiste Marie Meusnier presented in 1783. The drawings depict a 260-foot-long (79 m) streamlined envelope with internal ballonets that could be used for regulating lift. The airship was designed to be driven by three propellers. In 1784 Jean-Pierre Blanchard fitted a hand-powered propeller to a balloon, the first recorded means of propulsion carried aloft. Sir George Cayley, influenced by a childhood fascination with the Chinese flying top, developed a model of feathers, similar to that of Launoy and Bienvenu, but powered by rubber bands. By the end of the century, he had progressed to using sheets of tin for rotor blades and springs for power. His writings on his experiments and models would become influential on future aviation pioneers.

William Bland sent designs for his "Atmotic Airship" to the Great Exhibition held in London in 1851, where a model was displayed. This was an elongated balloon with a steam engine driving twin propellers suspended underneath. Alphonse Pénaud developed coaxial rotor model helicopter toys in 1870, also powered by rubber bands. In 1872 Dupuy de Lome launched a large navigable balloon, which was driven by a large propeller turned by eight men. Hiram Maxim built a craft that weighed 3.5 long tons (3.6 t), with a 110 ft (34 m) wingspan that was powered by two 360 hp (270 kW) steam engines driving two propellers. In 1894, his machine was tested with overhead rails to prevent it from rising. The test showed that it had enough lift to take off. One of Pénaud's toys, given as a gift by their father, inspired the Wright brothers to pursue the dream of flight.

=== First modern propellers ===
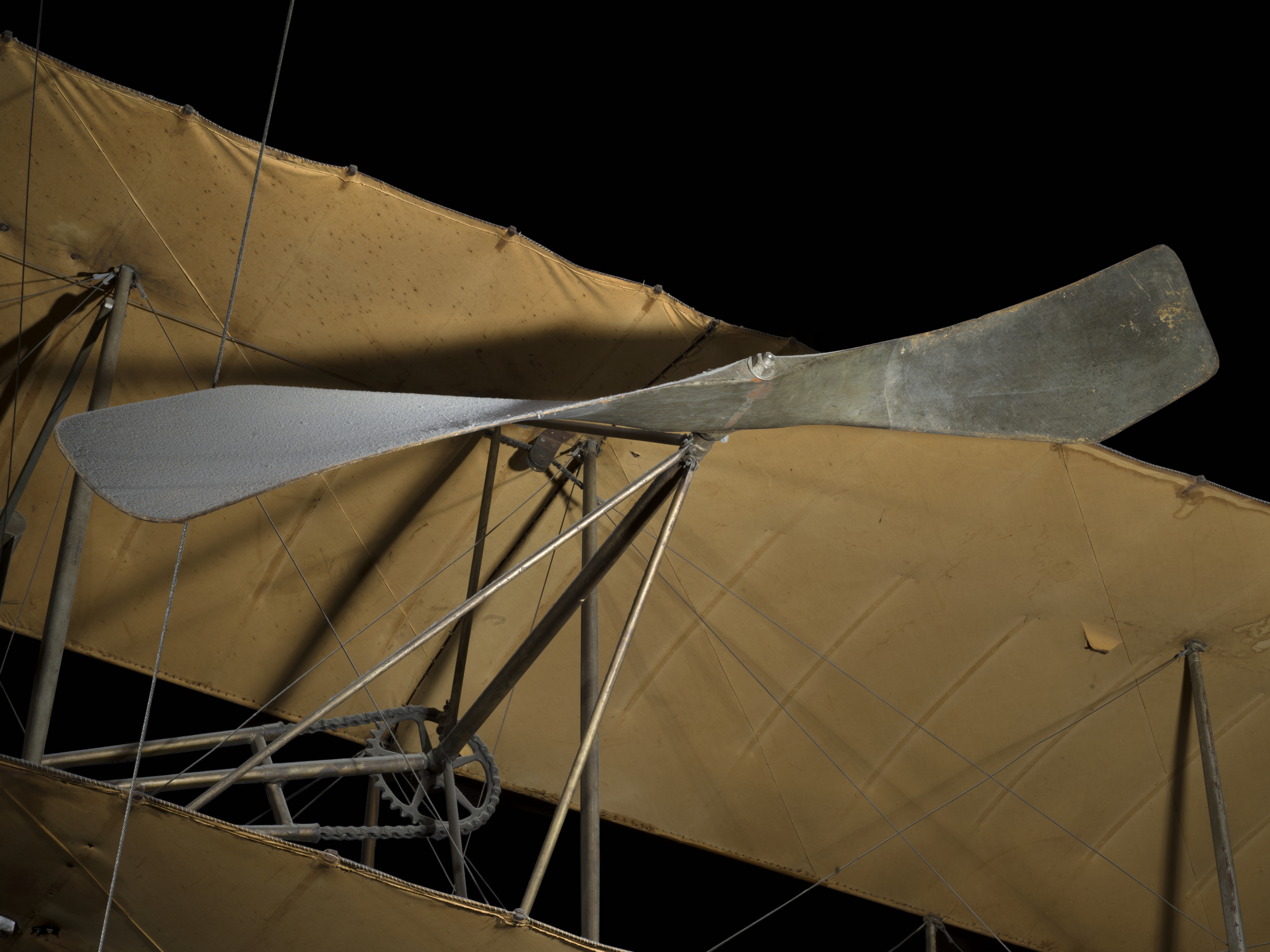
Propeller of the Wright Military Flyer (1909)

The twisted airfoil (aerofoil) shape of an aircraft propeller was pioneered by the Wright brothers. While some earlier engineers had attempted to model air propellers on marine propellers, the Wrights realized that a propeller is essentially the same as a wing, and were able to use data from their earlier wind tunnel experiments on wings, introducing a twist along the length of the blades. This was necessary to maintain a more uniform angle of attack of the blade along its length. Their original propeller blades had an efficiency of about 82%, compared to 90% for a modern (2010) small general aviation propeller, the 3-blade McCauley used on a Beechcraft Bonanza aircraft. Roper quotes 90% for a propeller for a human-powered aircraft.

Mahogany was the wood preferred for propellers through World War I, but wartime shortages encouraged use of walnut, oak, cherry and ash. Alberto Santos Dumont was another early pioneer, having designed propellers before the Wright Brothers for his airships. He applied the knowledge he gained from experiences with airships to make a propeller with a steel shaft and aluminium blades for his 14 bis biplane in 1906. Some of his designs used a bent aluminium sheet for blades, thus creating an airfoil shape. They were heavily undercambered, and this plus the absence of lengthwise twist made them less efficient than the Wright propellers. Even so, this was perhaps the first use of aluminium in the construction of an airscrew. Originally, a rotating airfoil behind the aircraft, which pushes it, was called a propeller, while one which pulled from the front was a tractor. Later the term 'pusher' became adopted for the rear-mounted device in contrast to the tractor configuration and both became referred to as 'propellers' or 'airscrews'. The understanding of low speed propeller aerodynamics was fairly complete by the 1920s, but later requirements to handle more power in a smaller diameter have made the problem more complex.

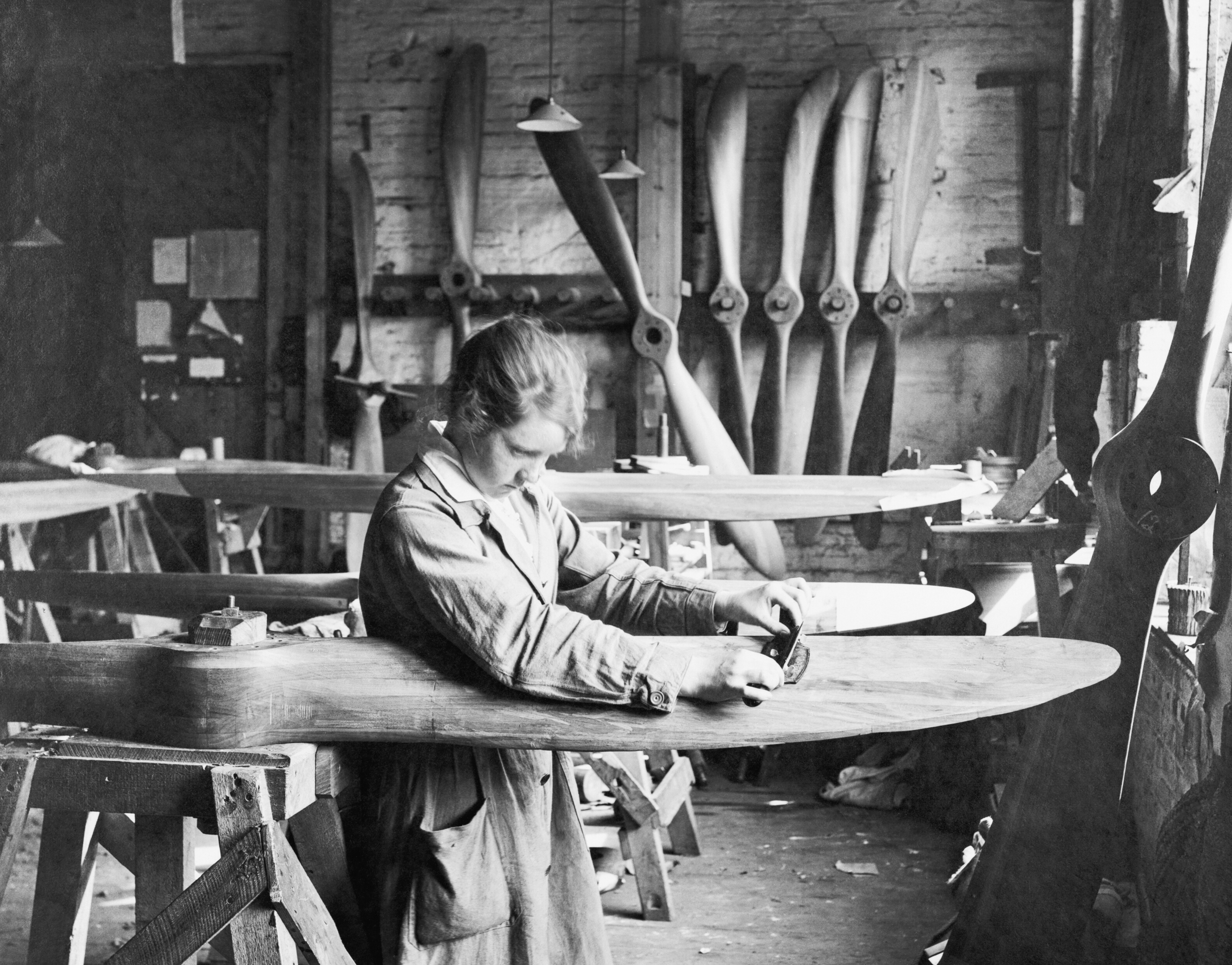
A worker manufacturing propellers during World War I

Propeller research for National Advisory Committee for Aeronautics (NACA) was directed by William F. Durand from 1916. Parameters measured included propeller efficiency, thrust developed, and power absorbed. While a propeller may be tested in a wind tunnel, its performance in free-flight might differ. At the Langley Memorial Aeronautical Laboratory, E. P. Leslie used Vought VE-7s with Wright E-4 engines for data on free-flight, while Durand used reduced size, with similar shape, for wind tunnel data. Their results were published in 1926 as NACA report #220.

== Theory and design ==
A 6-bladed Hamilton Standard 568F propeller, turning at 1200 rpm, on an ATR 72 short-haul airliner. Its driving turbine speed is 20,000 rpm.

Lowry quotes a propeller efficiency of about 73.5% at cruise for a Cessna 172. This is derived from his "Bootstrap approach" for analyzing the performance of light general aviation aircraft using fixed pitch or constant speed propellers. The efficiency of the propeller is influenced by the angle of attack (α). This is defined as α = Φ - θ, where θ is the helix angle (the angle between the resultant relative velocity and the blade rotation direction) and Φ is the blade pitch angle. Very small pitch and helix angles give a good performance against resistance but provide little thrust, while larger angles have the opposite effect. The best helix angle is when the blade is acting as a wing producing much more lift than drag. However, 'lift-and-drag' is only one way to express the aerodynamic force on the blades. To explain aircraft and engine performance the same force is expressed slightly differently in terms of thrust and torque since the required output of the propeller is thrust. Thrust and torque are the basis of the definition for the efficiency of the propeller as shown below. The advance ratio of a propeller is similar to the angle of attack of a wing.

A propeller's efficiency is determined by

$$\eta = \frac{\hbox{propulsive power out}}{\hbox{shaft power in}} = \frac{\hbox{thrust}\cdot\hbox{axial speed}}{\hbox{resistance torque}\cdot\hbox{rotational speed}}.$$

Propellers are similar in aerofoil section to a low-drag wing and as such are poor in operation when at other than their optimum angle of attack. Therefore, most propellers use a variable pitch mechanism to alter the blades' pitch angle as engine speed and aircraft velocity are changed.

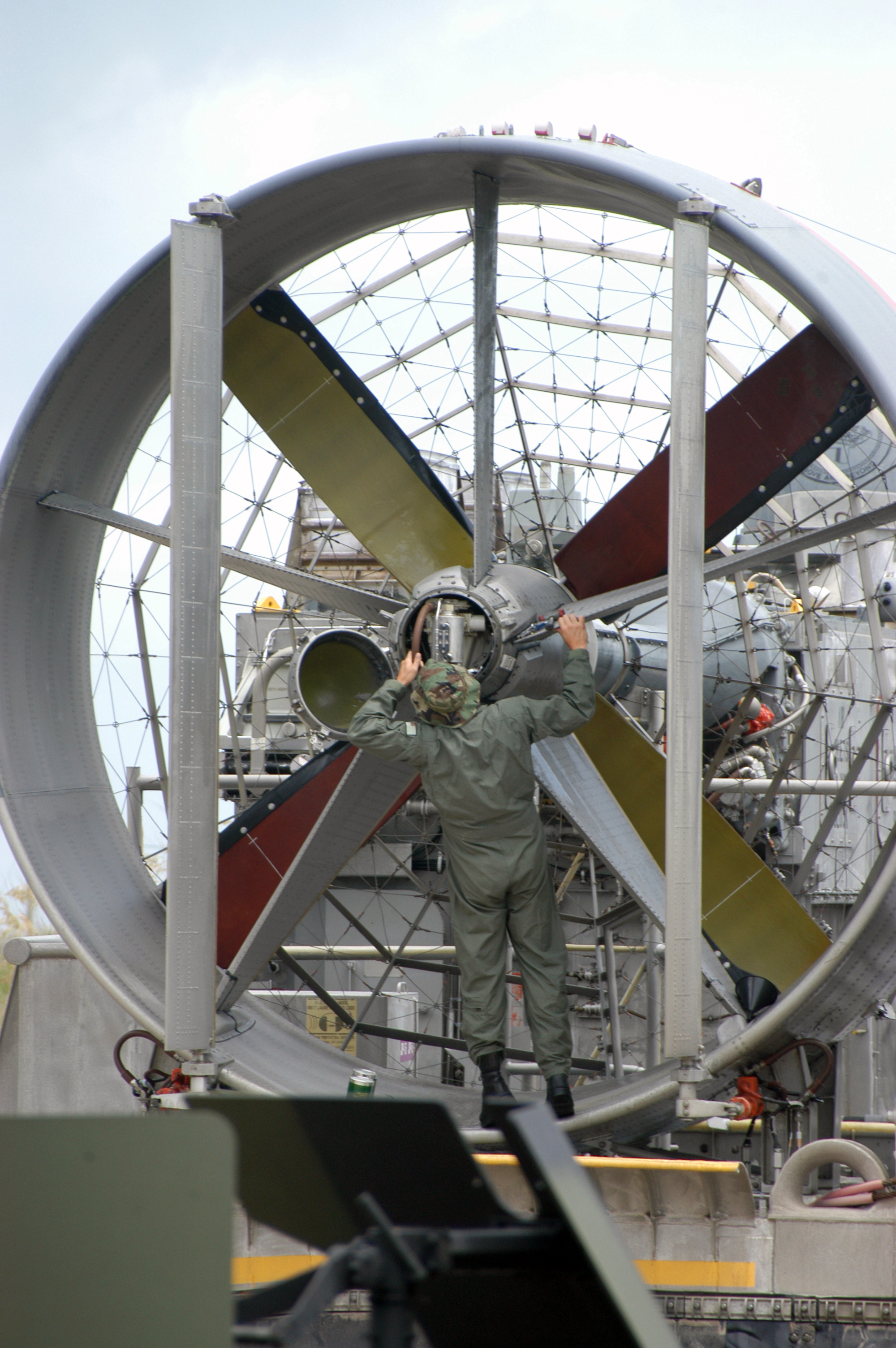
A sailor checks the propeller of a Landing Craft Air Cushion hovercraft

A further consideration is the number and the shape of the blades used. Increasing the aspect ratio of the blades reduces drag but the amount of thrust produced depends on blade area, so using high-aspect blades can result in an excessive propeller diameter. A further balance is that using a smaller number of blades reduces interference effects between the blades, but to have sufficient blade area to transmit the available power within a set diameter means a compromise is needed. Increasing the number of blades also decreases the amount of work each blade is required to perform, limiting the local Mach number – a significant performance limit on propellers. The performance of a propeller suffers when transonic flow first appears on the tips of the blades. As the relative air speed at any section of a propeller is a vector sum of the aircraft speed and the tangential speed due to rotation, the flow over the blade tip will reach transonic speed well before the aircraft does. When the airflow over the tip of the blade reaches its critical speed, drag and torque resistance increase rapidly and shock waves form creating a sharp increase in noise.

=== Blade twist ===
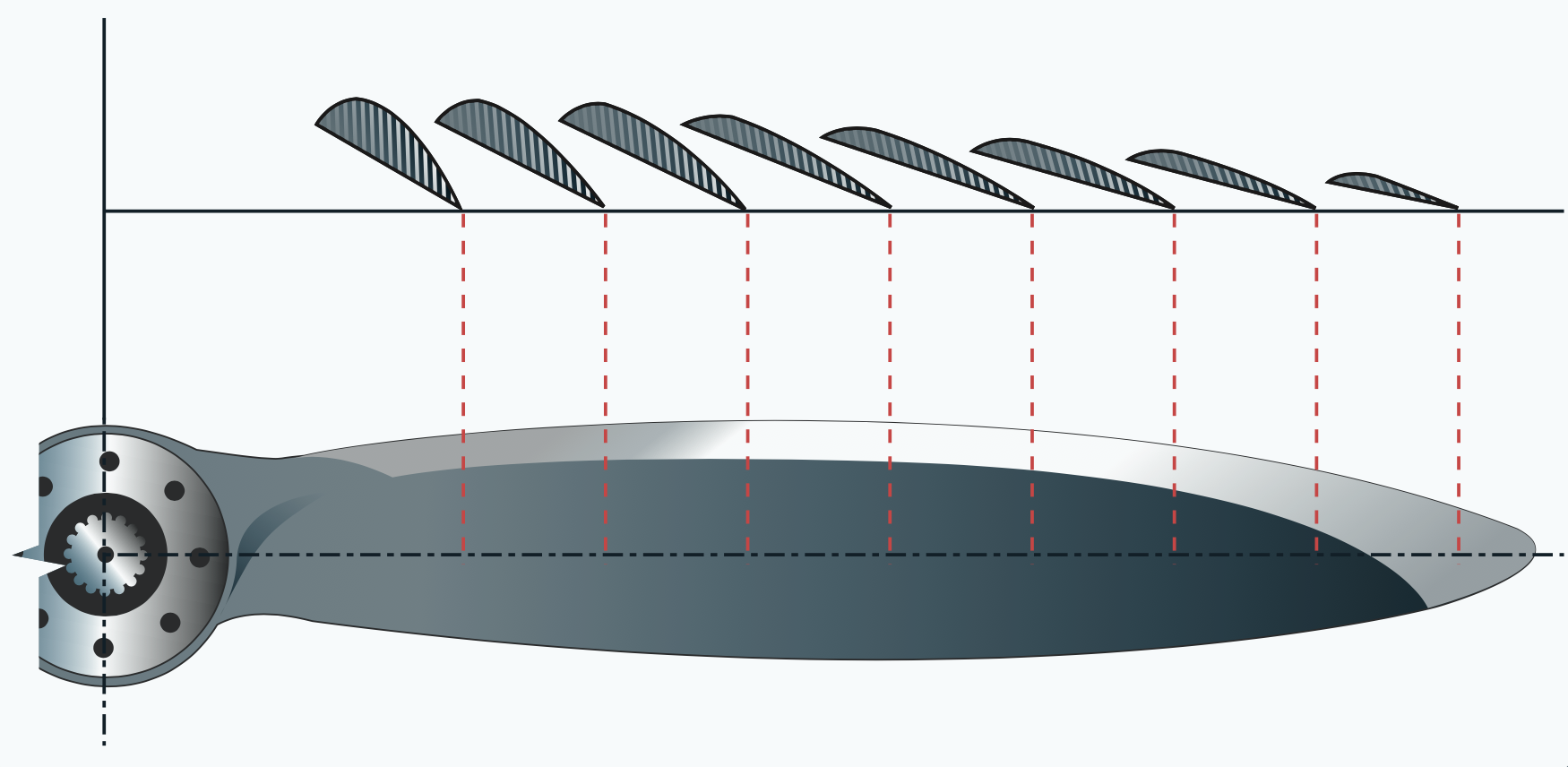
Changes in propeller blade angle from hub to tip.

The tip of a propeller blade travels faster than the hub. Therefore, it is necessary for the blade to be twisted so as to decrease the angle of attack of the blade gradually and therefore produce uniform lift from the hub to the tip. The greatest angle of incidence, or the highest pitch, is at the hub while the smallest angle of incidence or smallest pitch is at the tip. A propeller blade designed with the same angle of incidence throughout its entire length would be inefficient because as airspeed increases in flight, the portion near the hub would have a negative AOA while the blade tip would be stalled.

=== High speed ===
There have been efforts to develop propellers and propfans for aircraft at high subsonic speeds. The 'fix' is similar to that of transonic wing design. Thin blade sections are used and the blades are swept back in a scimitar shape (scimitar propeller) in a manner similar to wing sweepback, so as to delay the onset of shockwaves as the blade tips approach the speed of sound. The maximum relative velocity is kept as low as possible by careful control of pitch to allow the blades to have large helix angles. More blades are used to reduce the work per blade and so circulation strength. Contra-rotating propellers are used. The propellers designed are more efficient than turbo-fans and their cruising speed (Mach 0.7–0.85) is suitable for airliners, but the noise generated is extremely high (see the Antonov An-70 and Tupolev Tu-95 for examples of such a design).

=== Physics ===
Forces acting on the blades of an aircraft propeller include the following. Some of these forces can be arranged to counteract each other, reducing the overall mechanical stresses imposed.

Thrust bending
Thrust loads on the blades, in reaction to the force pushing the air backwards, act to bend the blades forward. Blades are therefore often raked forwards, such that the outward centrifugal force of rotation acts to bend them backwards, thus balancing out the bending effects.
Centrifugal and aerodynamic twisting
A centrifugal twisting force is experienced by any asymmetrical spinning object. In the propeller it acts to twist the blades to a fine pitch. The aerodynamic centre of pressure is therefore usually arranged to be slightly forward of its mechanical centreline, creating a twisting moment towards coarse pitch and counteracting the centrifugal moment. However in a high-speed dive the aerodynamic force can change significantly and the moments can become unbalanced.
Centrifugal
The force felt by the blades acting to pull them away from the hub when turning. It can be arranged to help counteract the thrust bending force, as described above.
Torque bending
Air resistance acting against the blades, combined with inertial effects causes propeller blades to bend away from the direction of rotation.
Vibratory
Many types of disturbance set up vibratory forces in blades. These include aerodynamic excitation as the blades pass close to the wing and fuselage. Piston engines introduce torque impulses which may excite vibratory modes of the blades and cause fatigue failures. Torque impulses are not present when driven by a gas turbine engine.

== Variable pitch ==
The purpose of varying pitch angle is to maintain an optimal angle of attack for the propeller blades, giving maximum efficiency throughout the flight regime. This reduces fuel usage. Only by maximising propeller efficiency at high speeds can the highest possible speed be achieved. Effective angle of attack decreases as airspeed increases, so a coarser pitch is required at high airspeeds.

The requirement for pitch variation is shown by the propeller performance during the Schneider Trophy competition in 1931. The Fairey Aviation Company fixed-pitch propeller used was partially stalled on take-off and up to 160 mph (260 km/h) on its way up to a top speed of 407.5 mph (655.8 km/h). The very wide speed range was achieved because some of the usual requirements for aircraft performance did not apply. There was no compromise on top-speed efficiency, the take-off distance was not restricted to available runway length and there was no climb requirement.

The variable pitch blades used on the Tupolev Tu-95 propel it at a speed exceeding the maximum once considered possible for a propeller-driven aircraft using an exceptionally coarse pitch.

=== Mechanisms ===
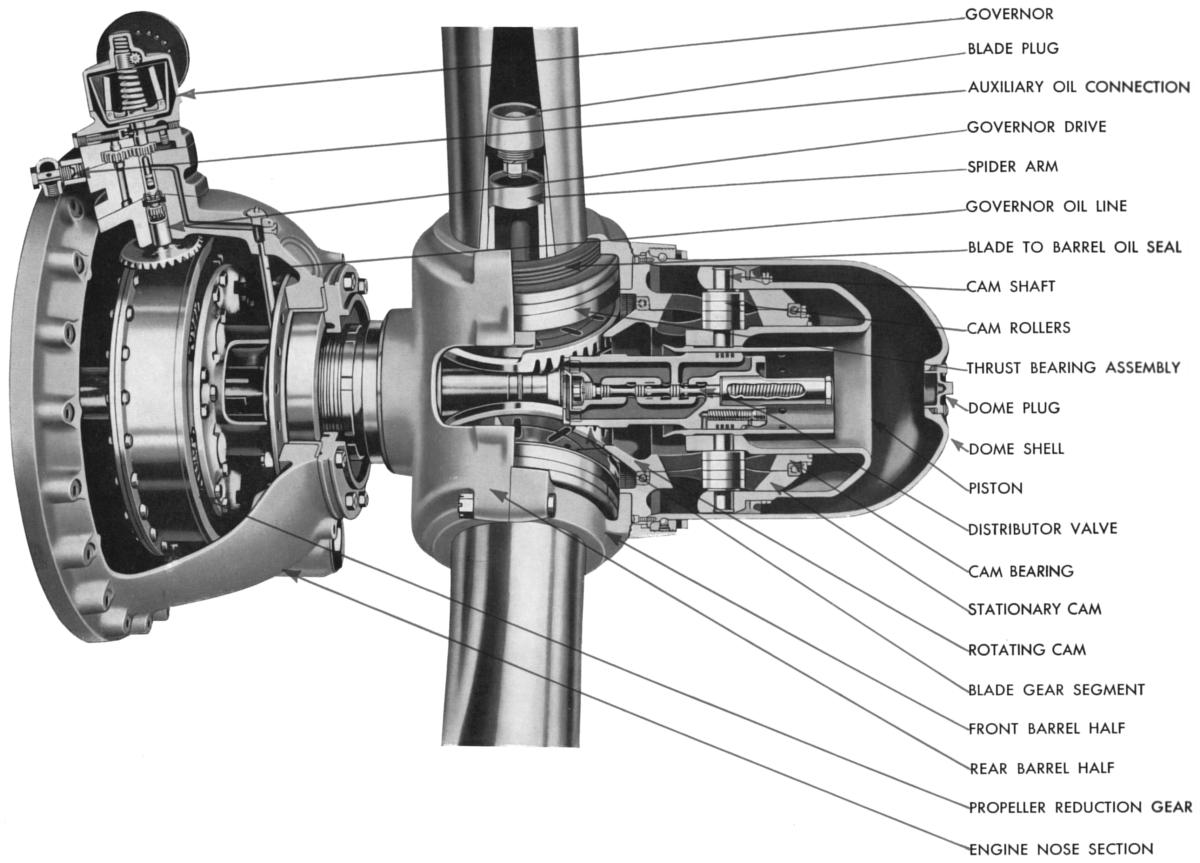
Cut-away view of a Hamilton Standard propeller. This type of constant-speed propeller was used on many American fighters, bombers and transport aircraft of World War II

Early pitch control settings were pilot operated, either with a small number of preset positions or continuously variable.

The simplest mechanism is the ground-adjustable propeller, which may be adjusted on the ground, but is effectively a fixed-pitch prop once airborne. The spring-loaded "two-speed" VP prop is set to fine for takeoff, and then triggered to coarse once in cruise, the propeller remaining coarse for the remainder of the flight.

After World War I, automatic propellers were developed to maintain an optimum angle of attack. This was done by balancing the centripetal twisting moment on the blades and a set of counterweights against a spring and the aerodynamic forces on the blade. Automatic props had the advantage of being simple, lightweight, and requiring no external control, but a particular propeller's performance was difficult to match with that of the aircraft's power plant.

The most common variable pitch propeller is the constant-speed propeller. This is controlled by a hydraulic constant speed unit (CSU). It automatically adjusts the blade pitch in order to maintain a constant engine speed for any given power control setting. Constant-speed propellers allow the pilot to set a rotational speed according to the need for maximum engine power or maximum efficiency, and a propeller governor acts as a closed-loop controller to vary propeller pitch angle as required to maintain the selected engine speed. In most aircraft this system is hydraulic, with engine oil serving as the hydraulic fluid. However, electrically controlled propellers were developed during World War II and saw extensive use on military aircraft, and have recently seen a revival in use on home-built aircraft.

Another design is the V-Prop, which is self-powering and self-governing.

=== Feathering ===
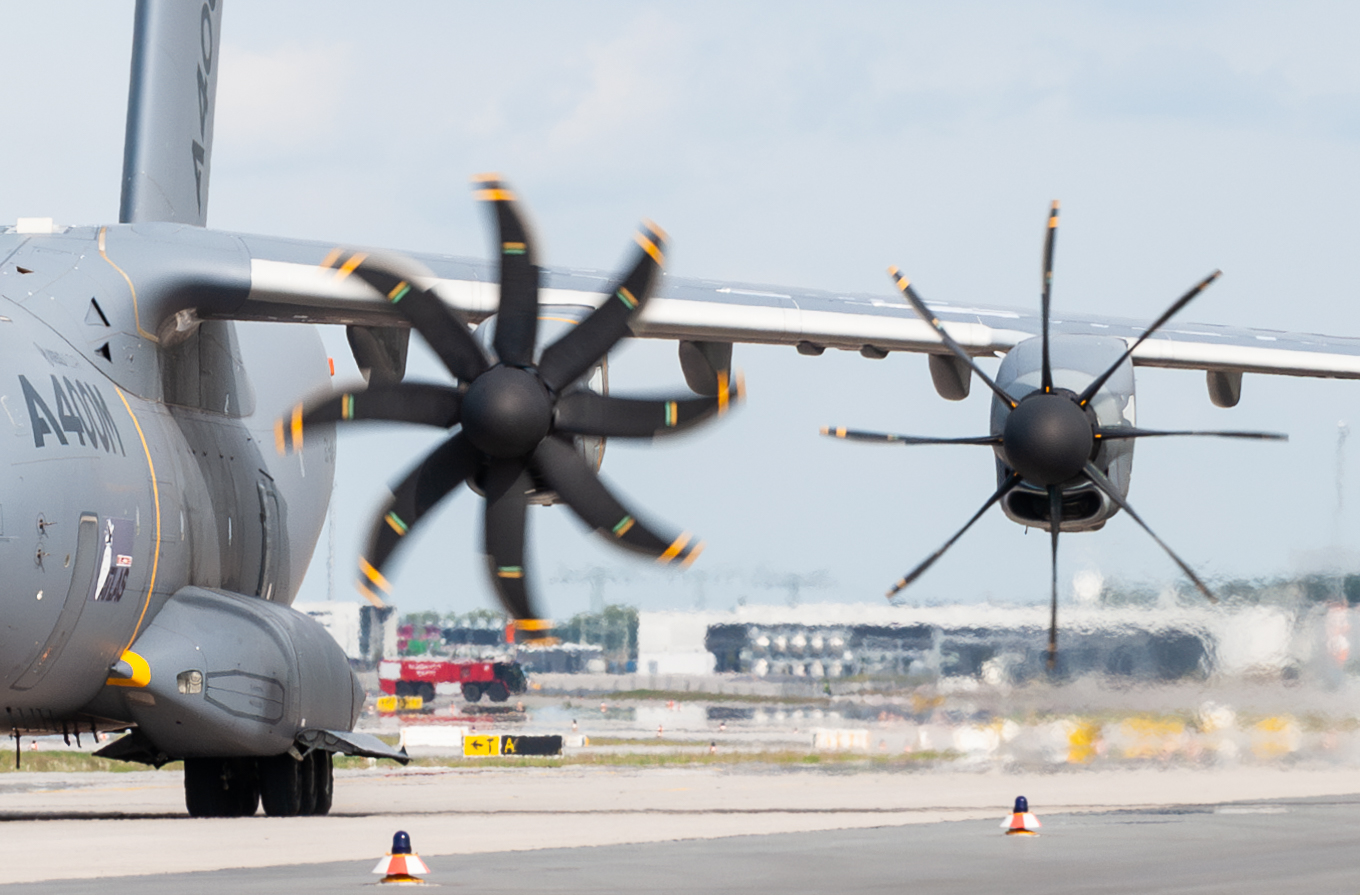
Feathered propeller on the outboard TP400 turboprop of an Airbus A400M

On most variable-pitch propellers, the blades can be rotated parallel to the airflow to stop rotation of the propeller and reduce drag when the engine fails or is deliberately shut down. This is called feathering, a term borrowed from rowing. On single-engined aircraft, whether a powered glider or turbine-powered aircraft, the effect is to increase the gliding distance. On a multi-engine aircraft, feathering the propeller on an inoperative engine reduces drag, and helps the aircraft maintain speed and altitude with the operative engines. Feathering also prevents windmilling, the turning of engine components by the propeller rotation forced by the slipstream; windmilling can damage the engine, start a fire, or cause structural damage to the aircraft.

Most feathering systems for reciprocating engines sense a drop in oil pressure and move the blades toward the feather position, and require the pilot to pull the propeller control back to disengage the high-pitch stop pins before the engine reaches idle RPM. Turboprop control systems usually use a negative torque sensor in the reduction gearbox, which moves the blades toward feather when the engine is no longer providing power to the propeller. Depending on design, the pilot may have to push a button to override the high-pitch stops and complete the feathering process or the feathering process may be automatic.

Accidental feathering is dangerous and can result in an aerodynamic stall; as seen for example with Yeti Airlines Flight 691 which crashed during approach due to accidental feathering.

=== Reverse pitch ===
The propellers on some aircraft can operate with a negative blade pitch angle, and thus reverse the thrust from the propeller. This is known as Beta Pitch. Reverse thrust is used to help slow the aircraft after landing and is particularly advantageous when landing on a wet runway as wheel braking suffers reduced effectiveness. In some cases reverse pitch allows the aircraft to taxi in reverse – this is particularly useful for getting floatplanes out of confined docks.

== Counter-rotation ==
Counter-rotating propellers

Counter-rotating propellers are sometimes used on twin-engine and multi-engine aircraft with wing-mounted engines. These propellers turn in opposite directions from their counterpart on the other wing to balance out the torque and p-factor effects. They are sometimes referred to as "handed" propellers since there are left hand and right hand versions of each prop.

Generally, the propellers on both engines of most conventional twin-engined aircraft spin clockwise (as viewed from the rear of the aircraft). To eliminate the critical engine problem, counter-rotating propellers usually turn "inwards" towards the fuselage – clockwise on the left engine and counterclockwise on the right – however, there are exceptions (especially during World War II) such as the P-38 Lightning which turned "outwards" (counterclockwise on the left engine and clockwise on the right) away from the fuselage from the WW II years, and the Airbus A400 whose inboard and outboard propellers turn in opposite directions even on the same wing.

== Contra-rotation ==
A contra-rotating propeller or contra-prop places two counter-rotating propellers on concentric drive shafts so that one sits immediately 'downstream' of the other propeller. This provides the benefits of counter-rotating propellers for a single powerplant. The forward propeller provides the majority of the thrust, while the rear propeller also recovers energy lost in the swirling motion of the air in the propeller slipstream. Contra-rotation also increases the ability of a propeller to absorb power from a given engine, without increasing propeller diameter. However the added cost, complexity, weight and noise of the system rarely make it worthwhile and it is only used on high-performance types where ultimate performance is more important than efficiency.

== See also ==
- Advance ratio
- Axial fan design
- Blade element theory
- Blade element momentum theory
- Helicopter rotor
- List of aircraft propeller manufacturers
- Momentum theory
- Charles M. Olmsted, early American "high efficiency" propeller designer (1909)
- Propeller theory
- Turboprop
- Radial-lift rotors
