= Annular lift fan aircraft =

Hover efficiency vs disc loading for different configurations

An annular lift fan aircraft is a conceptual vertical takeoff and landing (VTOL) aircraft that was first systematically and numerically investigated in 2015. This concept was proposed to offer a VTOL solution for both high hovering efficiency and high cruise speed, using a large annular lift fan instead of the relatively small conventional circular lift fans used in the Ryan XV-5 Vertifan and the F-35B Lightning II (JSF).

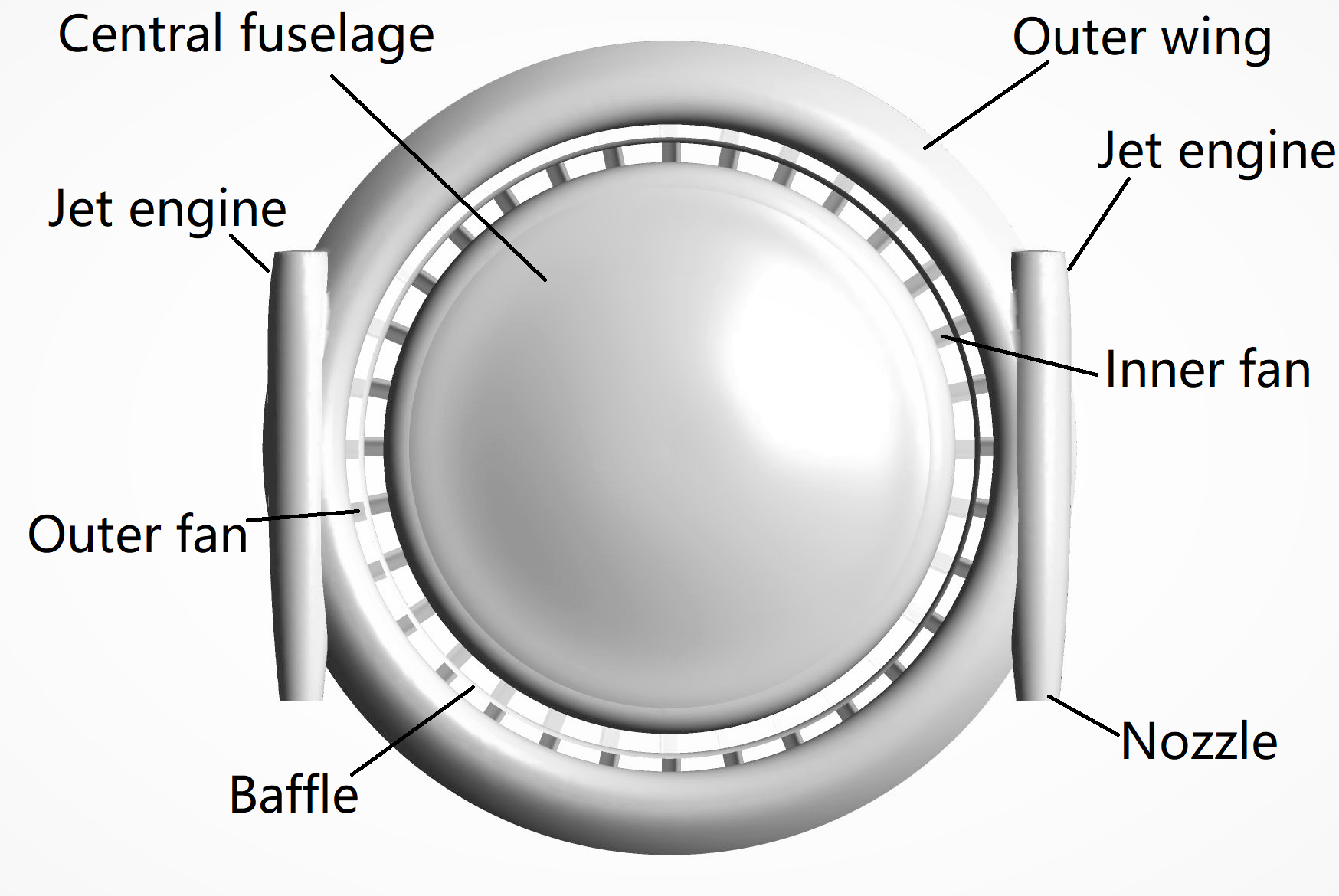
Single-stage lift fan aircraft with an inner fan and an outer fan coupled by the gears in the baffle

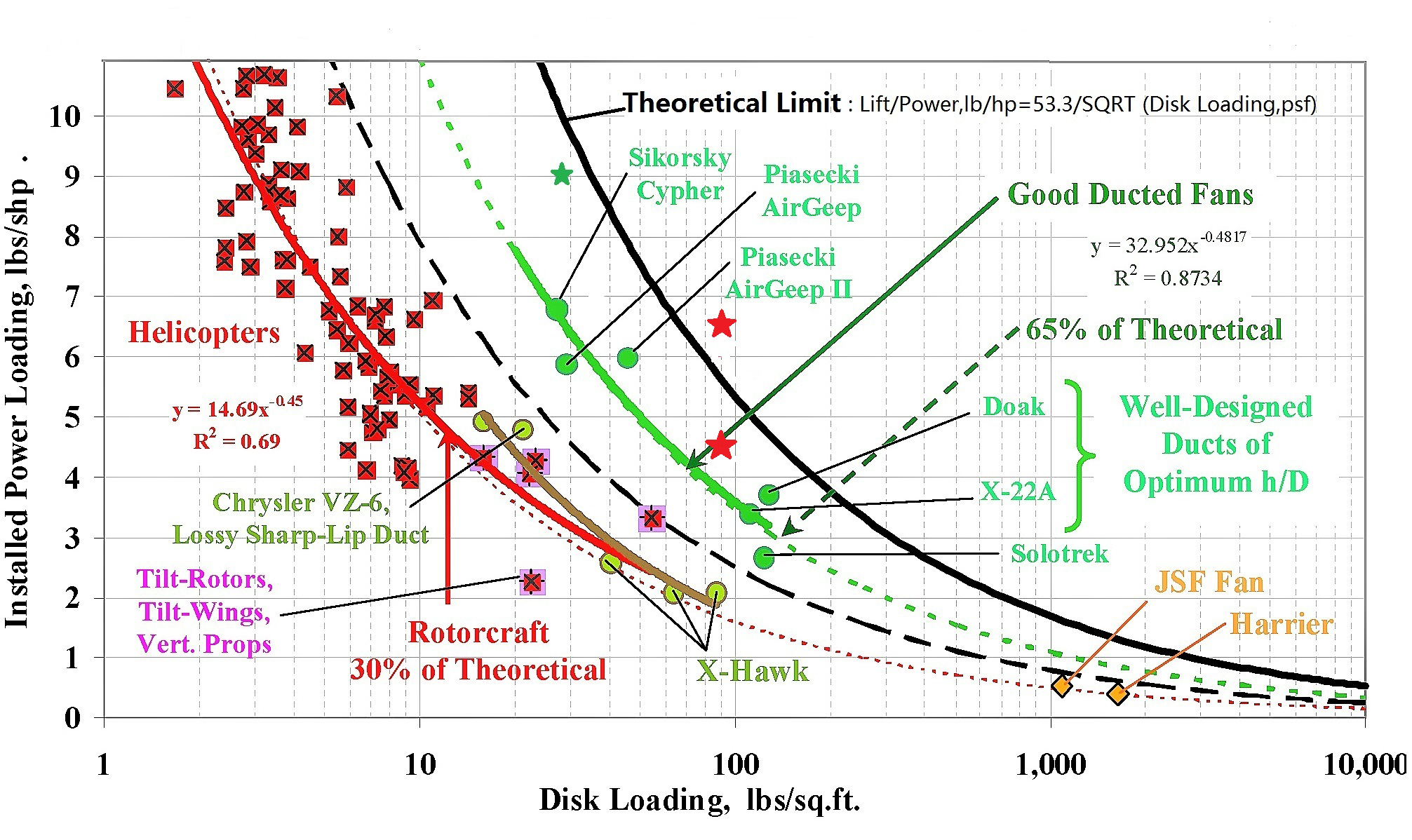
Disc loading vs. power loading for VTOL aircraft

The Ryan XV-5 and the F-35B use relatively smaller lift fans, either fan-in-fuselage or fan-in-wing, with very high disc loading. According to the momentum theory of the ducted fan, high disc loading leads to low hovering efficiency (see power vs disc loadings, JSF fan), so the F-35B can hover for only a short time, at the cost of range and useful load. On the other hand, helicopters apply long rotor blades to achieve low disc loading and high hovering efficiency, but have a limited forward speed of less than 200 knots due to compressibility effects on the rotor blade tips. The tilt rotor concept, found in the V-22 Osprey, uses large-diameter propellers, but also has limited top speed to 300 knots. The tilting ducted fans or shrouded propellers, such as the Doak VZ-4, the Bell X-22, were built in 1950s and 1960s. However, ducts designed for static conditions degraded in performance at high advance ratio, whereas a duct designed for axial cruise could regain good high-speed performance at the expense of static figure of merit. The Doak VZ-4 and the Bell X-22 especially had problems achieving high flight speeds. Therefore, to achieve both high hovering efficiency and high forward speed, the best way is to use a low disc loading lift fan or fans, in addition to turbofans for forward propulsion at cruise speed.

== Hover ==
The annular lift fan concept uses two parallel annular fans counter-rotating about the central fuselage.(see plan view) The two fans are incorporated in an annular duct, separated by a baffle, but coupled by the gears in the baffle to counter-rotate and eliminate torque. During VTOL, the outer fan is driven pneumatically or mechanically by the jet engines in the outer wing. As the annular fan area can be made large enough, low disc loading and high hovering efficiency can be achieved in hover.

According to the CFD simulations, at the disc loading of 28.37 lb/ft^{2}, the maximum power loading of 9.03 lb/hp is achieved,(see power vs disc loadings, green star) very close to the theoretical limit. As the disc loading increased to 91 lb/ft^{2}, the power loading drops to 4.65 lb/hp.(see power vs disc loadings, lower red star) However, when the aircraft is within one aircraft radius to the ground plane, due to very strong ground effect, the power loading increases almost 50% to 6.77 lb/hp,(see power vs disc loadings, higher red star) comparable to helicopters and general aviation aircraft.

During hover and transition, the attitude of the aircraft can be maneuvered by thrust vectoring of the two jet engines, which control yaw, roll, and pitch.(See pitching moment) The differential forward thrust of the two jets controls yaw, and the differential upward thrust controls roll. The addition of two upward thrusts controls pitch. The angles of jet nozzles can be rotated to adjust the forward and upward vectors. Auxiliary jets may be needed to accurately control the attitude.

== Transition ==
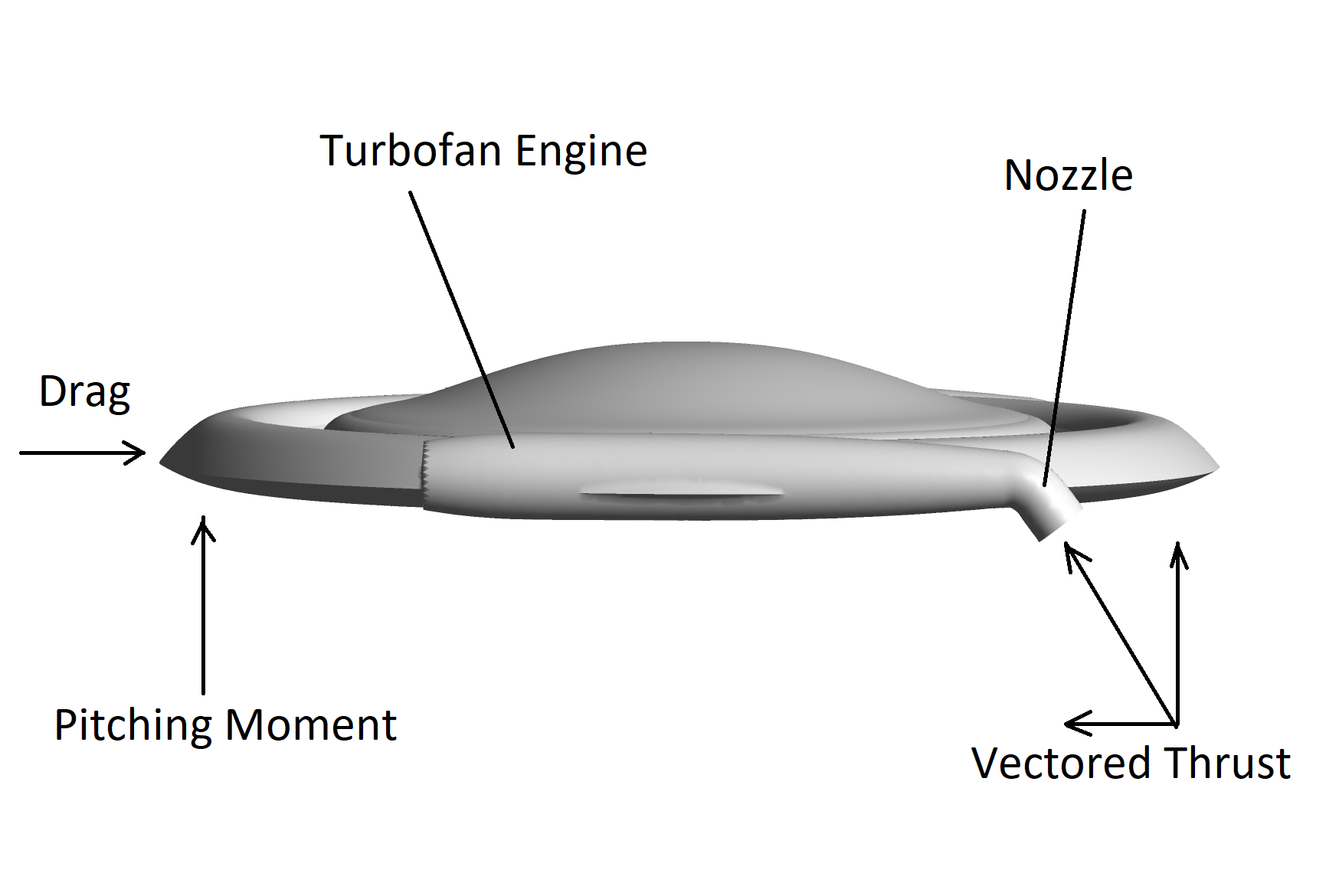
Thrust vectoring for attitude control and to eliminate the pitching moment

The low disc loading annular lift fan system introduces tremendous momentum drag and nose-up pitching moment during the transition from VTOL to cruise. Before the aircraft reaches a speed for sufficient aerodynamic lift, it needs extra power to overcome the momentum drag and nose-up pitching moment.(See pitching moment) According to the CFD simulations, the maximum requirement for jet thrust with the aid of a skirt in transition is 0.448 of the aircraft weight, which can be satisfied by turbofan engines with a thrust-to-weight ratio of 0.3 and an augmentation ratio of 1.6–2.0. The nose-up pitching moment can also be minimized by increasing the area of the fuselage and decreasing the area of the outer wing.

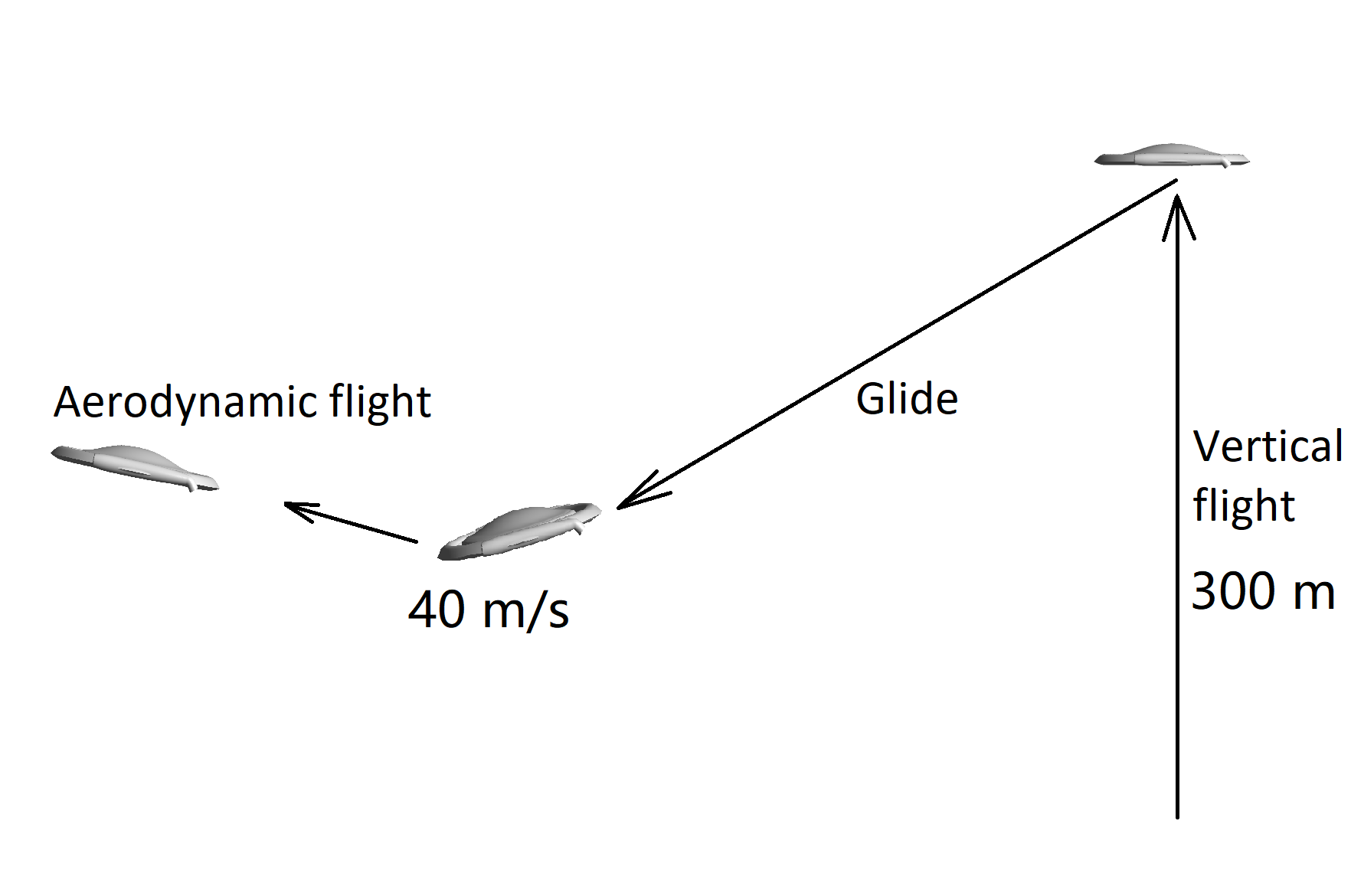
Gliding transition

A special gliding transitional strategy was proposed to reduce the drag and pitching moment. The aircraft starts from a vertical flight, lifting the aircraft to a high altitude. Then, the aircraft begins to glide, with the total lift less than the weight. With the aid of the forward thrust acceleration, the aircraft quickly gains speed to the aerodynamic speed and then changes the angle of attack to 15° to start an aerodynamic flight. Because the fan lift and speed are reduced, the momentum drag and pitching moment are also significantly reduced. The potential energy of the aircraft is transformed to the speed, thus reducing the required forward thrust for acceleration. According to the CFD simulations, the gliding transition strategy reduces the total required thrust by 47% without the need for a skirt. It is also faster, taking only about 20 seconds to complete.

== Cruise ==
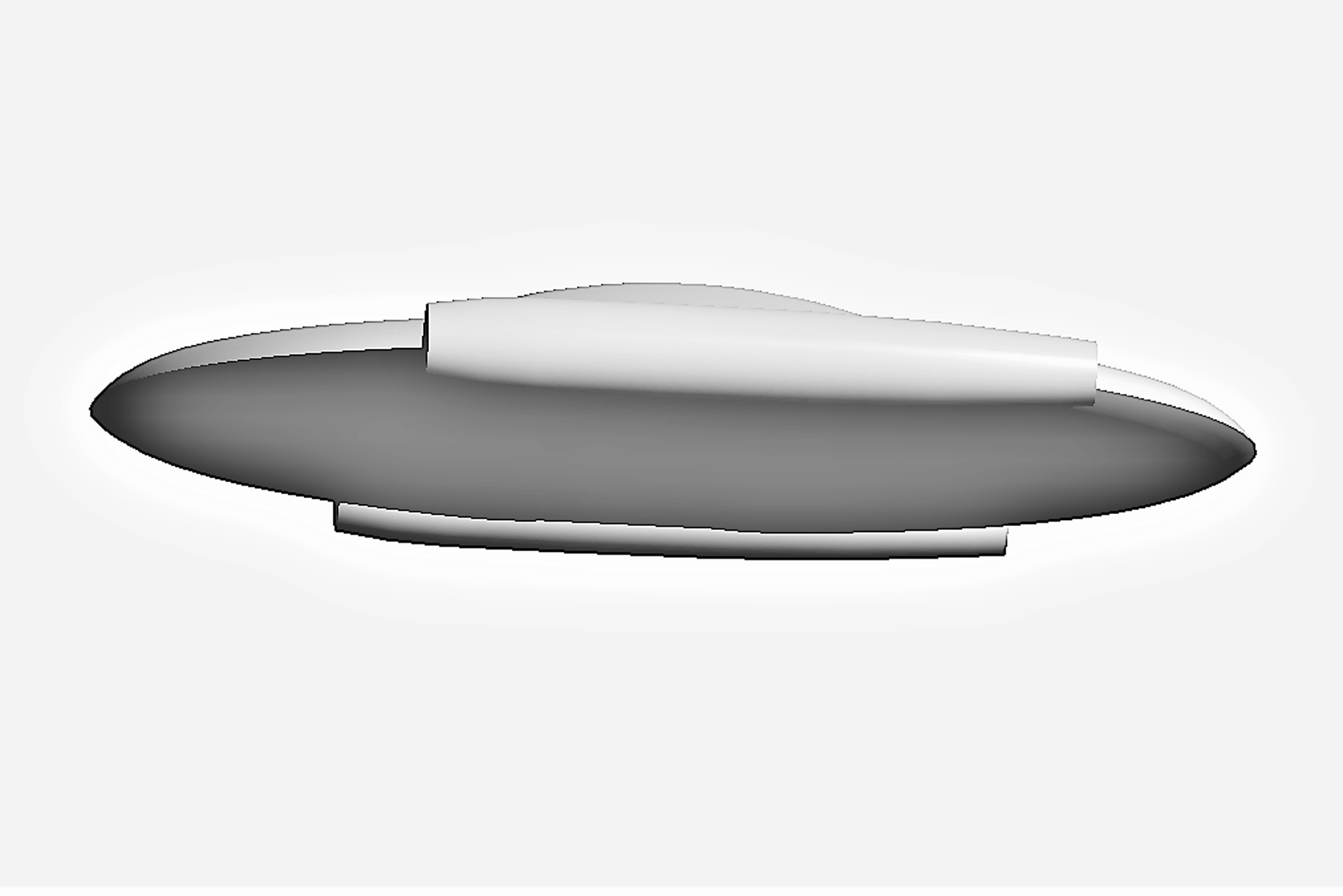
Lateral bottom view with the annular duct closed off by shutter or louvers

After the aircraft reaches the speed of aerodynamic flight, the annular duct is closed off by shutters mounted at the top and bottom of the duct to form a smooth disc wing. The lift fans stop working and are enclosed in the annular duct during cruise flight. The traditional ailerons and elevators located at the rear edge of the outer wing are needed for roll and pitch control, but the rudder probably is not necessary.

According to the CFD simulations, turbofans with a thrust-to-weight ratio of 0.3 can enable a top forward speed of Mach 0.62 (759 km/h) based on aerodynamic drag predictions, much faster than helicopters and tiltrotors.

== Dead weight ==
Because the lift fan system does not work in cruise, it is dead weight in flight. However, this problem can be greatly mitigated by very thin annular fan blades with a thickness of only 1% chord length. The very thin blades are used because they are optimal for hovering efficiency. For a thin 32-blade fan, the strength of carbon fiber composite material is strong enough, with a weight of only 1.05% of the total aircraft weight. The total weight of the lift fan system including the bearings, gears, and rings can be hopefully controlled to less than 5% of the aircraft weight.
