= Bamboo-copter =

Toy helicopter rotor-like top

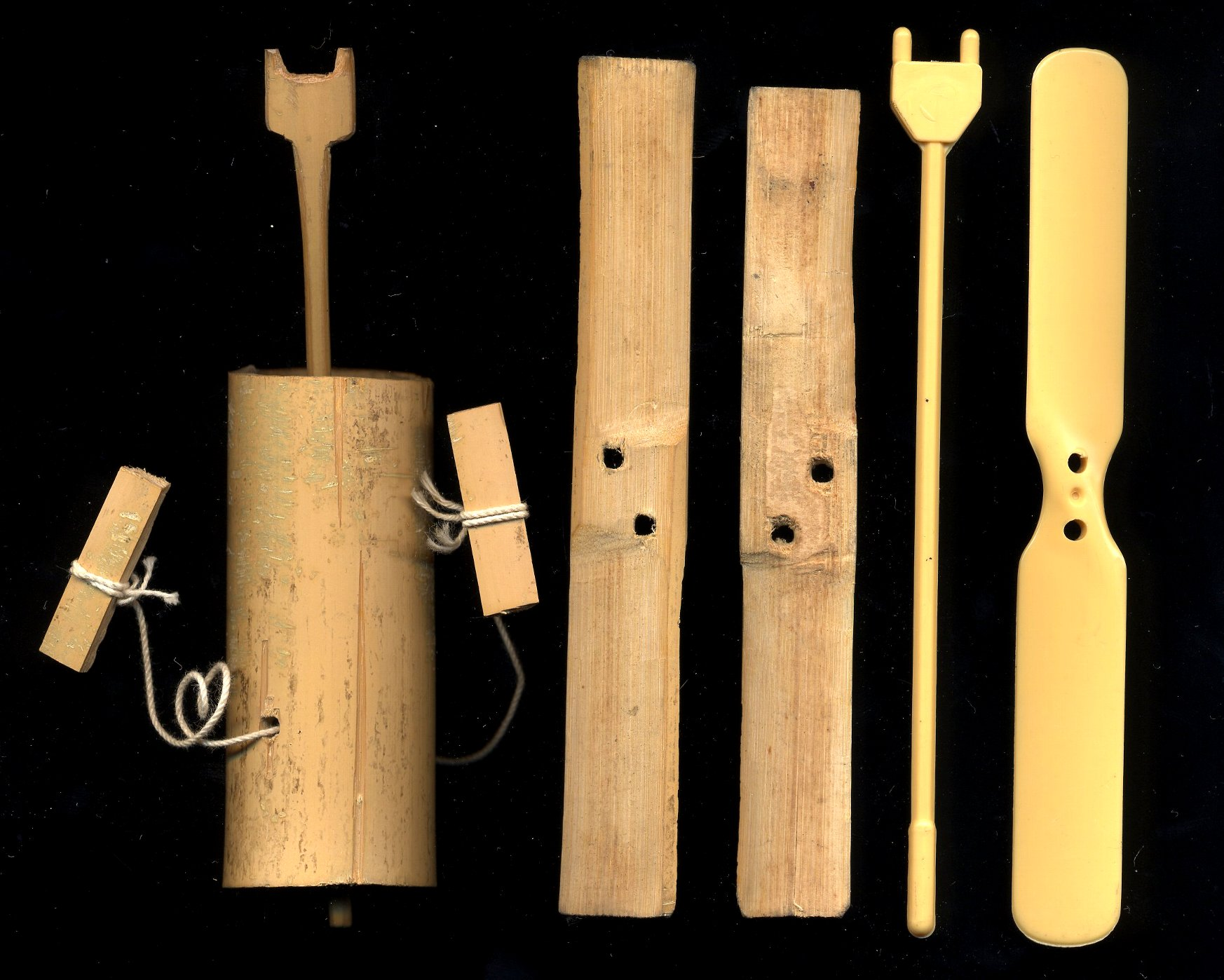
Modern Japanese taketombo bamboo-copters; wooden type with winding thread (left); plastic type (right)

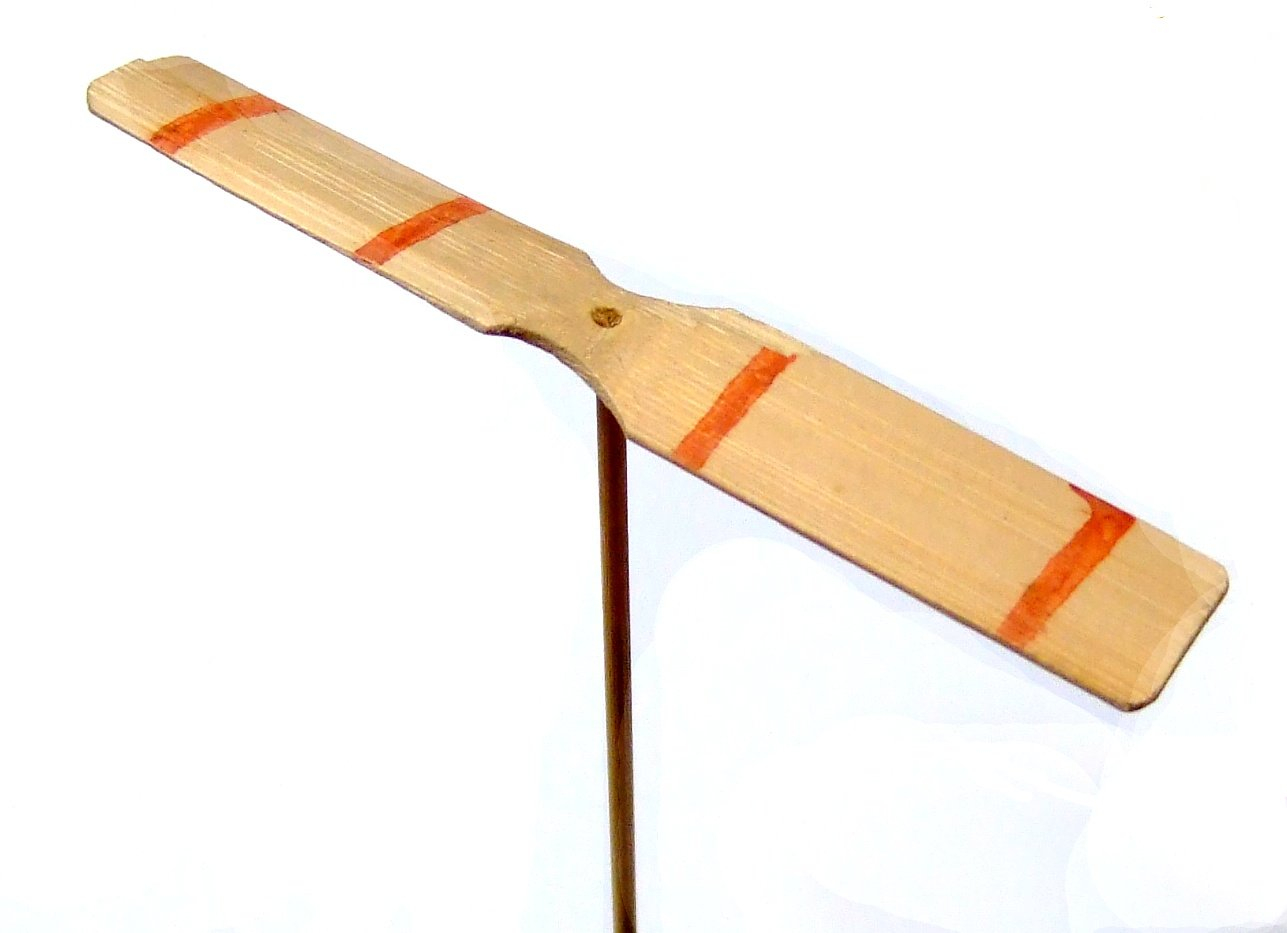
A decorated Japanese taketombo propeller

The bamboo-copter, also known as the bamboo dragonfly or Chinese top (Chinese: zhuqingting (竹蜻蜓), Japanese: taketonbo 竹蜻蛉), is a toy helicopter rotor that flies upward when its shaft is rapidly spun. This helicopter-like top originated in Jin dynasty China around 320 AD, and was the object of early experiments by English engineer George Cayley, the inventor of modern aeronautics.

== History ==
In China, the earliest known flying toys consisted of feathers at the end of a stick, which was rapidly spun between the hands and released into flight. "While the Chinese top was no more than a toy, it is perhaps the first tangible device of what we may understand as a helicopter."

The Jin dynasty Daoist philosopher Ge Hong's (c. 317) book Baopuzi (抱樸子 "Master Who Embraces Simplicity") mentioned a flying vehicle in what Joseph Needham calls "truly an astonishing passage":

Some have made flying cars [feiche 飛車] with wood from the inner part of the jujube tree, using ox-leather (straps) fastened to returning blades so as to set the machine in motion [huan jian yi yin chiji 環劍以引其機]. Others have had the idea of making five snakes, six dragons and three oxen, to meet the "hard wind" [gangfeng 罡風] and ride on it, not stopping until they have risen to a height of forty li. That region is called [Taiqing 太清] (the purest of empty space). There the [qi] is extremely hard, so much so that it can overcome (the strength of) human beings. As the Teacher says: "The kite (bird) flies higher and higher spirally, and then only needs to stretch its two wings, beating the air no more, in order to go forward by itself. This is because it starts gliding (lit. riding) on the 'hard wind' [gangqi 罡炁]. Take dragons, for example; when they first rise they go up using the clouds as steps, and after they have attained a height of forty li then they rush forward effortlessly (lit. automatically) (gliding)." This account comes from the adepts [xianren 仙人], and is handed down to ordinary people, but they are not likely to understand it.

Needham concludes that Ge Hong was describing helicopter tops because "'returning (or revolving) blades' can hardly mean anything else, especially in close association with a belt or strap"; and suggests that "snakes", "dragons", and "oxen" refer to shapes of man-lifting kites. Other scholars interpret this Baopuzi passage mythologically instead of literally, based on its context's mentioning fantastic flights through chengqiao (乘蹻 "riding on tiptoe/stilts") and xian (仙 "immortal; adept") techniques. For instance, "If you can ride the arches of your feet, you will be able to wander anywhere in the world without hindrance from mountains or rivers … Whoever takes the correct amulet and gives serious thought to the process may travel a thousand miles by concentrating his thoughts for one double hour." Compare this translation.

Some build a flying vehicle from the pith of the jujube tree and have it drawn by a sword with a thong of buffalo hide at the end of its grip. Others let their thoughts dwell on the preparation of a joint rectangle from five serpents, six dragons, and three buffaloes, and mount in this for forty miles to the region known as Paradise.

This Chinese helicopter toy was introduced into Europe and "made its earliest appearances in Renaissance European paintings and in the drawings of Leonardo da Vinci." The toy helicopter appears in a c. 1460 French picture of the Madonna and Child at the Musée du Palais de Tesse’ in Mans depicting the Child holding a toy copter sitting in Mary's lap next to St Benôit (unknown artist), and in a 16th-century stained glass panel at the Victoria and Albert Museum in London. A picture from c. 1560 by Pieter Breughel the Elder at the Kunsthistorisches Museum in Vienna, Children's Games, depicts a helicopter top with three airscrews.

"The helicopter top in China led to nothing but amusement and pleasure, but fourteen hundred years later it was to be one of the key elements in the birth of modern aeronautics in the West." Early Western scientists developed flying machines based upon the original Chinese model. The Russian polymath Mikhail Lomonosov developed a spring-driven coaxial rotor in 1743, and the French naturalist Christian de Launoy created a bow drill device with contra-rotating feather propellers.

In 1792, George Cayley began experimenting with helicopter tops, which he later called "rotary wafts" or "elevating fliers". His landmark (1809) article "On Aerial Navigation" pictured and described a flying model with two propellers (constructed from corks and feathers) powered by a whalebone bow drill. "In 1835 Cayley remarked that while the original toy would rise no more than about 20 or 25 feet (6 or 7.5 metres), his improved models would 'mount upward of 90 ft (27 metres) into the air'. This then was the direct ancestor of the helicopter rotor and the aircraft propeller."

Discussing the history of Chinese inventiveness, the British scientist, sinologist, and historian Joseph Needham wrote, "Some inventions seem to have arisen merely from a whimsical curiosity, such as the 'hot air balloons' made from eggshells which did not lead to any aeronautical use or aerodynamic discoveries, or the zoetrope which did not lead onto the kinematograph, or the helicopter top which did not lead to the helicopter."

== In popular culture ==
In the Japanese anime and manga Doraemon, one of Doraemon’s gadgets, the Takecopter (夕ケコプター, Takekoputā), is based on and resembles the taketonbo. It makes the user fly when it is worn on the head.
