= Advance ratio =

Ratio of freestream speed to tip speed

Diameter of the propeller.

The propeller advance ratio or coefficient is a dimensionless number used in aeronautics and marine hydrodynamics to describe the relationship between the speed at which a vehicle (like an airplane or a boat) is moving forward and the speed at which its propeller is turning. It helps in understanding the efficiency of the propeller at different speeds and is particularly useful in the design and analysis of propeller-driven vehicles.It is the ratio of the freestream fluid speed to the propeller, rotor, or cyclorotor tip speed. When a propeller-driven vehicle is moving at high speed relative to the fluid, or the propeller is rotating slowly, the advance ratio of its propeller(s) is a high number. When the vehicle is moving at low speed or the propeller is rotating at high speed, the advance ratio is a low number. The advance ratio is a useful non-dimensional quantity in helicopter and propeller theory, since propellers and rotors will experience the same angle of attack on every blade airfoil section at the same advance ratio regardless of actual forward speed. It is the inverse of the tip speed ratio used for wind turbines.

== Mathematical definition ==
=== Propellers ===
The advance ratio J is a non-dimensional term given by:

$$J = \frac{V_a}{nD},$$

where

V_{a}	is the freestream fluid velocity in m/s, typically the true airspeed of the aircraft or the water speed of the vessel
n	is the rotational speed of the propeller in revolutions per second
D	is the propeller's diameter in m

=== Helicopter rotors and cyclorotors ===
The advance ratio μ is defined as:

$$\mu = \frac{V_{\infty}}{\Omega r},$$

where

V_{∞}	is the free-stream fluid velocity in m/s, typically the true airspeed of the helicopter
Ω	is the rotor rotational speed in $\frac{rad}{s}$
r	is the rotor radius in m

== Significance ==
=== Propellers ===
Low Advance Ratio (J < 1): When the advance ratio is low, the vehicle is moving forward slowly relative to the propeller speed. This usually happens at low speeds or when the propeller is turning very fast.

High Advance Ratio (J > 1): When the advance ratio is high, the vehicle is moving forward quickly compared to the propeller's rotational speed. This typically occurs at higher speeds or when the propeller is turning more slowly.

The advance ratio is critical for determining the efficiency of a propeller. At different advance ratios, the propeller may produce more or less thrust. Engineers use this ratio to optimize the design of the propeller and the engine, ensuring that the vehicle operates efficiently at its intended cruising speed, see propeller theory.

For instance, an airplane's propeller needs to be efficient both during takeoff (where the advance ratio is low) and at cruising altitude (where the advance ratio is higher). Similarly, a boat's propeller design will vary depending on whether it's designed for slow-speed maneuvering or high-speed travel.

=== Helicopters ===
Single rotor helicopters are limited in forward speed by a combination of sonic tip speed and retreating blade stall. As the advance ratio increases, the relative velocity experienced by the retreating blade decreases so that the tip of the blade experiences zero velocity at an advance ratio of one. Helicopter rotors pitch the retreating blade to a higher angle of attack to maintain lift as the relative velocity decreases. At a sufficiently high advance ratio, the blade will reach the stalling angle of attack and experience retreating blade stall. Specially designed airfoils can increase the operating advance ratio by utilizing high lift coefficient airfoils. Currently, single rotor helicopters are practically limited to advance ratios less than 0.7.

== Relation to tip speed ratio ==
The advance ratio is the inverse of the tip speed ratio, $\lambda$, used in wind turbine aerodynamics:

$$\mu = \lambda^{-1}$$.

In operation, propellers and rotors are generally spinning, but could be immersed in a stationary fluid. Thus the tip speed is placed in the denominator so the advance ratio increases from zero to a positive non-infinite value as the velocity increases. Wind turbines use the reciprocal to prevent infinite values since they start stationary in a moving fluid.

== See also ==
- Axial fan design
- Retreating blade stall
- Helicopter rotor
- Slowed rotor
- Aircraft propeller
- Propeller Theory
