= Variable-pitch propeller =

Variable-pitch propeller can refer to:

- Variable-pitch propeller (marine)
- Variable-pitch propeller (aeronautics)
