= Kiteboating =

Water sport

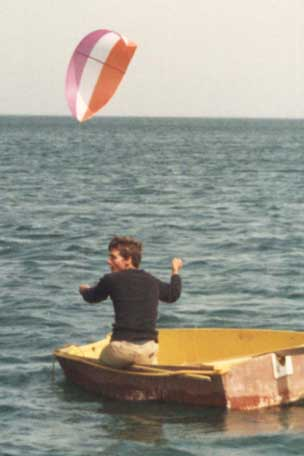
An early (1984) experimental kite rig being used to pull a boat.

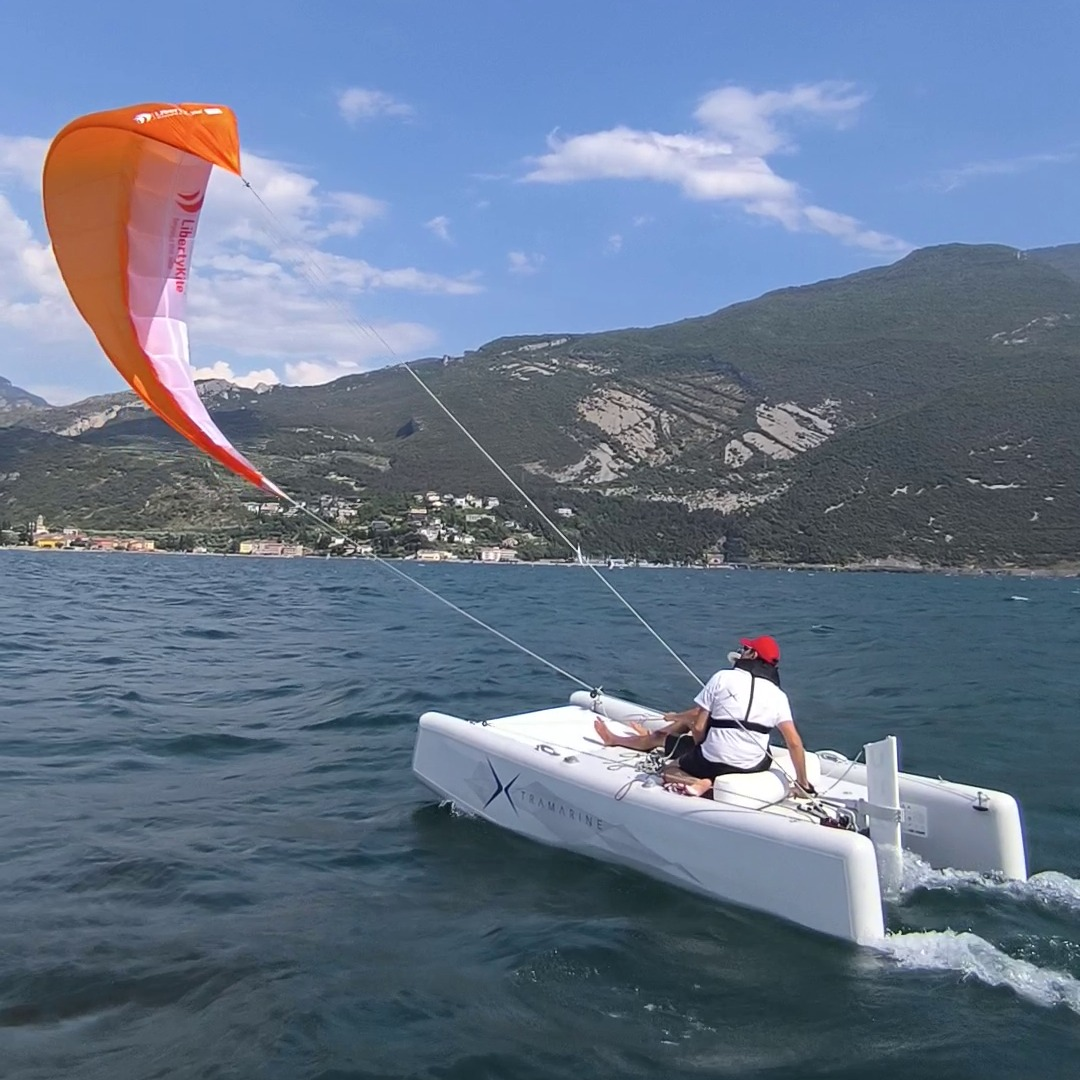
XTRAMARINE X-FUN electric inflatable catamaran configured as kiteboat

Kiteboating, kite boating, or kitesailing, is the act of using a kite rig as a power source to propel a boat. Kiteboating is a type of surface water sport, but it also has transportation uses

== Equipment ==
Kiteboating uses different types of gear from kitesurfing. Kites attached to boats can be larger than kites attached to a surfer. For long voyages, the kite rig must be more autonomously controlled. Due to the lifting power of kites, they are often used with hydrofoils.

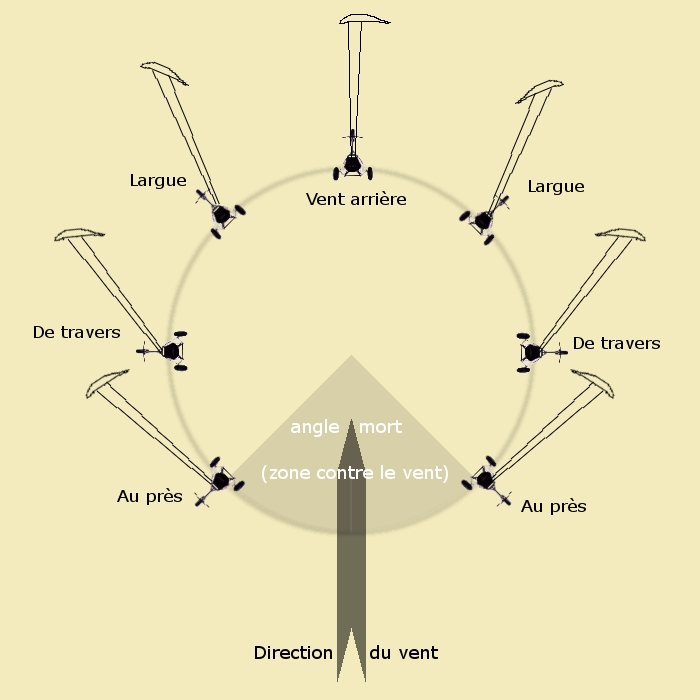
Points of sail (with a kite buggy)

Current kite rigs can be sailed within 50 degrees of the wind. Placing turbines in the boat's hull can let the kite power generate electricity on board.

== History ==
Going back to 1800s, George Pocock used the kites in order to increase the size of propel carts that are found in land and boats. Sébastien Cattelan is the French kitesurfer was the first sailor who was able to break 50 knots, achieving 50.26 knots on 3 October 2008 at the Lüderitz Speed Challenge in Namibia. Next, on 14 November 2009, Alex Caizergues achieved a speed of 50.98 knots in Namibia.

== Patents ==
- US Patent 6003457 Boat powered by means of a kite via a hinged arm by Pierre Chatelain. Filed:1 April 1998.

== See also ==
- Kite rig
- Kite types
- Kitesurfing
- SkySails
- Power kite
