= Parasailing =

Aerial manned-kite sport

Parasailing with a yacht

Parasailing, also known as parascending, is a water sport that involves a parafoil or modified parachute being towed behind a moving vehicle (usually a powerboat), so that the angle of attack at which the apparent wind flowing against the canopy will generate lift and carry passengers into the air. Commercial parasailing enterprises operate worldwide, and include customized powerboats that can seat numerous observers and up to three airborne parasailors at a time, wearing body harnasses and/or seated in a Customized Gondola.

Parasailing is primarily practiced as a recreational activity, and is distinct from similar sports such as paragliding, paraskiing, or parakiting, which typically operated in different environments like open fields and mountain ranges.

In Europe, land-based parasailing is a competitive sport. In these competitions, the parasail is towed to a specific height behind an automobile, and the driver and/or the parasailor releases the tow line to land in a specific target area. The first international competitions for land-based parasailing were held in the mid-1980s and have continued annually since then. These competitions have grown in both size and scope over the years, attracting more participants and spectators alike.

== Terminology ==
=== Spinnaker ===
Spinnaker is a recreational activity commonly mistaken as parasailing. Both allow people to ascend on the ocean by using wind force against a specially designed canopy. Parasailing includes ascending, while spinnaker allows a person to swing at the front of the tow vehicle (i.e. a boat).

=== Parachute ===
Both parachutes and parasails can ascend and glide. The primary difference between them is that parasails are more stable and efficient during ascent mode when being towed aloft with minimum or zero steering control by the parasailor. The parachute is not efficient when towed and is primarily used for skydiving where the parachutist can fully control the direction. In descent mode, both are designed to slow the fall of a person at any given altitude.

== History ==
=== Early years of Parakiting ===
There is at least one somewhat credible early-19c indication of a person being towed through the air on a kite; the instance is mentioned in passing as having been witnessed by an old sailor telling of it on the 1839-1841 cruise of the USS Constitution.

=== Early years of Parasailing ===
The first ascending-gliding parachute was developed by Pierre-Marcel Lemoigne in 1962. The same year, Lemoigne established an Aeronautical Training Center to introduce his new ascending-gliding parachute as a training tool for parachutists. The technique allows parachutists to train more efficiently by towing the parachutist to a suitable altitude, then releasing them to practice landings. This training method proved cheaper than—and just as effective as—an airplane. In 1963, Jacques-André Istel from Pioneer Parachute Company bought a license from Lemoigne to manufacture and sell the 24-gore ascending-gliding parachute which was trade-named "parasail."

=== Commercial Parasailing Equipment Inventions ===
In 1974, Mark McCulloh invented the first self-contained parasail launch and recovery vessel that incorporated a hydraulic winch and canopy assist mast that collectively launched and retrieved the parasail canopy and parasailors to and from the vessel flight deck. McCulloh's invention was patented in 1976 and later referred to as a "WINCHBOAT" which set the first parasail equipment industry standard that is utilized by all commercial parasail operations around the world.

In 1976, Brian Gaskin designed, created, and tested the first 16-gore canopy design which he named "Waterbird". The Waterbird was revolutionary in its canopy design, its unique tow yoke harness arrangement, its construction, and the use of zero porosity fabrics which allowed it to be used over water safely. The majority of commercial parasail operators then moved to the 16-gore canopy arrangement.

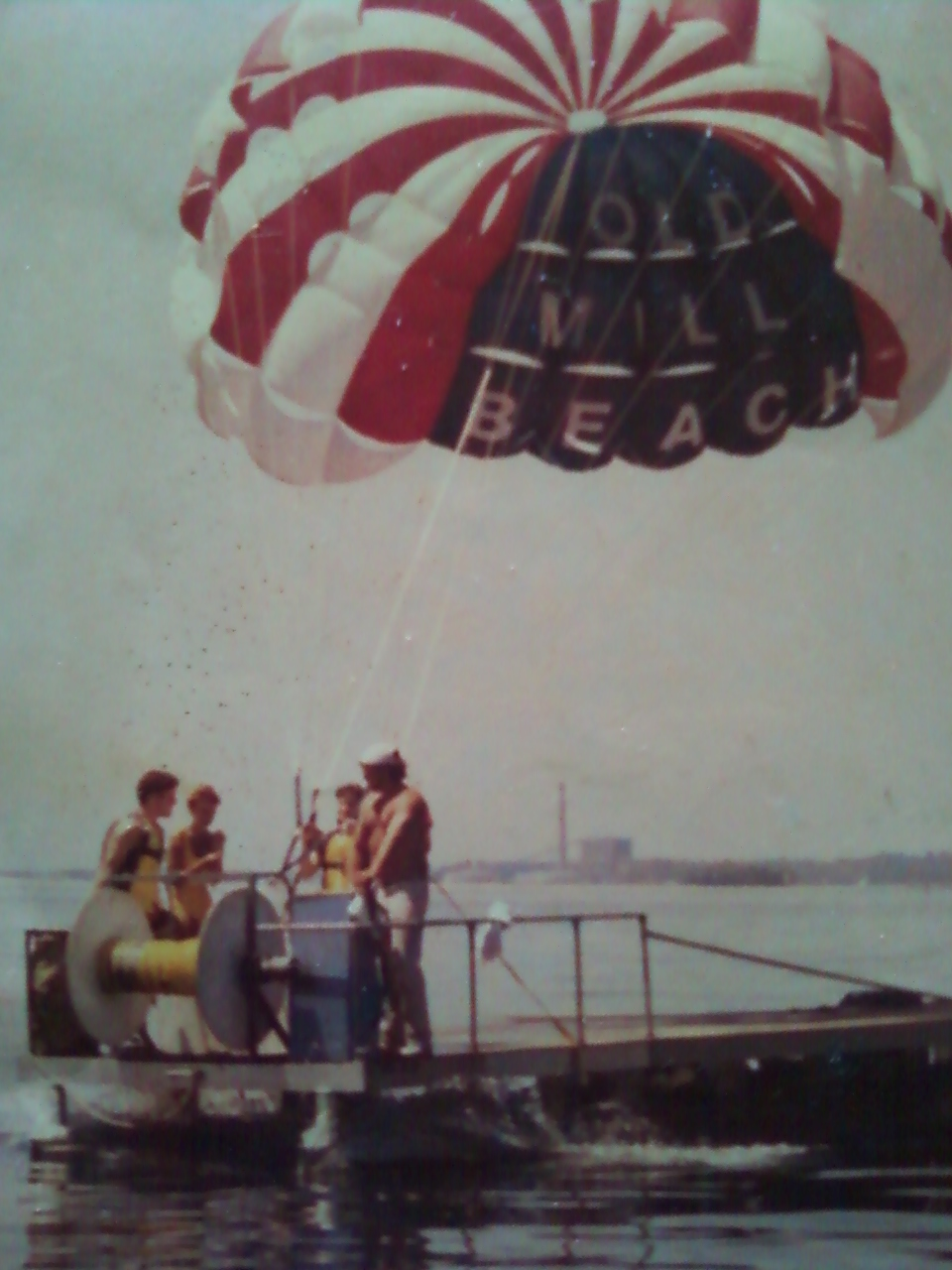
Chouteau's Old Mill Airlines, Westport, CT, 1981

In 1981 Marcel and Azby Chouteau of Westport, Connecticut, designed and built a pontoon-based craft with a fan-shaped back deck and a winch in the front and ran a commercial parasailing operation using their original technology. The company, Old Mill Airlines, offered flights on Long Island Sound during the summer of 1981.

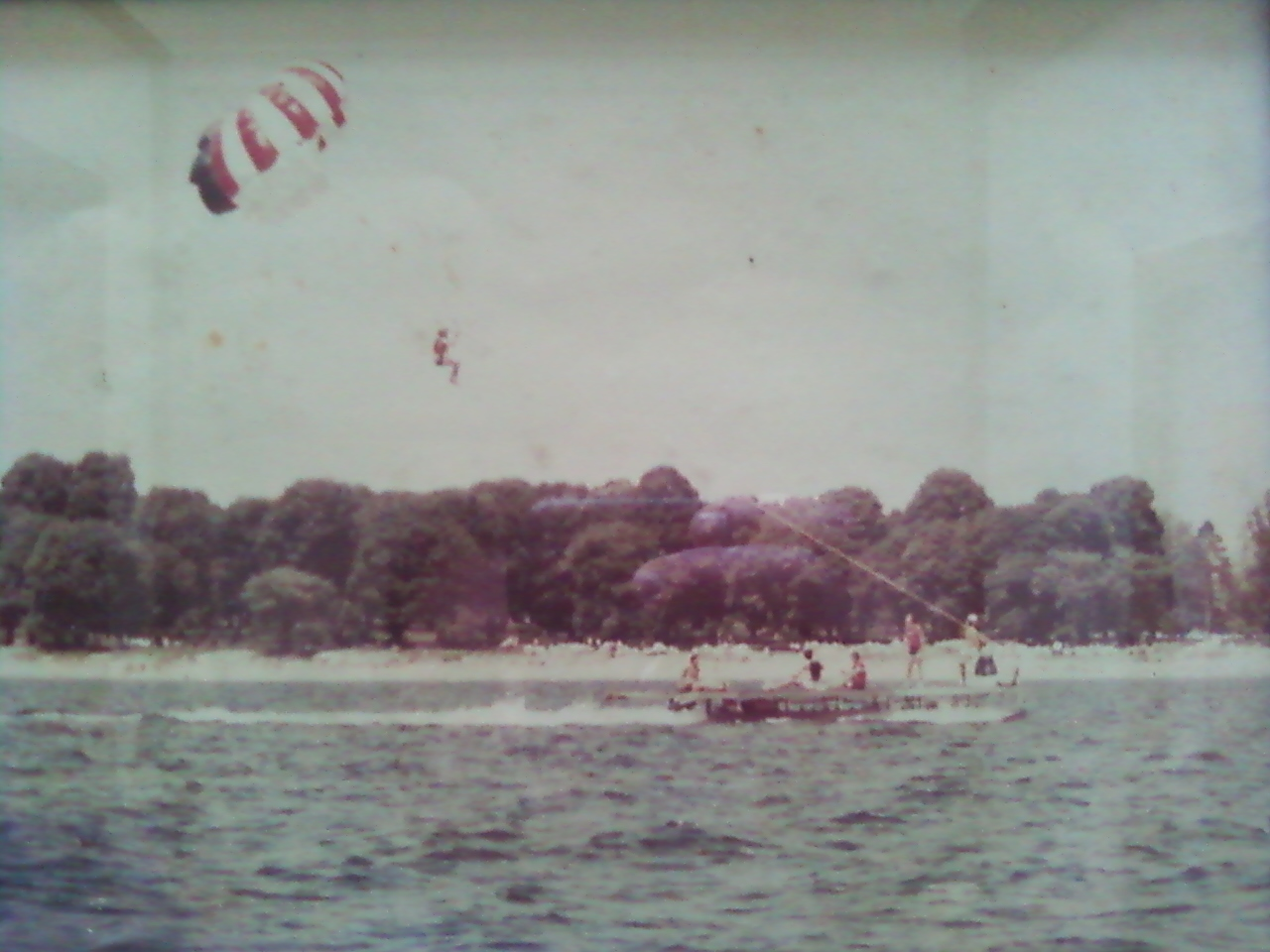
Chouteau's Old Mill Airlines, Westport, CT, 1981

=== Commercial Parasailing Weather Standards ===
In April 2013, the ASTM established the first parasail weather standards for commercial parasailing operations.

=== Improved Parasail Canopy Designs ===
In recent years, operators have moved from small (20-foot range) parachutes to large (30–40 feet) parachutes with high-lift, low-drag designs, enabling operators to fly heavier payloads in lower (typically safer) winds. Most operators now offer double and triple flights using an adjustable side-by-side bar arrangement. The side-by-side aluminum bar is attached to the yoke of the chute, allowing two or three passenger harnesses to be attached side by side.

=== Regulations ===
In 2014, the National Transportation Safety Board issued a press release in which it found the parasailing industry to be largely unregulated. The report identified a number of safety concerns which included vessel operators who continued to operate despite hazardous wind conditions, use of inadequate equipment and unserviceable gear, and compromised strength of rope tied to the parasail. In a period from 1998 to the third of July 2013, there were six parasailing fatalities in the Florida area. The great majority of deaths in parasail incidents have occurred when riders were unable to get out of their harness support system after an unplanned landing in water during high winds.

Prior to the release of the NTSB report, Florida passed the White-Miskell Act which added strict regulations parasailing companies must follow including obtaining an insurance policy, and restrictions on parasailing in inclement weather.

== Parasailing associations ==
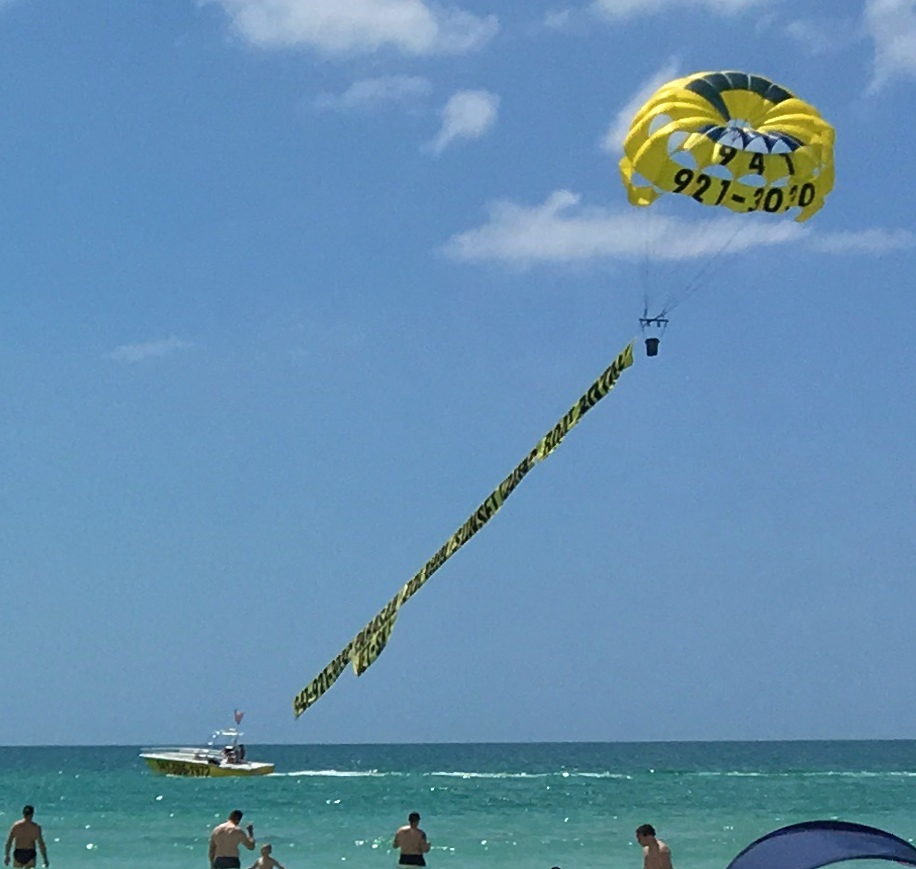
Banner towing by parasailing at Crescent Beach on Siesta Key

The leading trade associations for parasailing are:

- Commercial Winchboat Operators Association (CWOA)
- Parasail Safety Council
- PAPO (Professional Association of Parasail Operators)
- Water Sports Industry Association
- EPPA (European Professional Parasailing Association)?

== See also ==
- Kite line
- Kite mooring
- Kite types
- Kitesurfing
- Paragliding
