= White-Miskell Act =

The White-Miskill Act for Parasailing. is a law enacted by the legislature of the State of Florida in 2014 for the control of the sport of parasailing. It relates to commercial and recreational water activities prohibiting certain water activities within some areas and specifies the requirements for the operator of a vessel engaged in commercial parasailing.

The Act

1. Requires that the owner of a vessel engaged in commercial parasailing obtains and maintains an insurance policy.
2. Requires that the operator has a current and valid license issued by the United States Coast Guard.
3. Prohibits commercial parasailing unless certain equipment is present on the vessel and certain weather conditions are met; requiring that a weather log be maintained and made available for inspection.

== Definitions ==
"Commercial parasailing" means providing or offering to provide for payment any activity involving the towing of a person by a motorboat if:
(a) One or more persons are tethered to the towing vessel;
(b) The person or persons ascend above the water; and
(c) The person or persons remain suspended under a canopy, chute, or parasail above the water while the vessel is underway.
The term does not include ultralight glider towing conducted under rules of the Federal Aviation Administration governing ultralight vehicles as defined in 14 C.F.R. part 103

== Area limits ==
A person may not operate any vessel towing a parasail or engage in parasailing or operate a moored balloon within 100 feet of the marked channel of the Florida Intracoastal Waterway or within 2 miles of the boundary of any airport unless otherwise permitted under federal law.

A person may not engage in kite boarding or kite surfing within an area that extends 1 mile in a direct line along the centerline of an airport runway and that has a width measuring one-half mile unless otherwise permitted under federal law.

== Insurance ==
The owner or operator of a vessel engaged in commercial parasailing may not offer or provide for payment any parasailing activity unless the owner or operator first obtains and maintains an insurance policy from an insurance carrier licensed in Florida or approved by the Office of Insurance Regulation or an eligible surplus lines insurer. This policy must provide bodily injury liability coverage in the amounts of at least $1 million per occurrence and $2 million annual aggregate. Proof of insurance must be available for inspection at the location where commercial parasailing is offered or provided for consideration, and each customer who requests such proof shall be provided with the insurance carrier's name and address and the insurance policy number.

== Operator license ==
The operator of a vessel engaged in commercial parasailing must have a current and valid license issued by the United States Coast Guard authorizing the operator to carry passengers for hire. The license must be appropriate for the number of passengers carried and the displacement of the vessel. The license must be carried on the vessel and be available for inspection while engaging in commercial parasailing activities.

== Marine radio and weather ==
A vessel engaged in commercial parasailing must be equipped with a functional marine VHF radio and a separate electronic device capable of providing access to National Weather Service forecasts and current weather conditions. Commercial parasailing is prohibited if the current observed wind conditions in the area of operation include a sustained wind speed of more than 20 miles per hour; if wind gusts are 15 miles per hour higher than the sustained wind speed; if the wind speed during gusts exceeds 25 miles per hour; if rain or heavy fog results in reduced visibility of less than 0.5 mile; or if a known lightning storm comes within 7 miles of the parasailing area.

The operator of the vessel engaged in commercial parasailing shall use all available means to determine prevailing and forecasted weather conditions and record this information in a weather logbook each time passengers are to be taken out on the water. The weather log must be available for inspection at all times at the operator's place of business.

== Violation ==
A commercial operator or person who violates this Act commits a misdemeanor of the Second Degree punishable as provided in Florida Statutes s. 775.082 or s. 775.083.

== Criticisms ==
The delay in enacting legislation for the control of paragliding was a major area of criticism prior to introduction of the Bill.
