= Kite applications =

Uses of flying kites

Different types of flying kites (such as water kites, bi-media kites, fluid kites, gas kites, kytoons, paravanes, soil kites, solid kites, and plasma kites) have niche applications. In nature, some animals, such as spiders, also make use of kiting.

== Aerial photography ==
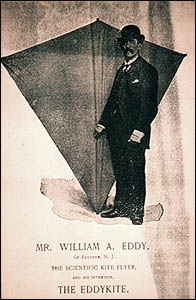
William Abner Eddy patented a kite. He used kites for aerial photography (KAP).

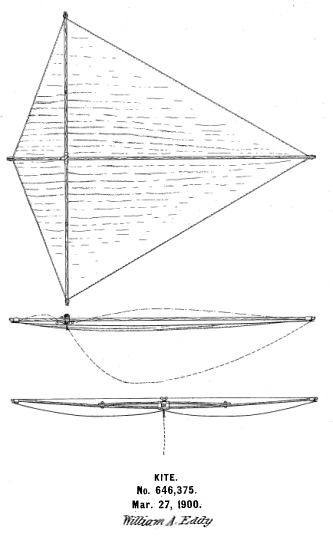
US646375 Willian A. Eddy kite patent image.

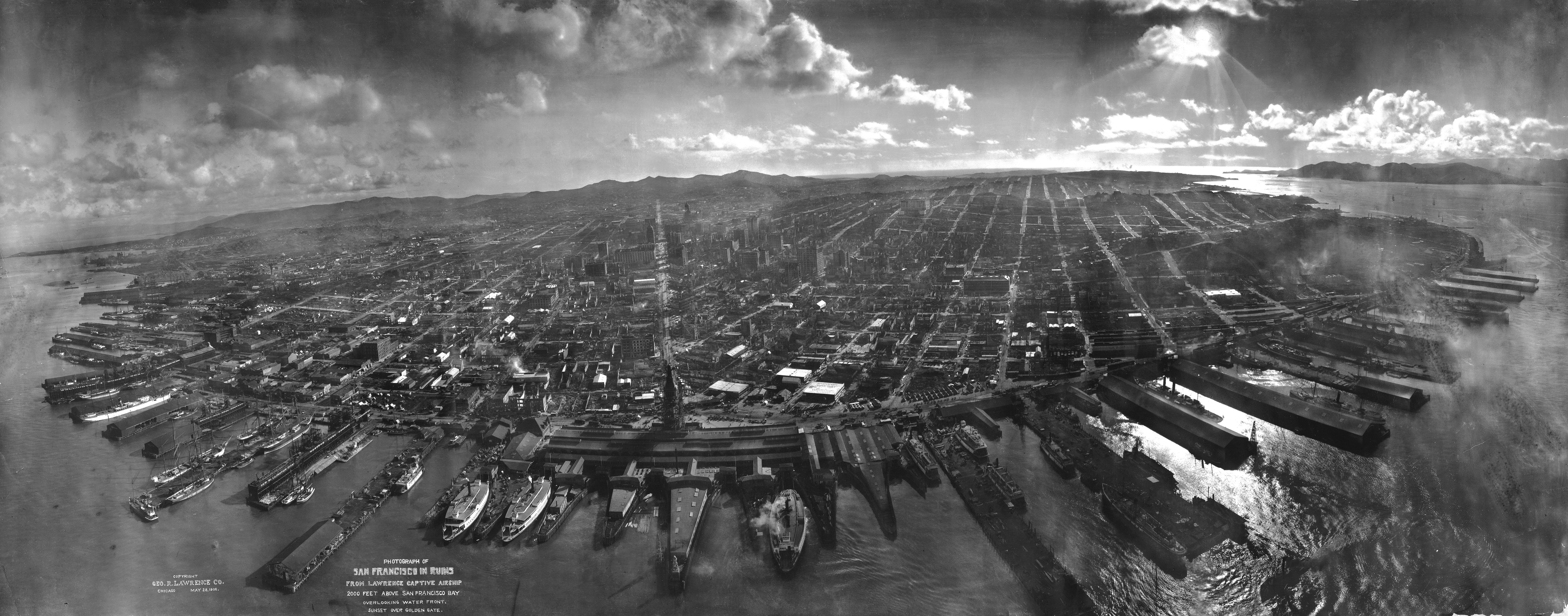
Photo of the ruins of the 1906 San Francisco earthquake by George Lawrence of Chicago. Photographed using a kite system to loft a panoramic camera.

William A. Eddy, the maker of Eddy-kite fame, lifted cameras to take photographs of cities and landscapes. Today kite aerial photography (KAP) is the hobby of many enthusiasts, is a tool for surveying land and animals, and a mode for artistic expression. Professor Charles Benton illustrates how KAP can grow in one's life. Scott Haefner has one of the most extensive collections of KAP photographs; he shares his technology. San Francisco. Those who do KAP are called Kapers KAP.

== Teaching ==
The kite is frequently used along with a vehicle for teaching aerodynamics, mathematics, physical education, and problem-solving.

== Transport ==
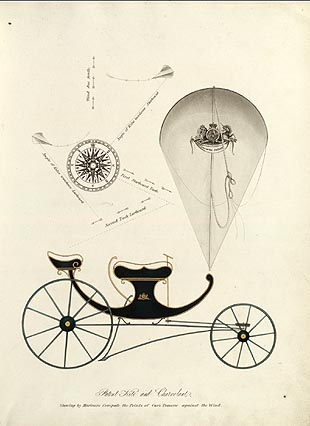
George Pocock's contribution being illustrated.

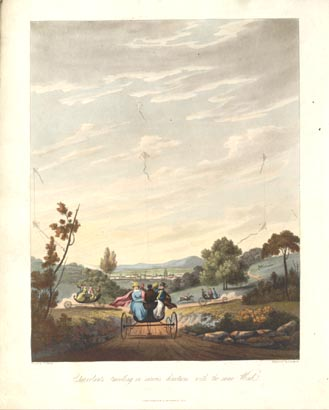
Painting of kite tugging wheeled vehicle.

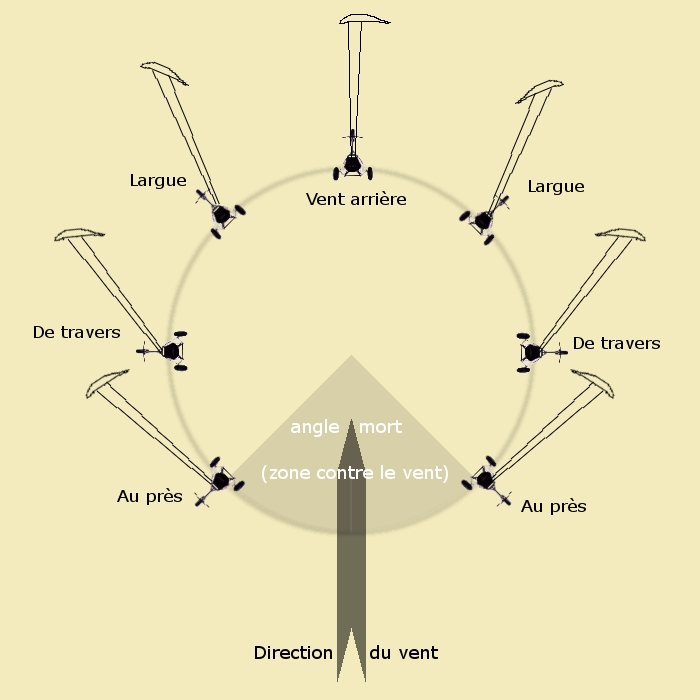
Getting around in a kite buggy.

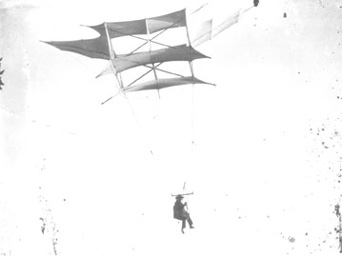
Transport people up into the sky with man-lifting kites for observation, entertainment, photography, and recreation.

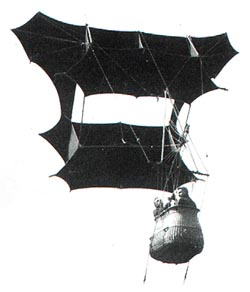
Man-lifter kite designed by Samuel Franklin Cody (1867–1913). As the kite observes its enemy it raises its antenna.

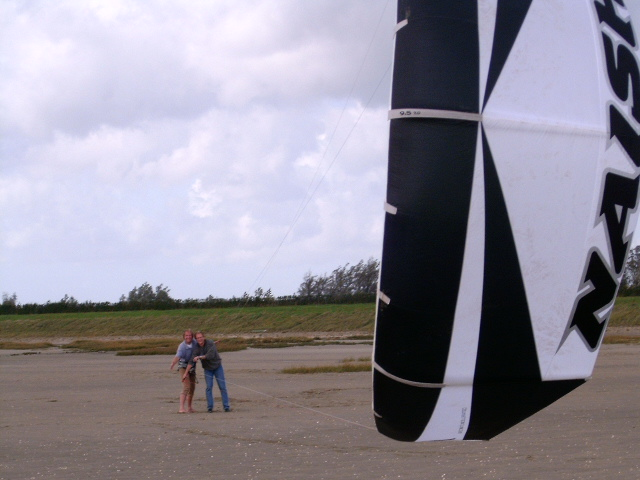
A quad-line traction kite, commonly used as a power source for kite surfing. Application: sport, recreation, exercise, rest, product demonstration.

Long-distance travel across the land, ice, and sea started centuries ago, but today significant tasks of moving people and goods from point A to point B are occurring; this is so in part from the advances in kites and kite systems designs and technology, a better understanding of winds, and use of computers and GPS. In 1889 kite sailing was carefully instructed via controlling large kite systems towing boats.

Using kites to reduce the work done by an engine in propelling a cargo ship is an idea that is gaining traction as a result of increasing fuel prices and environmental concerns. For example, SkySails GmbH have developed technology that they estimate can reduce fuel usage by 10–35% per day on average. A trial on board the MS Beluga resulted in fuel savings estimated to be worth £800 per day.

Free-flight cross-country hang gliding kites both in the hang glider style and the paraglider style are permitting trips of hundreds of miles; records are recorded by the FAI. George Pocock (inventor) was an early pioneer in kites for transportation. NASA continues to explore free-flying kites for delivering goods to the earth surface and non-earth planet surfaces, including Mars. There are several projects for using very large kites to sail cargo ships currently underway: KiteSail and KiteShip along with a series of patents and improvements in control of large ship-carried kite systems aim to save significant amounts of fuel. Kiting one's kayak is getting a significant following A. Kinsman – kite kayaking tutorial..

Kite yachting may have started with Benjamin Franklin's pond pull. English Channel crossing.

Anne Quemere has crossed the Atlantic Ocean solo using power kites. And on 4 November 2008, she started her bid to cross the Pacific Ocean under power kites as sailing power to pull her in her small boat called Oceankite.

=== Cargo ===
SkySails has developed ship-pulling kites as a supplemental power source for cargo ships, which was first tested in January 2008 on the MS Beluga Skysails. Trials on the 55-metre (180 ft) ship indicated that, in favorable winds, the kite increases fuel efficiency by up to 30 percent. This system was planned to be in commercial production in late 2008.

MS Beluga Skysails is the world's first commercial container cargo ship which is partially powered by a 160-square-metre (1,700 sq ft), computer-controlled kite which can reduce fuel consumption by 20 percent. Launched 17 December 2007, it was scheduled to leave the north German port of Bremerhaven for Guanta, Venezuela at 1700 local time (1600 GMT) on 22 January 2008. SkySails managing director Stephan Wrage said, "During the next few months we will finally be able to prove that our technology works in practice and significantly reduces fuel consumption and emissions." Verena Frank, project manager at Beluga Shipping (SkySails' partner), said: "The project's core concept was using wind energy as auxiliary propulsion power and using wind as a free of charge energy".

The idea of using wind to power sailing ships is an old one. Large kites have advantages over traditional sails. A well-designed kite can generate up to 25 times more power per unit area than a sail. Kites can be flown high above the ship, taking advantage of stronger, steadier winds. A kite flying on a 200-metre (220 yd) line will have twice as much available wind energy as a kite on a 10-metre (33 ft) line. A kite's shape blocks air like a traditional sail and acts as an aerofoil, with the combined forces of lift and drag pulling the boat through the water. All that is needed to operate the kite is a winch and a storage area near the front of the ship, which can be fitted with little modification at low cost. A sail requires a mast, which is much more expensive and reduces the cargo area on the ship's deck. Kites have also been proposed for logging, to lift logs out of areas without roads.

== Advertising / promotional ==
Kites can also be used as light-effect carrier, e.g., by carrying glow sticks or battery-powered light effects. Companies may buy large quantities of kites that feature their advertisement. Messages are sometimes displayed by lighting systems that are built into the kite system.

Many kite stores fly kites regularly so that people will see the kites; one of the final purposes is for the store to profit from the flying of the kites. Kites are necessary to increase sales of kites.

== Entertainment and recreation ==
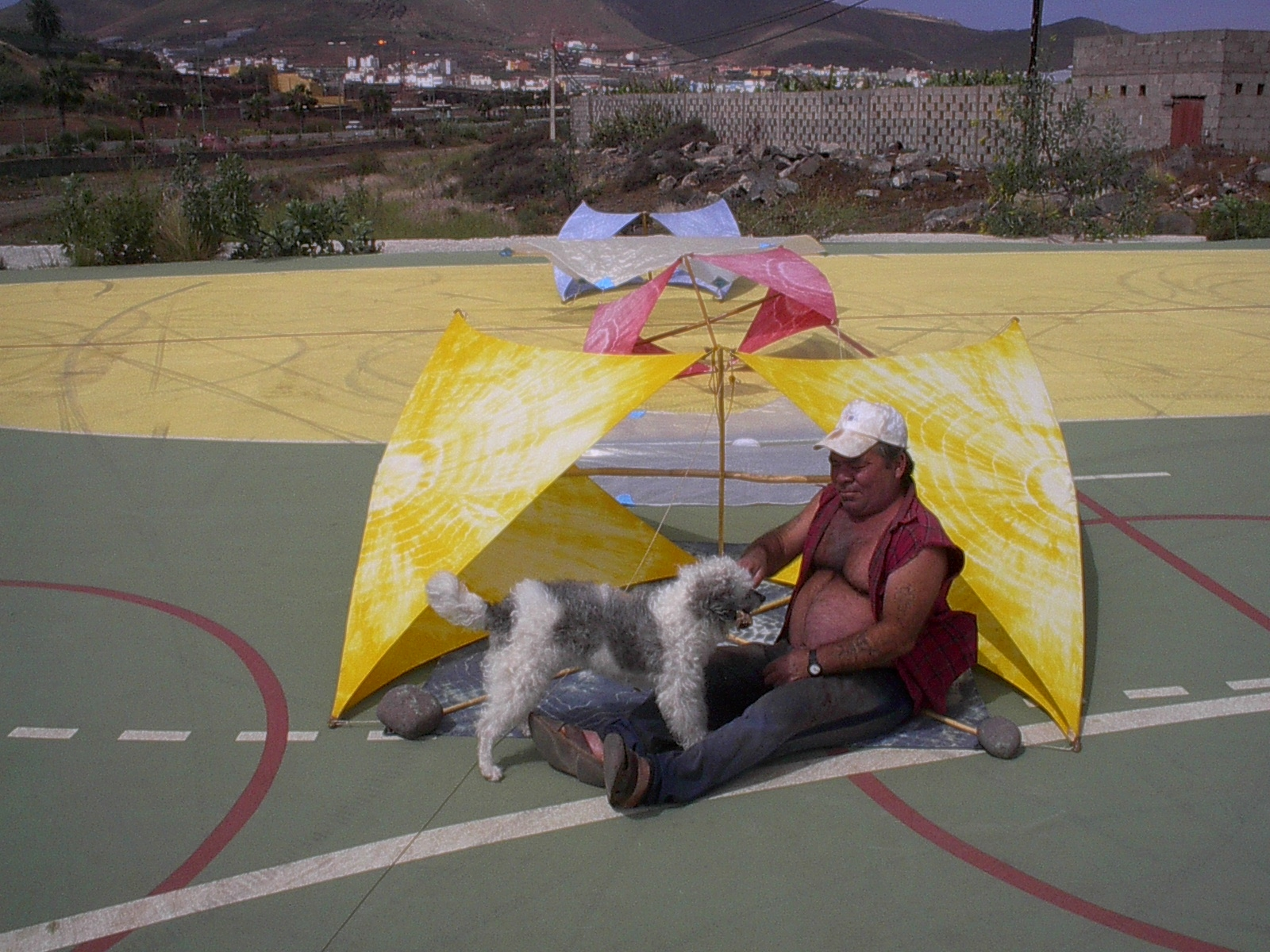
Resting during recreational kiting.

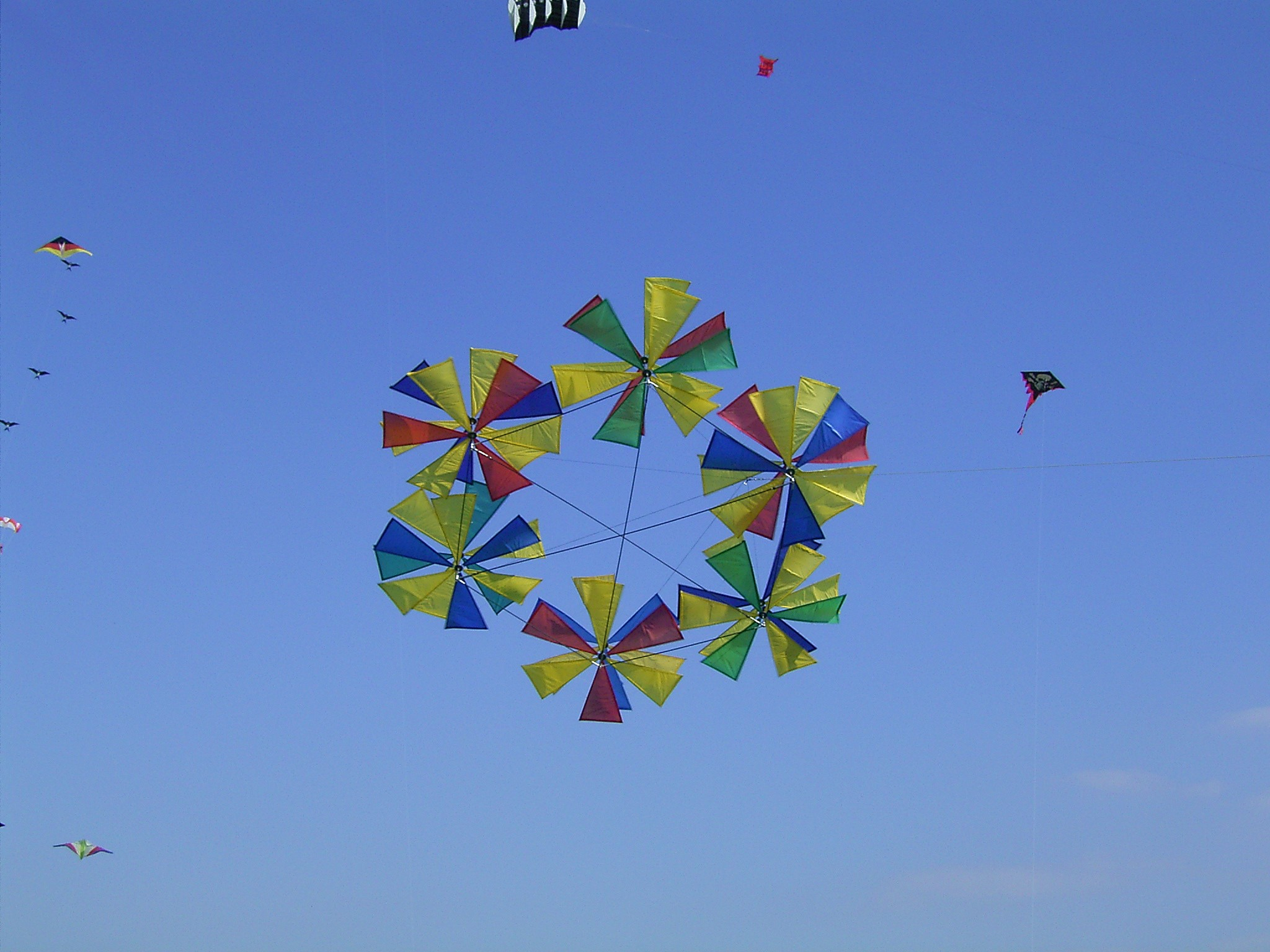
Recreationally meeting the challenge of designing something attractive, fun, interesting: hobby designer Frank Vincentz.

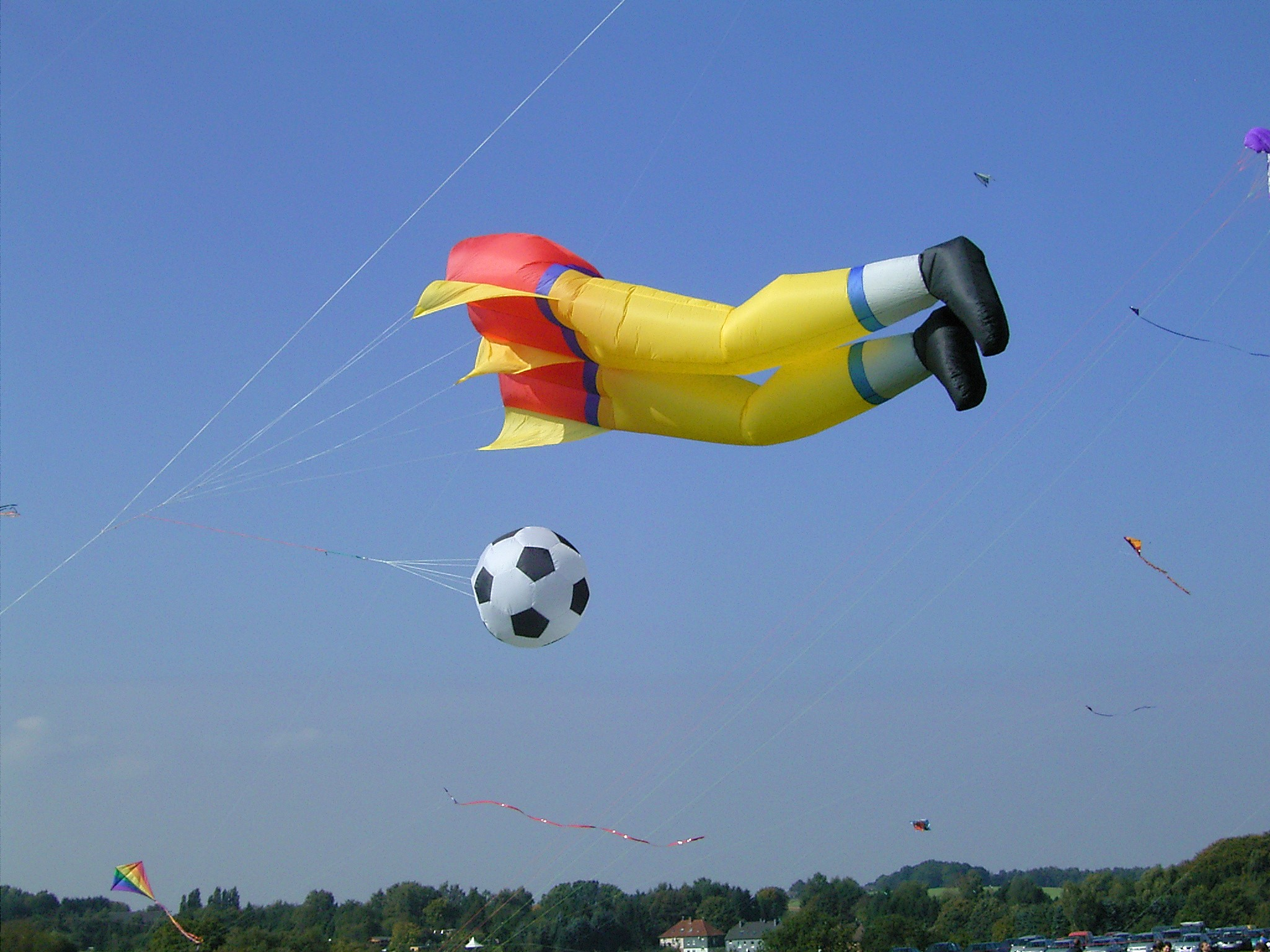
Frank Vincentz plays soccer in the sky for fun.

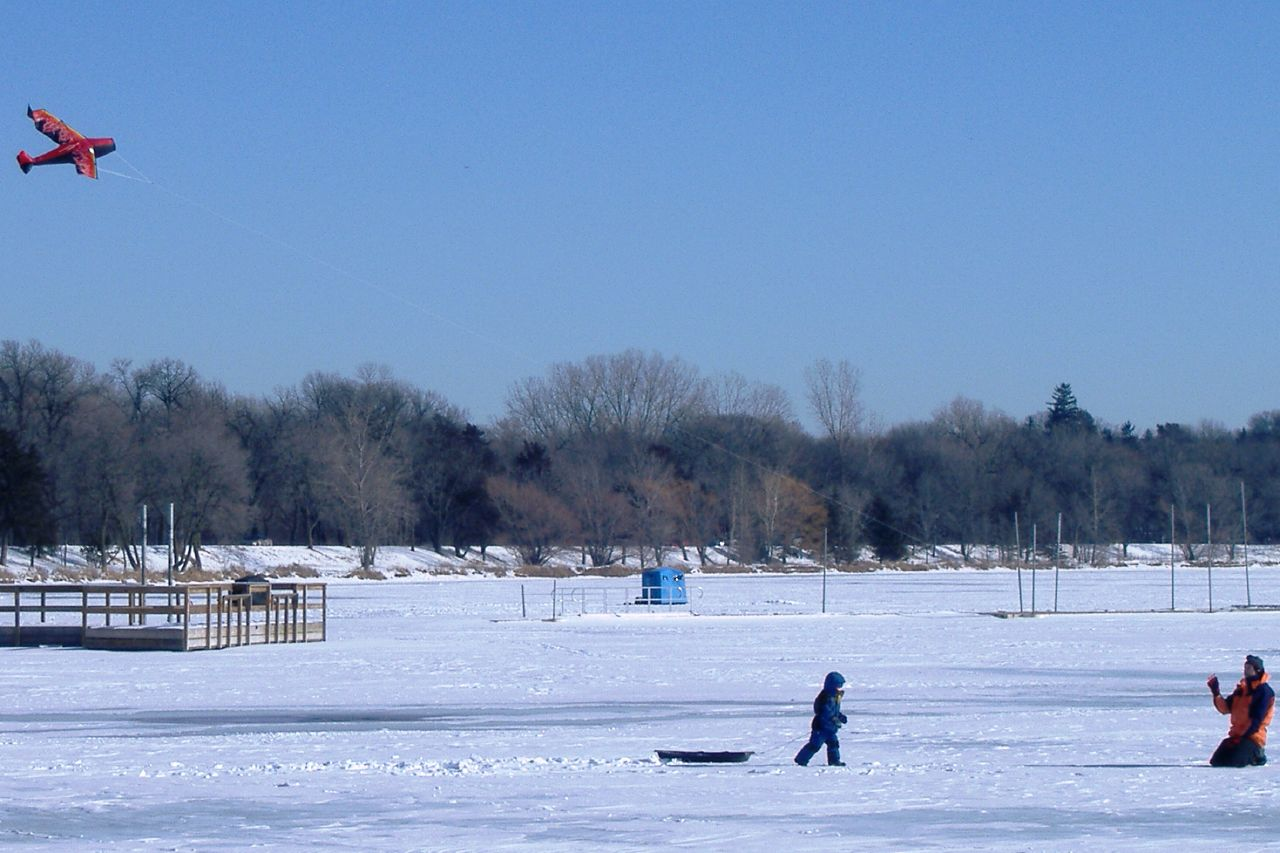
Winter playing on the ice.

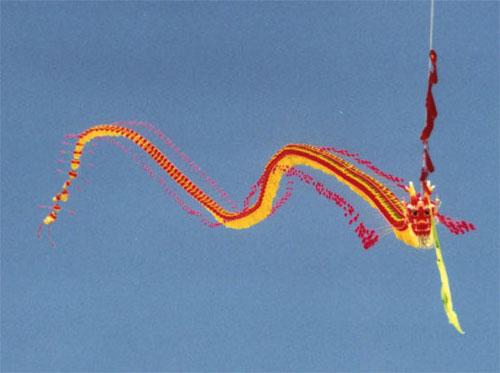
Chinese dragon kite more than one hundred feet long that flew in the annual Berkeley, California, kite festival in 2000.

=== Extreme sports ===
Kite boarding, kite surfing, kite buggying, kite buggy jumping, kite landboarding, freestyle kite landboarding, snow kiting or snowkiting, downhill speed kiting, hang gliding, and kite high jumping are among the extreme kite sports wherein competitions are held.

=== Competitive stunt-kiting ===
Peter Powell's development and promotion of two-line stunt kites or sport kites helped to move stunt kiting into a popular activity as well as a competitive sport. Also, the parafoil stunt kites feed the same sporting activity. Events for kites of more than two control lines are common. The four-line Revolution kite has been setting new standards in precision flying. Informal field competition and formal sport competition support a stunt-kite industry; seemingly endless refinements to the kite wing and kite line along with accessories continue unabated.

=== Kite fighting ===
A kite has two essential parts: wing and tether line. In kite fighting, the kite line plays a huge part in the activity. Sport kite fighting is perhaps 2000 years old; participation worldwide is high. North American Kite Fighter Association (NAFKA) Trawl-board and paravane innovator

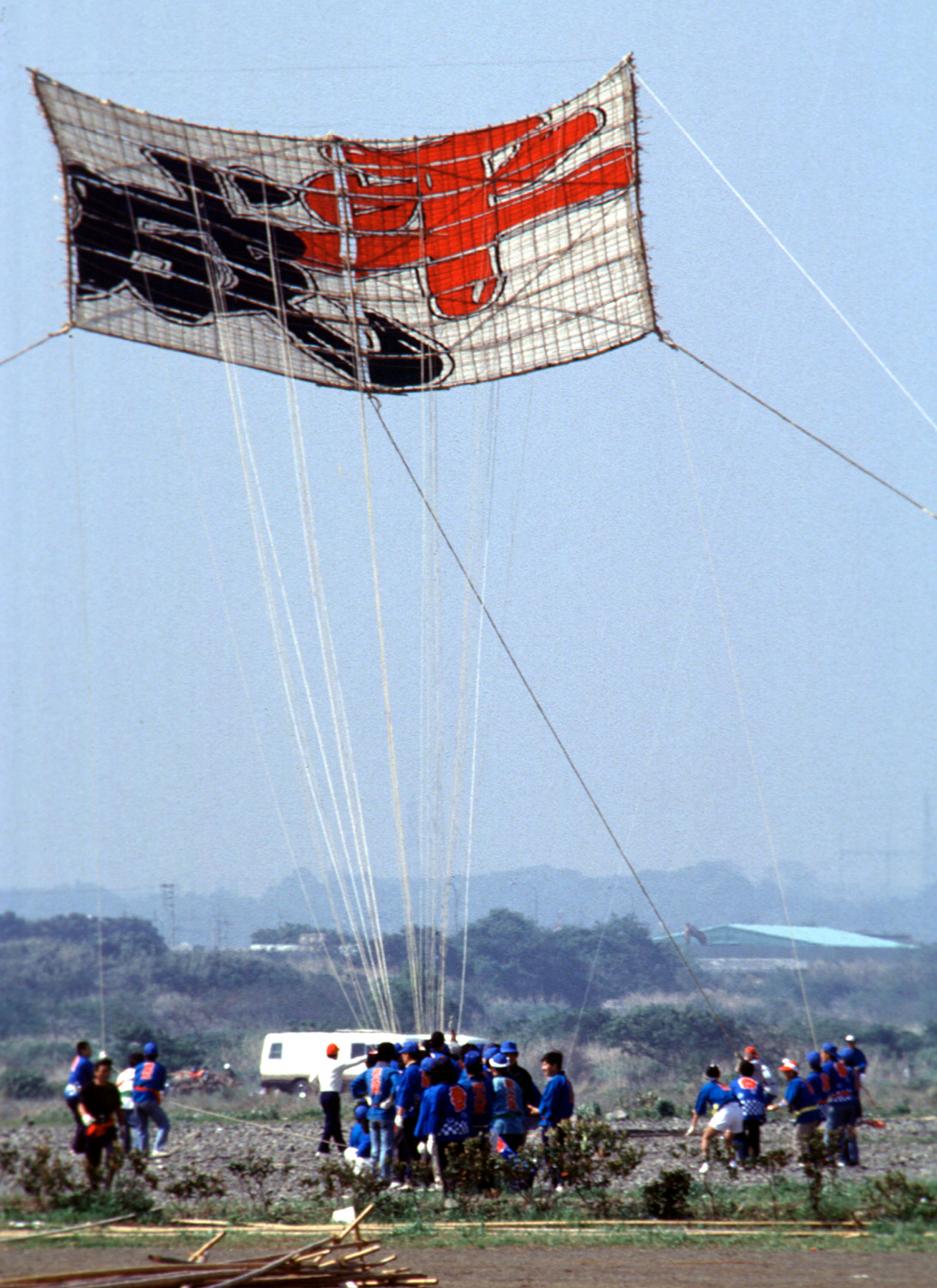
Kite festival, Kanagawa, Japan. May Kite festival, first attempt to fly 40' x 40' handmade kite. On the Sagami River. Teaming at a festival.

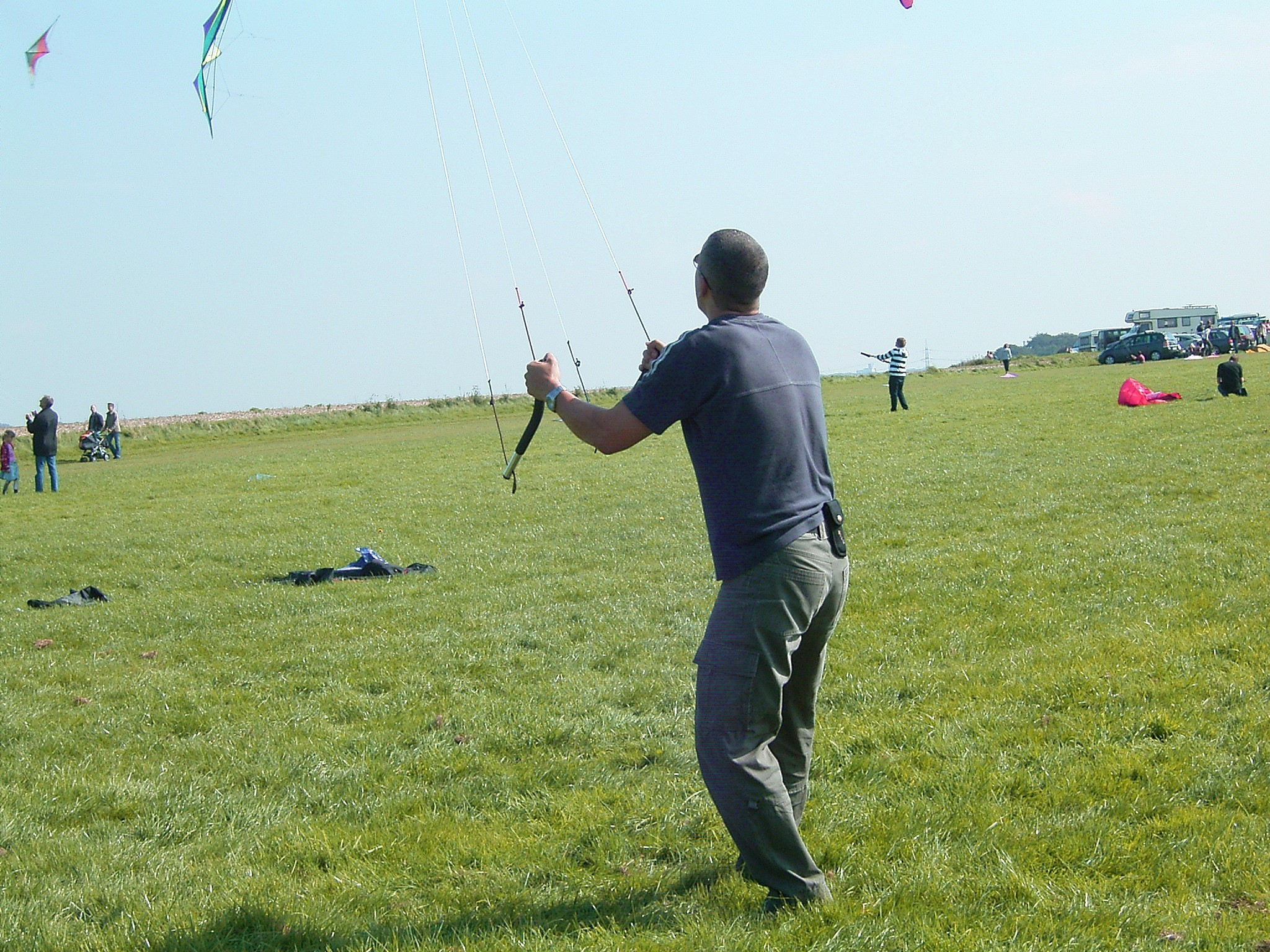
Kite festival in Heiligenhaus, Germany, 15./16. Sep. 2007 Source: self-made Date: created 16. Sep 2007 Author: Frank Vincentz

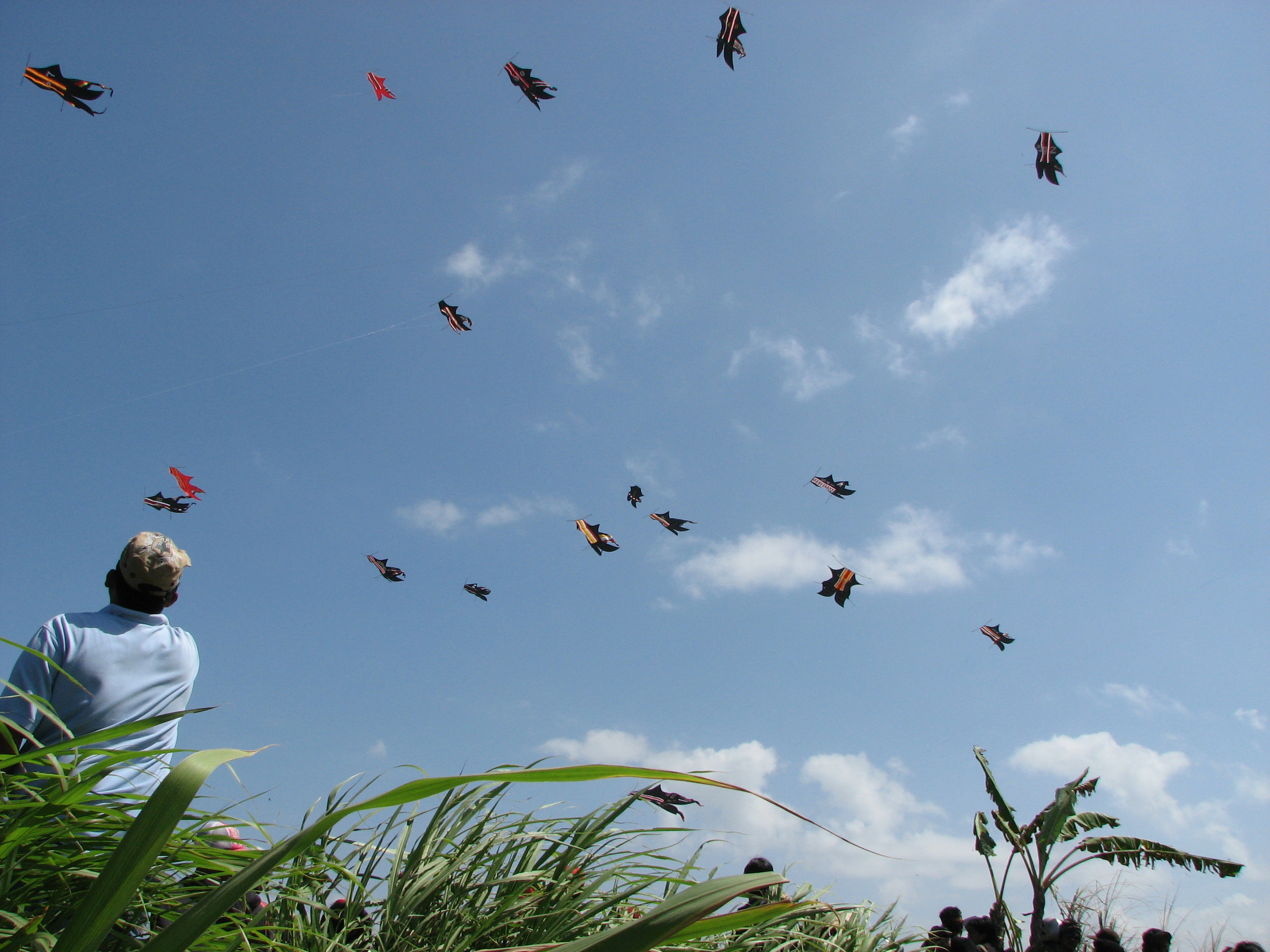
Bali Kite Festival (Padang Galak Beach)

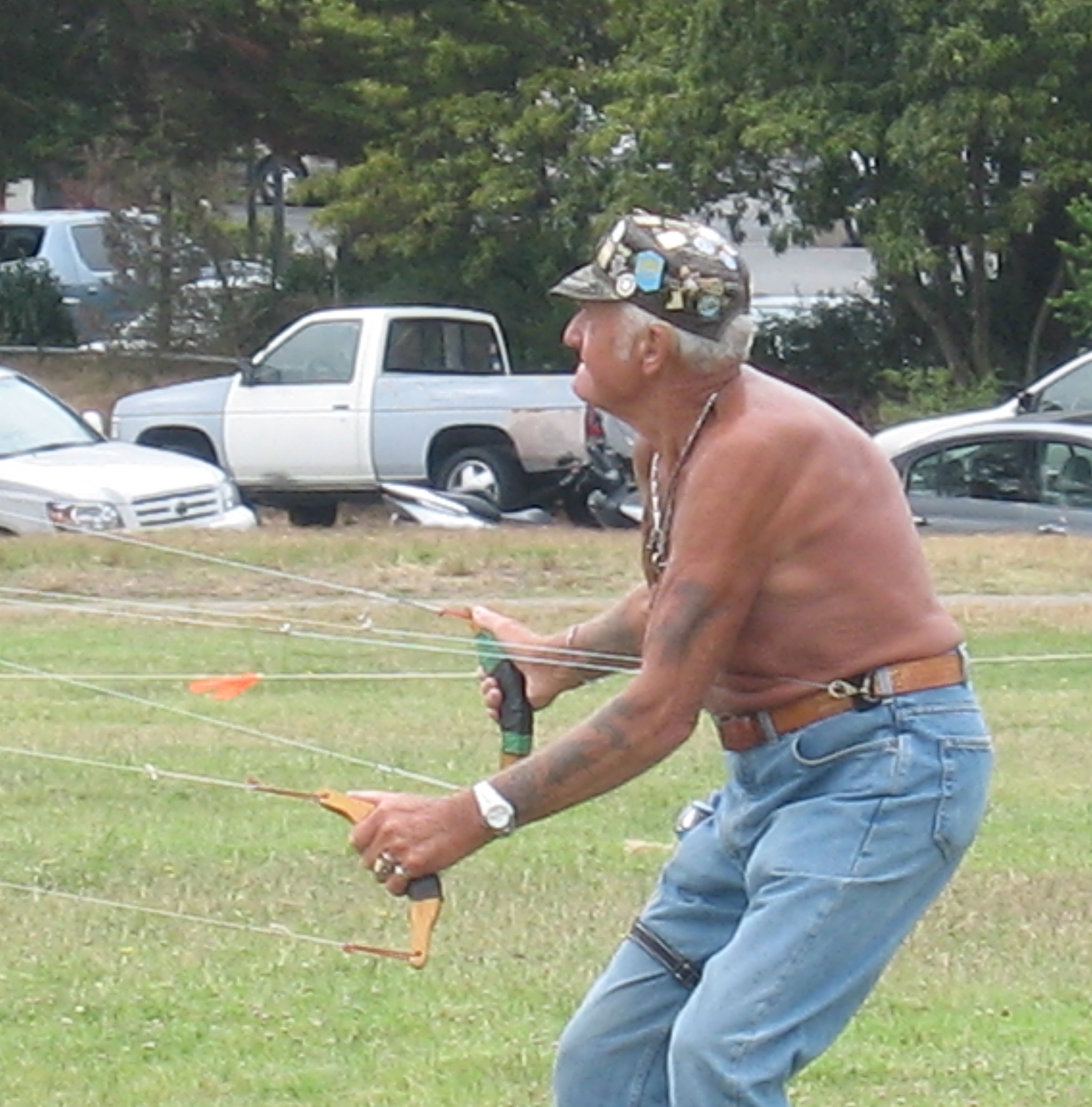
Professional kite flyer and aerial ballet master Ray Bethell performing at the Berkeley Kite Festival. This photo shows Ray flying three stunt kites simultaneously.

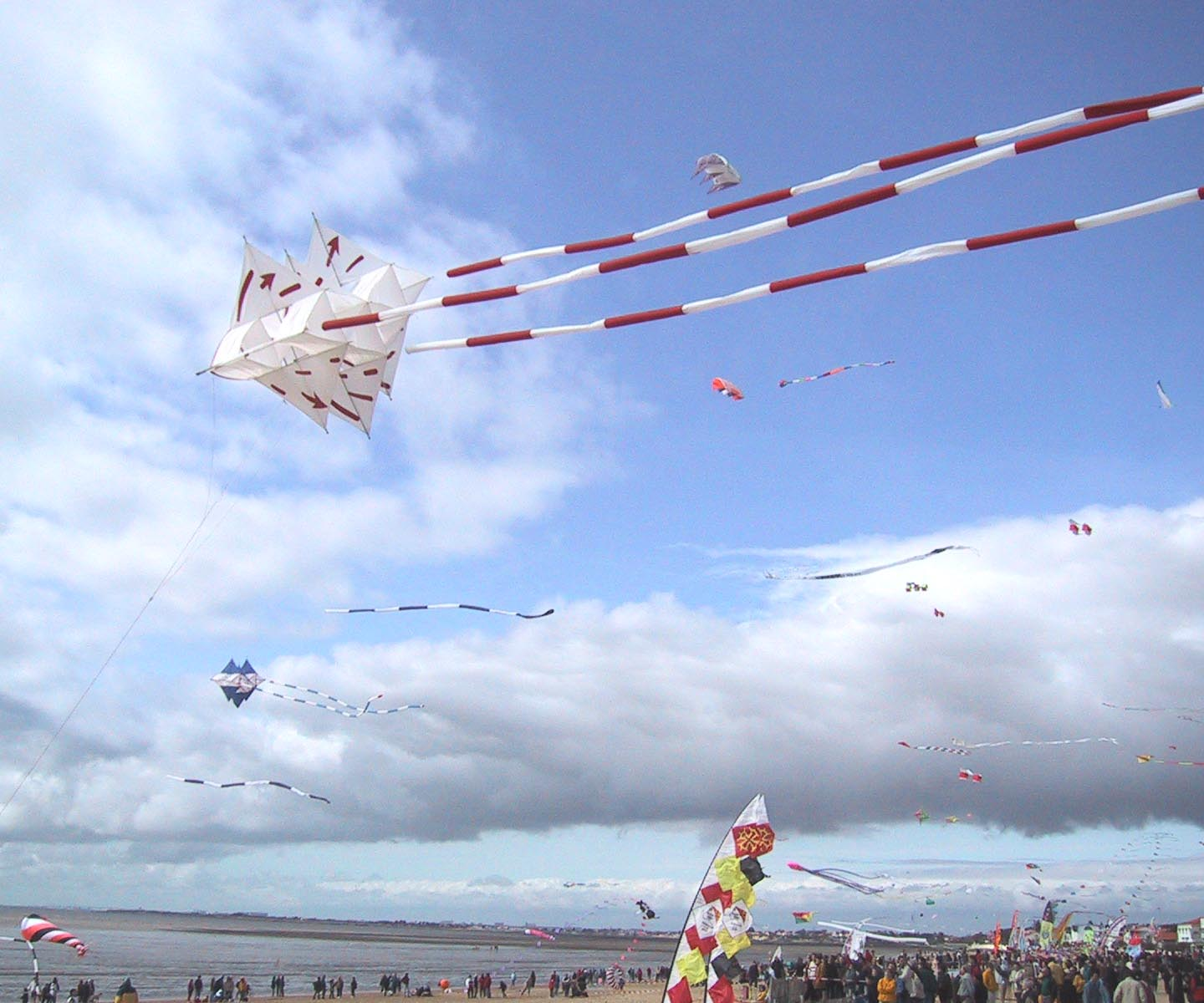
Kite festival at La Tremblade beach, Charente-Maritime (17), France. Festival de cerfs-volants sur la plage de la Tremblade en 2001.

Frequently kites are used to entertain observers. This application is part of recreational uses, but sometimes part of commercial uses.

=== Decoration ===
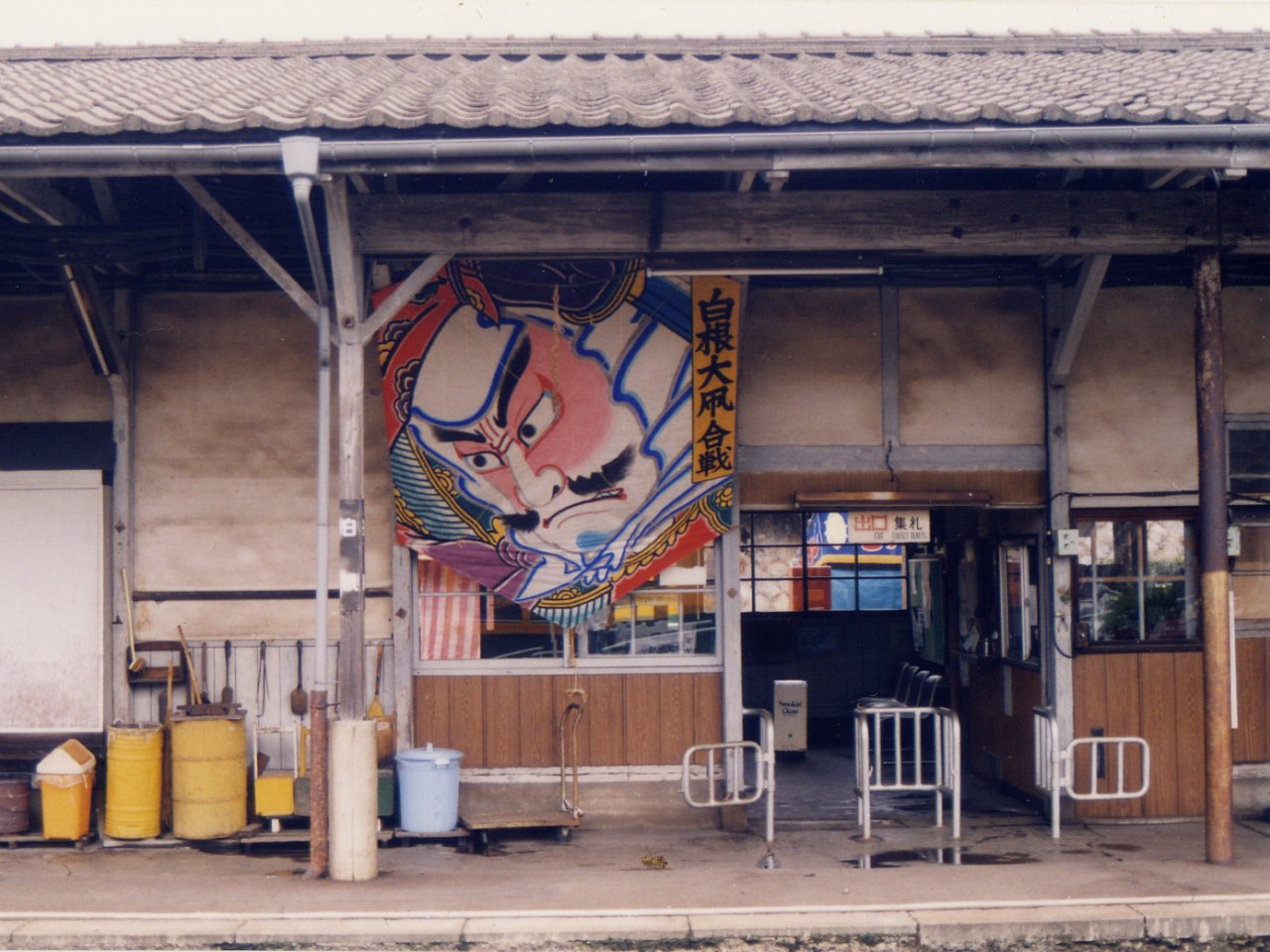
Train station decorates waiting platform.

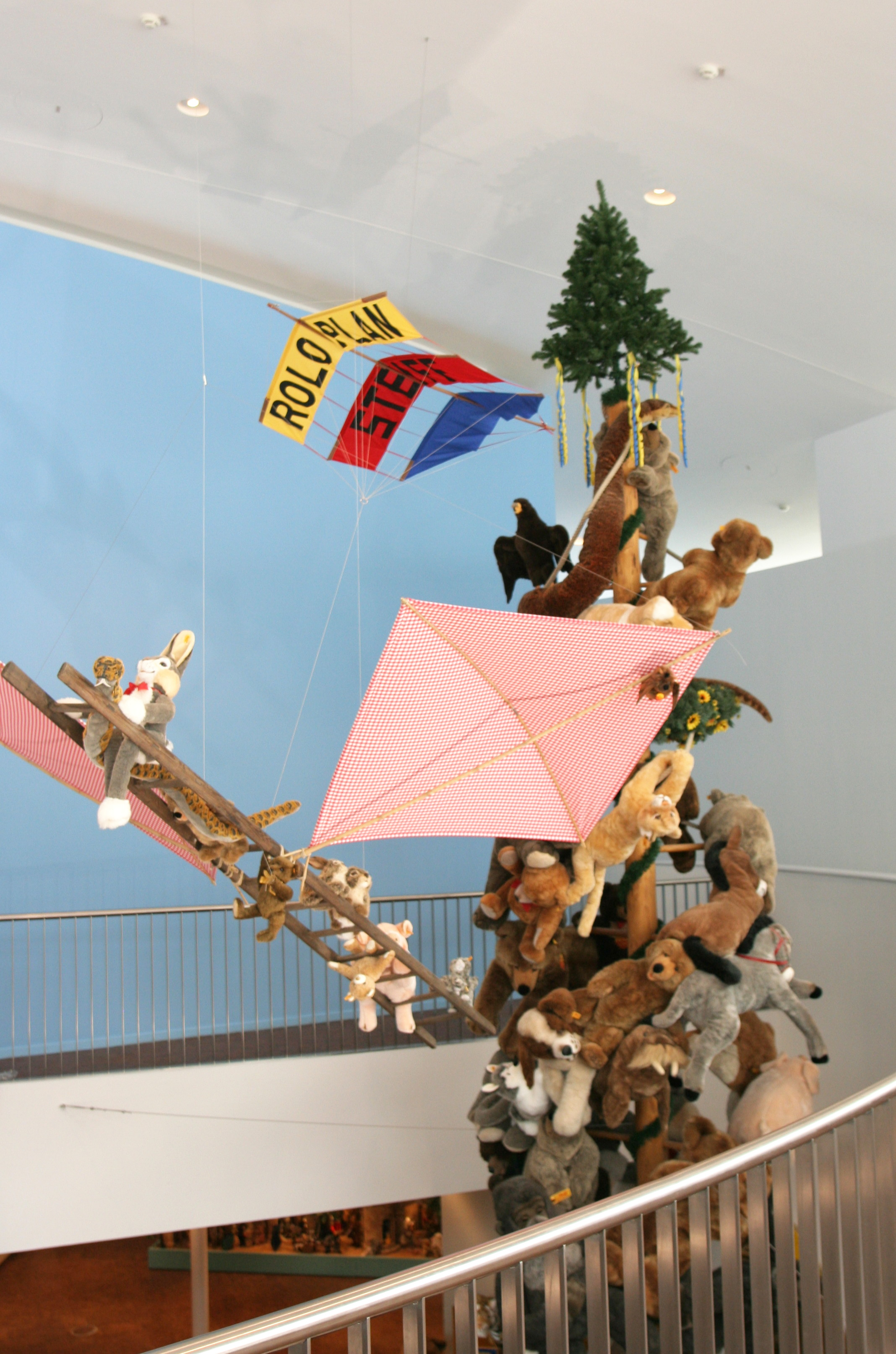
Roloplan and stuffed animals in the museum of Margarete Steiff company. Giengen Germany.

Still kites are hung decoratively in rooms of homes and businesses to set the tone of a home or selling environment.

== Fishing ==
=== Recreational, sport, and subsistence ===
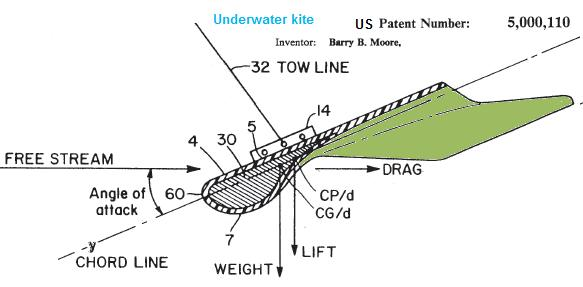
Tow-line depressing water kite

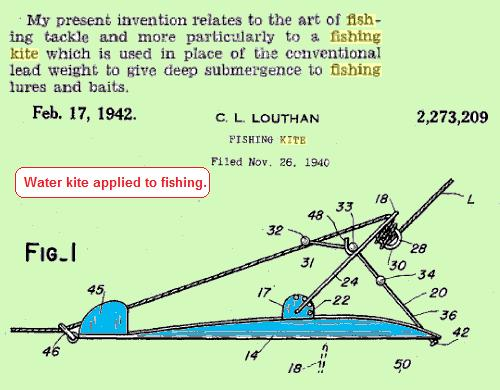
Water kite for fishing

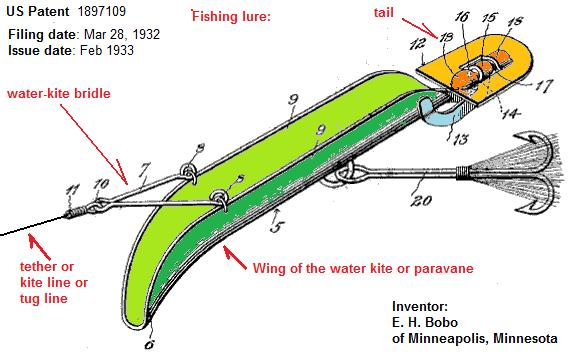
Water kite (paravane) as lure for fishing.

There are several ways kites are used in recreational and sport fishing, including lofting drop lines, control-kite trolling of bait, aerial photography of fishing environment using kites, and out and back cycles of trolling bait using a kite. Kites such as net-spreading underwater kites and soil kites (kiting anchors) are commonly used. Recreational fishing, commercial fishing, and scientific and military uses of depressors of tow lines use water kiting to accomplish the effects wanted. The Use of Kites for Fishing—George Webster wrote comprehensively on kite fishing. Jetty/Pier Fishing.; _ Paravanes for Sportfishing. A plan view of a Solomon islander's leaf fishing kite is shown in a photograph held by the Pitt-Rivers Museum is viewable at Natural History Magazine online; Pick from the Past, Natural History, April 1957: "Go Fly a Kite".

In Kite Fishing by the Salt-Water Natives of Mala or Malaita Island, British Solomon Islands T. W. Edge-Partington, leaf kites are described. The sago palm or ivory nut tree has leaves from which natives of Mala or Malaita Island made kites for fishing.

=== Commercial ===
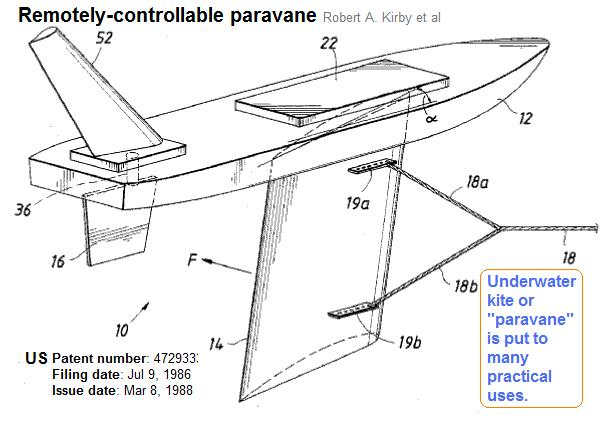
Water kite

Net-spreading underwater kites and kite vanes aid the control of large fishing nets. Remotely controllable paravane Robert A. Kirby et al.

== Military ==
Kites have been used for military uses in the past for signaling, delivery of munitions, free-flight kiting payloads from aircraft to ground positions, kiting troops to points where they could parachute to destinations, underwater kiting via paravanes to perform various underwater duties, lifting payloads from one point to another, raising rescue signals from rafts or stressed areas, raising communications antenna, and observation by lifting an observer above the field of battle, and by using kite aerial photography. Barrage kites have been used in both open frame kites and kytoon types to defend against enemy aircraft.

Kim Yu-Sin (or Kim Yushin), a Korean general, in 637 C.E. rallied his troops to defeat rebels by kite lofting a burning ball. Kites were also used by Admiral Yi of the Joseon Dynasty of Korea (1392–1897) . During the Japanese invasions of Korea (1592–1598), Admiral Yi commanded his navy with kites. His kites had specific markings directing his fleet to perform his order. Admiral Yi was said to have over 300 such kites. The war eventually resulted in a Chinese and Korean victory and the kites played a minor role in the war's conclusion.

In more modern times the British navy also used kites to haul human lookouts high into the air to see over the horizon and possibly the enemy ships, for example with the kite developed by Samuel Franklin Cody. Barrage kites were used to protect shipping during the Second World War. Kites and kytoons were used for lofting communications antenna. Submarines lofted observers in rotary kites. The Rogallo parawing kite and the Jalbert parafoil kite were used for governable parachutes (free-flying kites) to deliver troops and supplies.

== Science ==
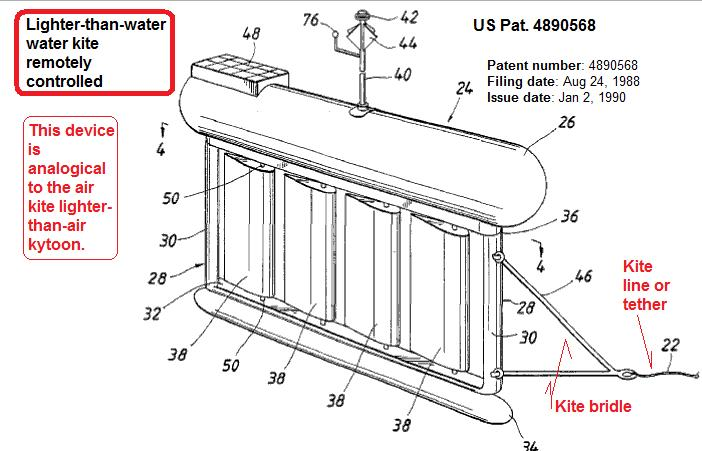
Lighter-than-water kite as tailing buoy

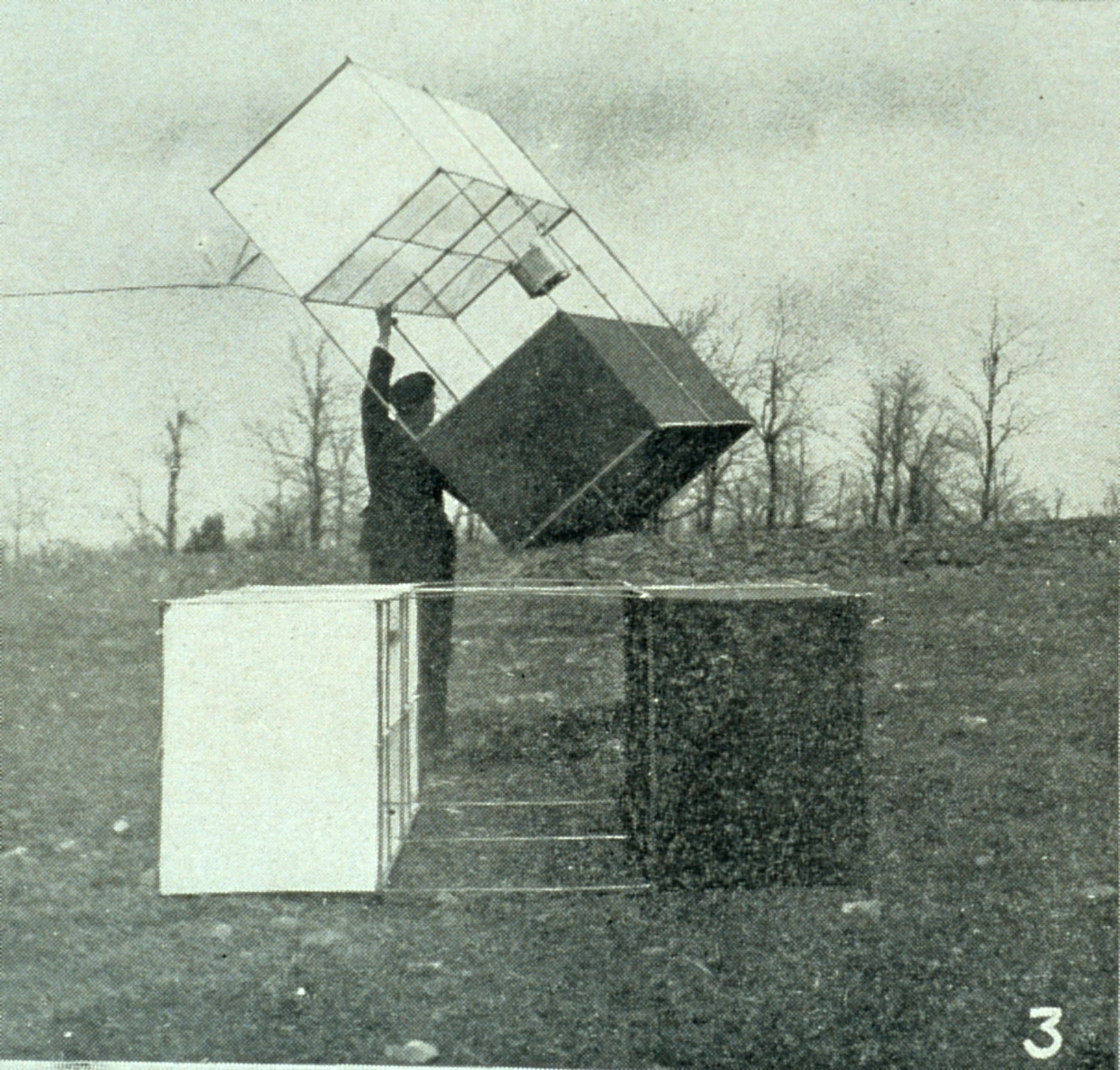
Kite of the US Weather Bureau carrying meteorograph c. 1910

Kites have been used for scientific purposes, such as Benjamin Franklin's famous experiment proving that lightning is electricity. Kites were the precursors to aircraft, and were instrumental in the development of early flying craft. Alexander Graham Bell experimented with very large man-lifting kites, as did the Wright brothers and Lawrence Hargrave. Kites had an historical role in lifting scientific instruments to measure atmospheric conditions for weather forecasting. Francis Ronalds and William Radcliffe Birt described a very stable kite at Kew Observatory as early as 1847 that was trialled for the purpose of supporting self-registering meteorological instruments at height.

Collecting kited spiders with kited nets: Kites are used to take samples of upper air and to collect things found in the upper air. The spiders that kite to disperse (so-called ballooning spiders) have been found in nets raised to upper air for collecting; the method is noted carefully in Spider Ballooning: Development and Evaluation of Field Trapping Methods (Araneae) Balloon kite of the so-called ballooning spiderlings; the spiders' kite is not a balloon.

=== Testing ===
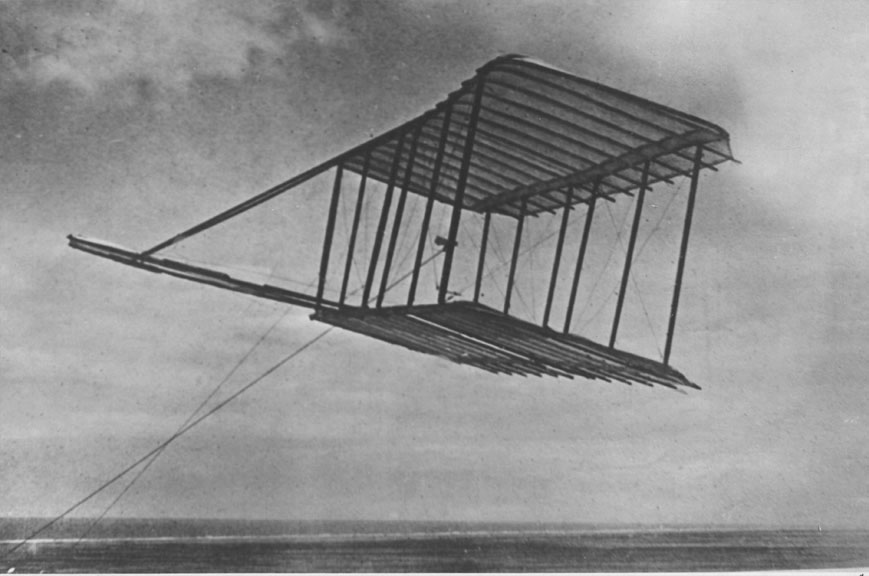
Wright kite with aim to get a powered aircraft.

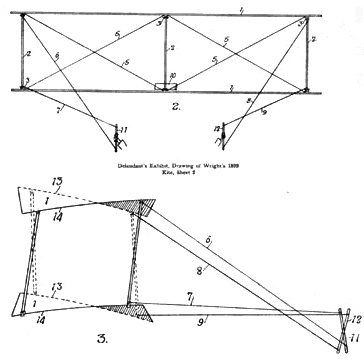
Early quad-line steerable kite by Wright Brothers as they aim for powered flight.

Kites were the precursors to aircraft and were instrumental in the development of early flying craft. Alexander Graham Bell experimented with gigantic man-lifting kites, as did the Wright brothers and Lawrence Hargrave.

== Industrial ==
=== Energy generation ===
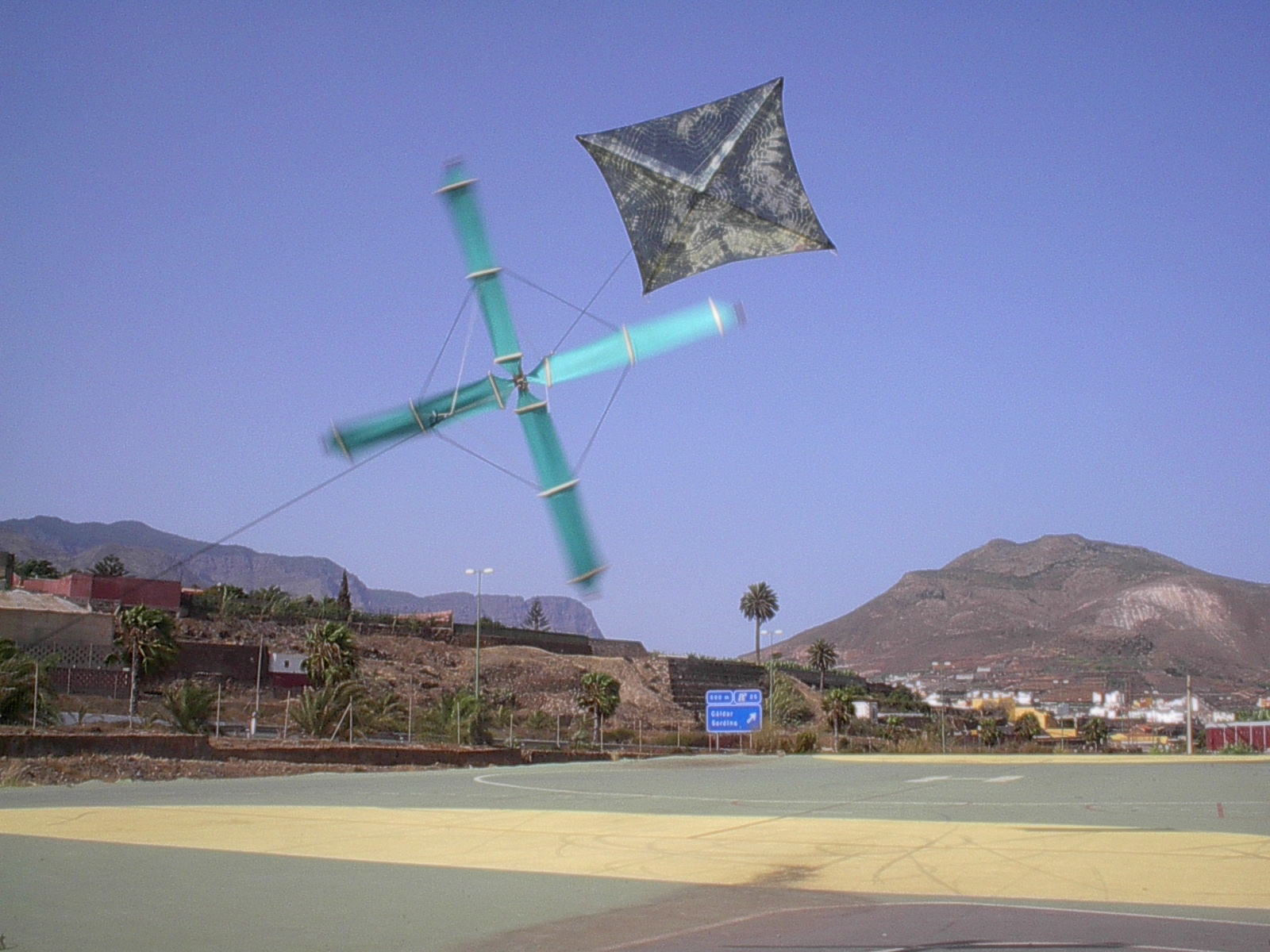
Kite lofts wind-driven rotating wings

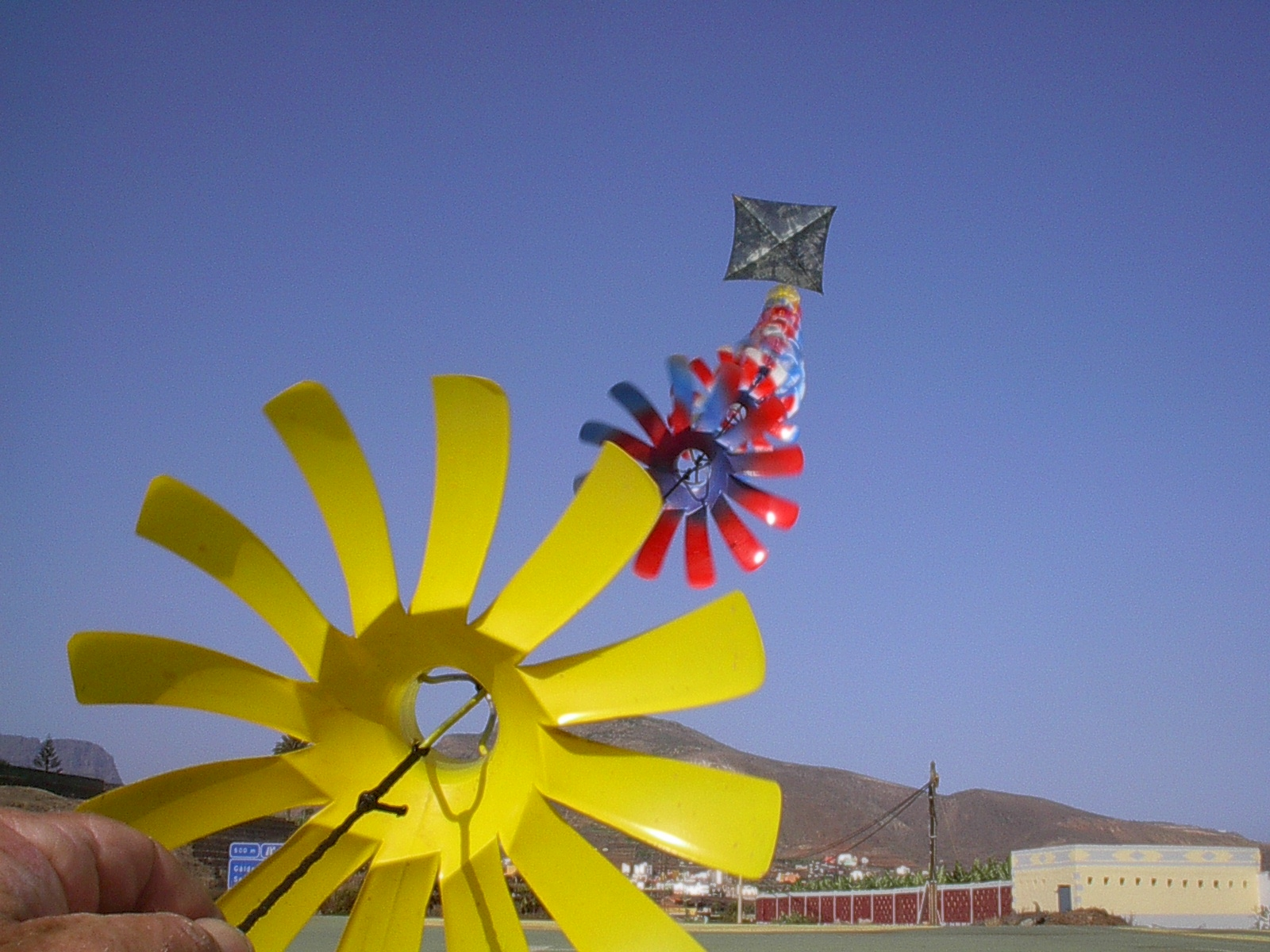
More rotation.

Both air and hydro kites are used to generate electricity; the kite is set in the stream of air or water; various schemes are used to extract some of the stream's energy for converting that energy to electricity.

A major research and development project called Makani Power, based in California and funded by Google.org, is investigating the use of kites in harnessing high altitude wind currents to generate electricity.

Tidal kites operate underwater, using the tidal stream's greater mass to generate far more electricity than available in wind-borne environments.

Video links for generating electricity by using kites:

- Over 700 kite-energy videos within the AWES industry are collected and open for free view to the public through the AWES Museum.
- Back and forth taking kite generates electricity:.
- MagGenn (Magnus-effect kite wind generator): a Magnus-effect rotating kite electricity generation system: Magenn Power, Inc.;
- NTS GmbH is German company developing X-Wind technology. This technology assembles three existing technologies into X-Wind Plant : Kites, track system and servo motor to steer the kites.
- KiteGen (kite generator). Italian company is working on several methods of generating electricity from kite systems. One key method is the "stem" system.High altitude wind power: an era of abundance?
- Makani Power's 10 kW test platform autonomously generating power:.

=== Radio aerials and light beacons ===
Kites can be used for radio purposes, by kites carrying antennas for MF, LF or VLF-transmitters. This method was used for the reception station of the first transatlantic transmission by Marconi. Captive balloons may be more convenient for such experiments, because kite carried antennas require a lot of wind, which may be not always possible with heavy equipment and a ground conductor. It must be taken into account during experiments, that a conductor carried by a kite can lead to a high voltage toward ground, which can endanger people and equipment, if suitable precautions (grounding through resistors or a parallel resonant-circuit tuned to transmission frequency) are not taken.

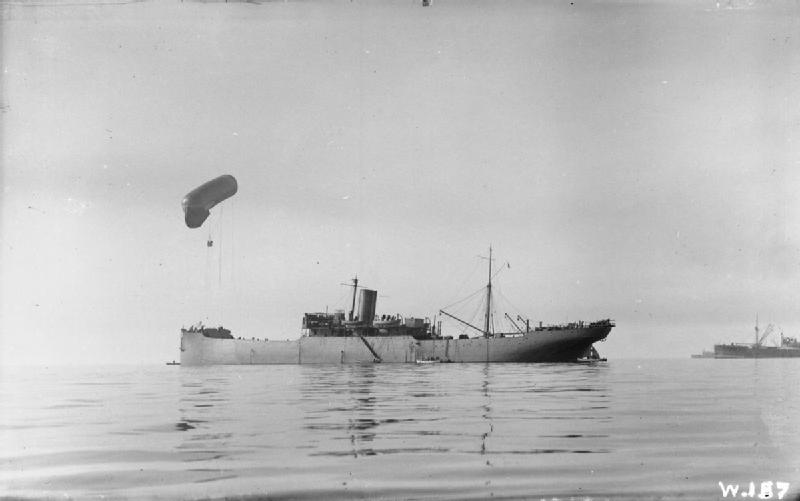
Antenna raising in 1915. The kite balloon ship HMS CANNING anchored off Salonika with kite balloon aloft, November 1915.

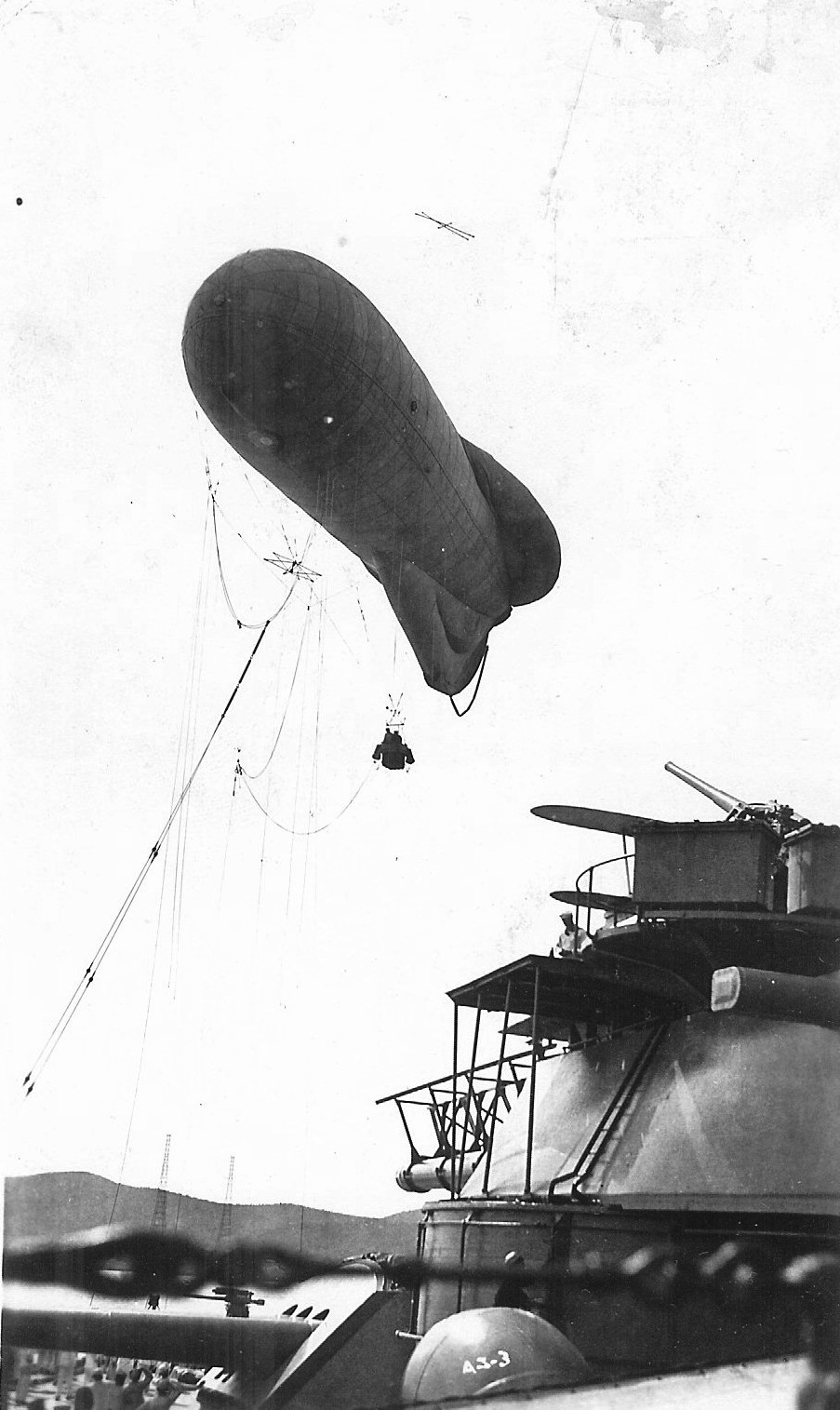
Kytoon equipped ship. US Navy photo. A kite balloon has been deployed from the USS Arizona. The kite balloon has a two-man crew.

Kites for Lifting Antennas

Kites can be used to carry light effects such as lightsticks or battery powered lights.

== In nature ==
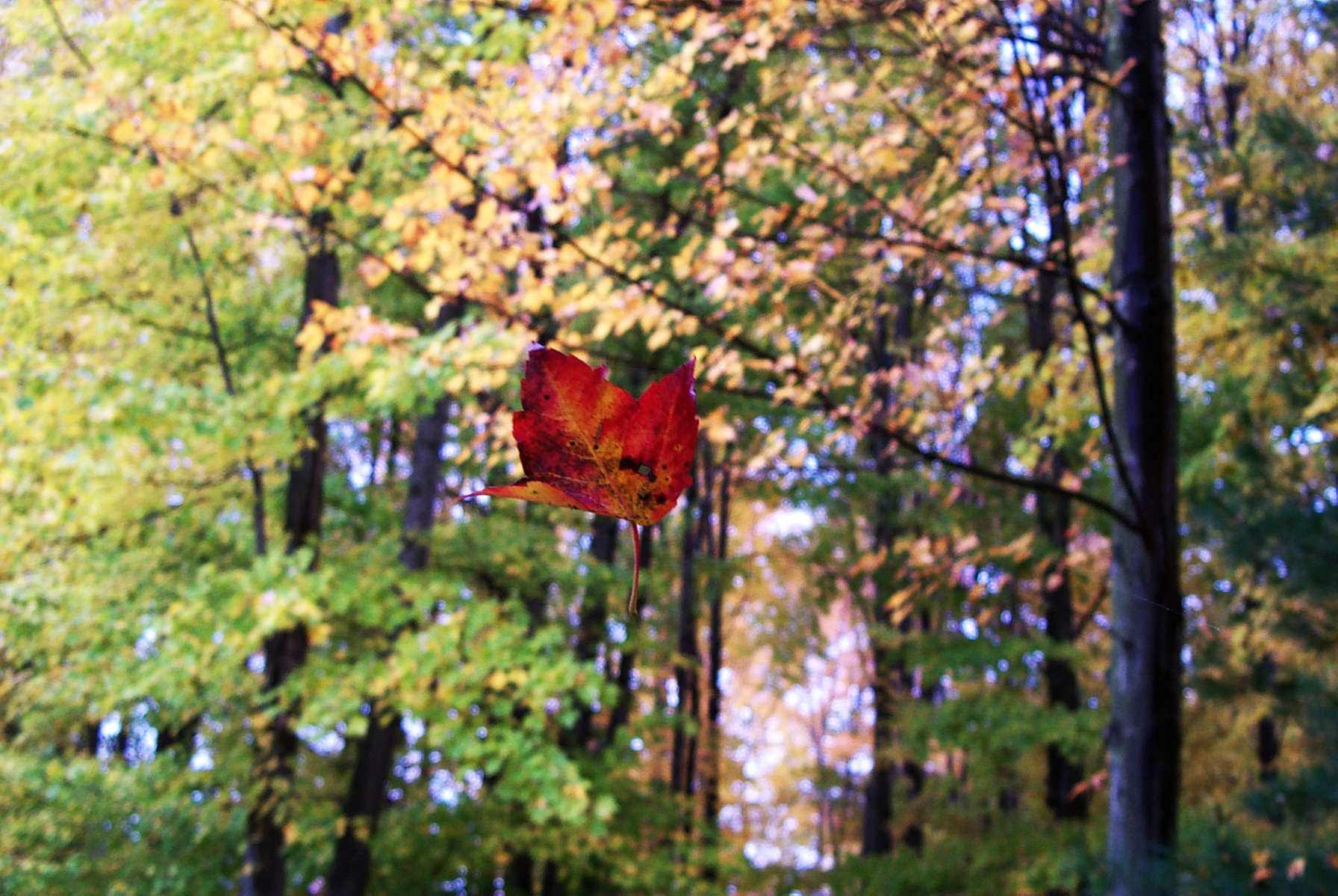
Leaf tethered in breeze by spider web.

There are natural kites that play a part in shaping what happens on earth. Some leaves kite to relieve wind pressures, pump fluids, and to disconnect annually to fertilize the soils. Poet Pablo Rosenblueth expressed his understanding that children see leaves as kites. Poet Marvin Bell recognized leaves are kites in his Nightworks: Poems 1962–2000. The leaf wafts in the wind held by the tethered leaf stem; when it is fall time, the leaf stem has a de-mooring disconnect process; the wind then easily interacts with the leaf to cause it to fly off the trees and into a gliding fall to the ground. There is a following of kite makers that bridle leaves to fly them again as kites.

=== Spiders ===
Billions of spiders use kiting to travel, disperse or to build bridge lines for their webs. Spiders hanging in the moving air on their silks are deflected to various points where they make anchor points for web building. Carol Frost, biology researcher of the University of Alberta, Canada, observed kiting in spiderlings.

== See also ==
- Ballooning (spider)
- Foilboard
- Hang gliding
- Kite line
- Kite mooring
- Kite rig
- Kite types
- Kiteboarding
- Land sailing
- Power kite
- Rigid kite (airborne wind energy)
- Sit-down hydrofoil
- Snowkiting
- Wakeboarding
