= Kite rig =

Wind-assisted propulsion system

Kite rigs are wind-assisted propulsion systems for propelling a vehicle. They differ from conventional sails in that they are flown from kite control lines, not supported by masts.

Vehicles driven by kites include boats, buggies, and vehicles with snow and ice runners. They may be as simple as a person flying a kite while standing on a specialized skateboard, or be large, complex systems fixed to the vehicle, with powered and automated controls. They have recreational and commercial uses.

== Structure ==
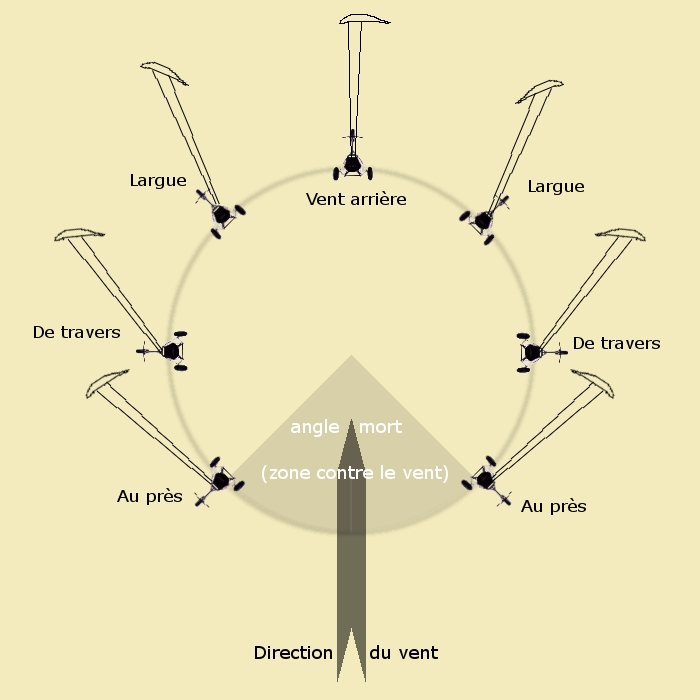
Points of sail with a kite buggy.

Current kite rigs can be sailed within 50 degrees of the wind. This allows them to sail upwind by tacking.

A power kite is held at an angle to the wind using control lines. Like any other sail, the kite develops lift and drag, pulling the vessel. The vector of the kite's pull is added to the forces produced by the vessel (water resistance against the hull, force of wheels against the ground, etc.) to move the vessel in the desired direction.

Windspeed increases with height, allowing kites to develop substantially more thrust per unit area than a conventional sail. Winds are also steadier and less turbulent higher up.

Kites may be adjusted with respect to the wind, manually or by an automated system. A kite cannot stay aloft when there is no wind, and must be re-launched.

== Applications ==
=== Solo sports ===
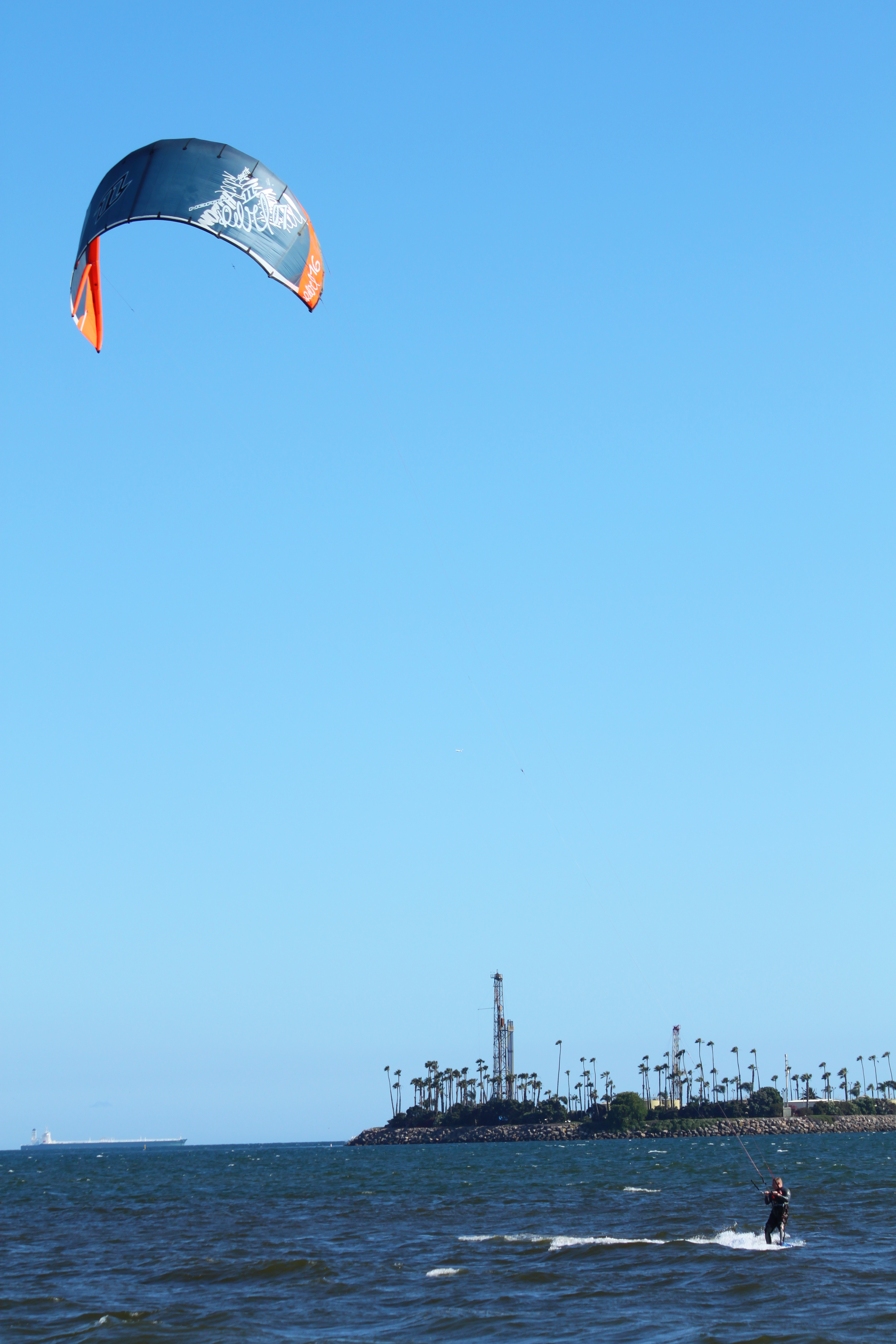
A kitesurfer off Long Beach, California, USA

Kite rigs power a variety of recreational conveyances on water and land. On water, kites are used to power surf-board-like boards in the sport of kitesurfing. Kiteboating is done in boats with kite rigs. On land, kite landboarding derives the same mode of power for skate-board-like boards. Over snow, kites power snowboards or skis in the sport of snowkiting. Traction kites for solosports generally have an area of 1-16 square meters, with anything over ~5 square meters being a big kite that requires expertise.

=== Ships ===
Ship-pulling kites run to hundreds of square meters of area and require a special attachment points, a launch and recovery system, and fly-by-wire controls.

The SkySails propulsion system consists of a large foil kite, an electronic control system for the kite, and an automatic system to retract the kite.

The kite, while 1–2 orders of magnitude larger, bears similarities to the arc kites used in kitesurfing. However, the kite is an inflatable rather than a ram-air kite. Additionally, a control pod is used rather than direct tension on multiple kite control lines; only one line runs the full distance from kite to ship, with the bridle lines running from kite to control pod. Power to the pod is provided by cables embedded in the line; the same line also carries commands to the control pod from the ship.

The kite is launched and recovered by an animated mast or arm, which grips the kite by its leading edge. The mast also inflates and deflates the kite. When not in use, mast and deflated kite fold away.

==== Use ====
A commercial cargo ship, the MS Beluga Skysails, was built, and launched in 2007, with a kite rig supplementing conventional propulsion. A European Union-funded four-year study of wind propulsion, using the MS Beluga Skysails, reported that the ship attained 5% fuel savings overall, which translated into 530 tonnes (530 t; 580 short tons) of CO_{2} for a typical year and itinerary. The study concluded that 25,000 similarly equipped ships could reduce fuel consumption by 5.6–8.1 megatonnes (5.6–8.1 Mt; 6,200,000–8,900,000 short tons) and save 170–25 megatonnes (170–25 Mt; 187,000,000–28,000,000 short tons) of CO_{2}, 45–65 kilotonnes (45–65 kt; 50,000–72,000 short tons) of NO_{x}. The return on investment for installing a kite sail was estimated to be about two-three years. On her maiden voyage, MS Beluga Skysails saved an estimated 10–15% fuel, $1,000 to $1,500 per day, while the kite was in use.

Maartje Theadora, a large fishing trawler, was retrofitted with a kite rig in 2010.

== Companies ==
Skysails and KiteShip both made kite rigs.

== See also ==
- Fore-and-aft rig
- High altitude wind power
- Kite applications § Cargo
- Kite buggy
- Kite ice skating
- Kite landboarding
- Kite rollerskating
- Kiteboating
- Kitesurfing
- Power kite
- Sail plan
- SkySails
- Snowkiting
- Square rig
