= SkySails =

Wind energy manufacturer

SkySails Group GmbH
- Founded: 2001; 25 years ago
- Founders: Stephan Wrage; Thomas Meyer
- Headquarters: Hamburg, Germany
- Number of employees: 150 (2021)
- Website: https://skysails-power.com

SkySails Group GmbH is a Hamburg-based company that sells kite rigs to propel cargo ships, large yachts and fishing vessels by wind energy as well as airborne wind energy systems for electricity production from high-altitude winds.

== Business ==
SkySails Group GmbH is a successor company to SkySails GmbH, which was founded in 2001 by Stephan Wrage and Thomas Meyer in Hamburg.

The company, while technically successful at cutting shipping costs and carbon emissions, has faced economic difficulties. Head of business development Henning Kuehl has said:

There's a structural problem slowing down the process: ship owners (who have to make the investment) often don't pay for the fuel – that's the charterer's duty. The charterer on the other side doesn't charter the ship for long enough a period to make low-carbon technologies pay back.

The lack of carbon emissions regulations for shipping and low fuel prices have added to these difficulties.

In the weak economy of 2012, a time of low investment by shipping companies, the company laid off half of its 80 employees. On March 7, 2016, SkySails GmbH, as part of the SkySails Group, was forced to file for insolvency and was dissolved on April 5, 2016. Since then, SkySails Group GmbH, as the successor company, has continued business operations and has developed a further business area in the form of the SkySails Power division.

The company's headquarters are in Hamburg. The assembly of ground stations of the airborne wind energy systems takes place in Lower-Saxony.

== Towing system for ships ==
=== Technology ===
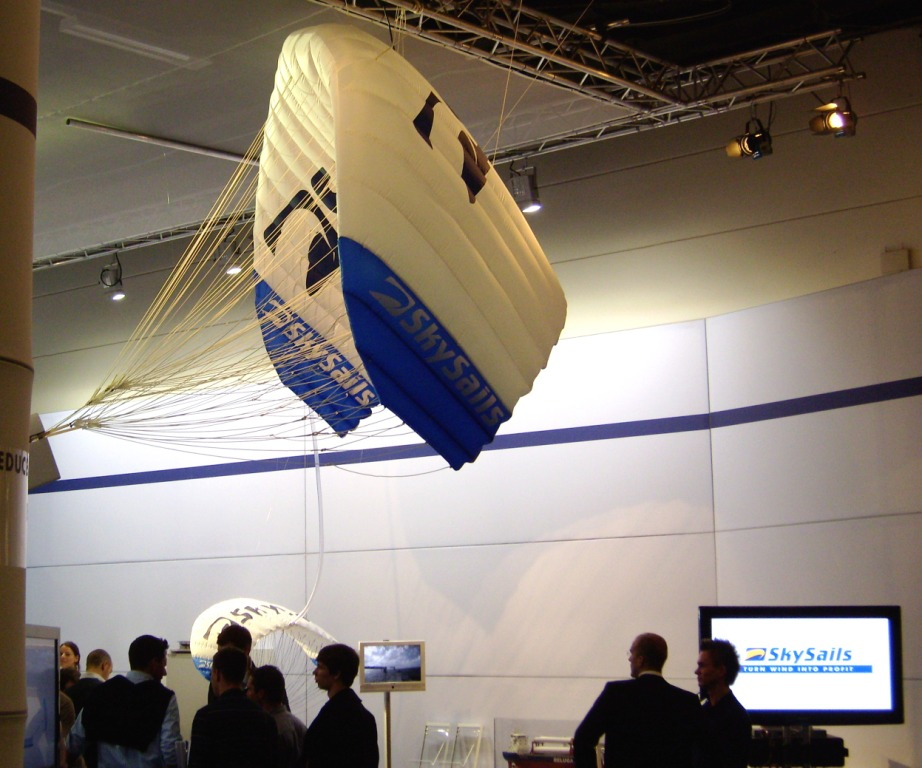
An exhibition kite. Production kites have areas of hundreds of square meters.

The SkySails propulsion system consists of an automatically controlled foil kite of some hundreds of square meters, an electronic control system for the kite, and an automatic system to retract the kite.

The ram-air kite, while 1-2 orders of magnitude larger, bears similarities to the arc kites used in kitesurfing. For multiple reasons, ram-air kites give many times the thrust per unit area of conventional mast-mounted sails. Additionally, a control pod is used rather than direct tension on multiple kite control lines; only one line runs the full distance from kite to ship, with the bridle lines running from kite to control pod. Power to the pod is provided by cables embedded in the line; the same line also carries commands to the control pod from the ship.

The kite is launched and recovered by an animated mast or arm, which grips the kite by its leading edge. The mast also inflates and deflates the kite. When not in use, mast and deflated kite fold away.

A conventional ship with a SkySails system burns less fuel, and has two propulsion methods, making it a type of hybrid vehicle. SkySails' kite propulsion from upper wind power is a traction use of high altitude wind power. Up to 100 million tons of carbon emissions every year could be saved by widespread use of SkySails technology, according to the International Maritime Organization.

Other companies, such as California-based KiteShip, have built similar technology.

=== Operational history ===
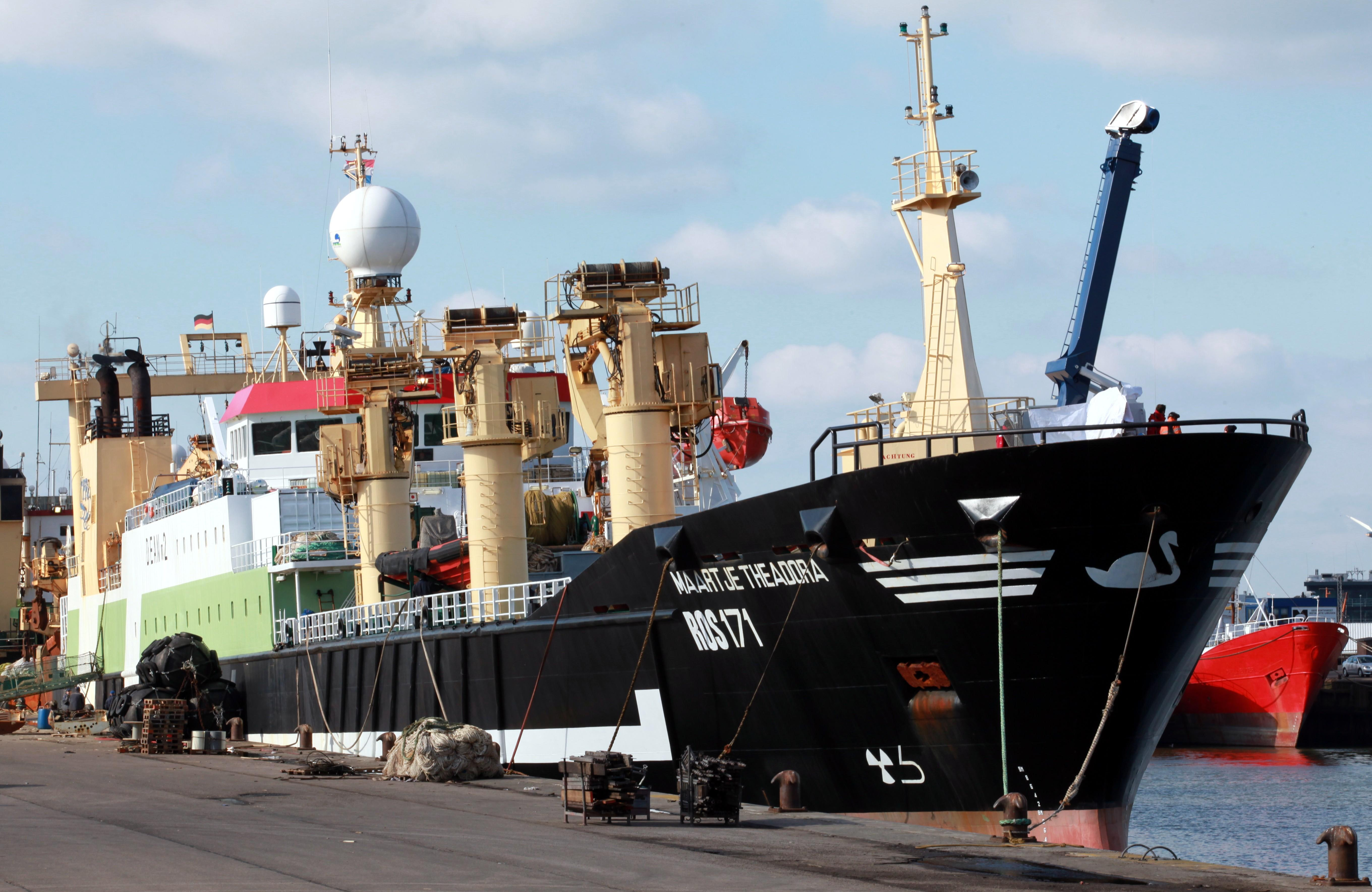
Maartje Theadora in port, showing a SkySails attachment arm on bow.

The Wessels Shipping Company entered into a partnership with SkySails to pilot and test the system on their ship MV Micheal A. in 2007. They then ordered further systems, the first of which was retrofitted to the MV Theseus.

MS Beluga SkySails was the first ship to be built to use the system, and the first using a production model. The 132 m, 10,000 tonne vessel was fitted with a 160-square-metre (1,700 sq ft) kite and launched 17 December 2007 and departed the northern German port of Bremerhaven to Guanta, Venezuela in January 2008.

The ship completed its journey on 13 March 2008 after sailing from Germany to Venezuela, then to the United States, and ultimately arriving in Norway. While the kite was in use, the ship saved an estimated 10-15% fuel, $1,000 to $1,500 per day.

The annual savings in consumption on windy routes is on the order of about 5.5%, as determined by the EU-funded Life project WINTECC (duration four years).

In early 2010, the company announced that it had sold one of its 160m² systems to be installed on the Maartje Theadora, the first application of the SkySails system on a fishing trawler. The vessel is described as Germany's largest fishing ship, and the kite is expected to reduce fuel costs on the runs to fishing grounds along the African coasts or the South Pacific.

The systems save fuel, and reduce carbon emissions and shipping costs, but have not been widely adopted.

== Airborne wind energy systems ==
SkySails Power GmbH was founded in 2015 for the development of airborne wind energy systems. A pilot plant in Schleswig-Holstein has been in operation since the end of 2019.

=== Technology ===
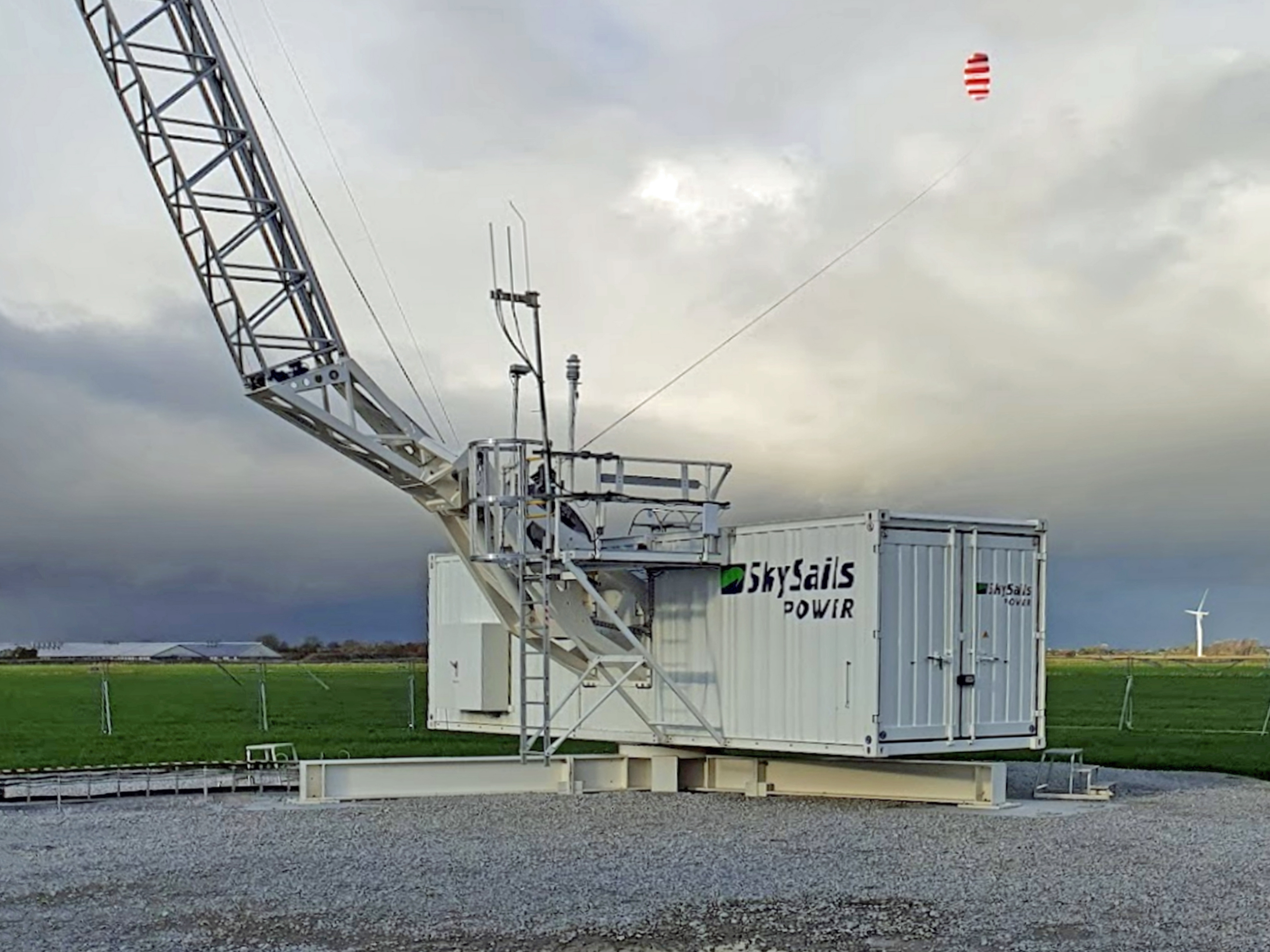
Airborne wind energy system.

Driven by the wind, the automatically controlled power kite rises in figures of eight. As it gains altitude, it unwinds a tether from a winch on the ground. The tractive force drives a generator inside the winch that produces electricity. Once the tether has reached its maximum extension of 800 meters, the autopilot steers the kite into a neutral position with minimal drag and lift. While consuming only a fraction of the energy generated before, the generator now acts as a motor and reels-in the tether. The system continuously repeats this process, flying the kite at an altitude of 200 to 400 meters. Energy generated by the Airborne Wind Energy System can be fed into the grid, stored in batteries, or directly consumed.

=== Pilot project "SkyPower100" ===
The airborne wind energy unit in Schleswig-Holstein was built as part of the joint research project "SkyPower100", funded by the German Federal Ministry for Economic Affairs and Energy and involving SkySails Power GmbH, EnBW Energie Baden-Württemberg AG, Omexom Renewable Energies Offshore GmbH and Leibniz Universität Hannover. From the operation of the airborne wind energy system, the consortium intends to gain knowledge for the further development and scaling of airborne wind energy systems as well as on environmental influences, safety aspects and licensing requirements. This includes, for example, expert opinions on noise emissions, avifauna and air traffic safety.

== Literature ==
- Reinhard Elsner, Michael Schlaak et al. (Fachhochschule Oldenburg/Ostfriesland/Wilhelmshaven): Testergebnisse des SkySails-Systems. (Test results of the SkySails system.) In: Schiff & Hafen, Volume 1/2009, Pages 36–40, 43
- Reinhard Elsner, Michael Schlaak et al. (Fachhochschule Oldenburg/Ostfriesland/Wilhelmshaven): Einsparungspotenziale in der Welthandelsflotte. (Potential savings in the global merchant fleet) In: Schiff & Hafen, Volume 6/2009, Pages 74–81.
- K.-H. Hochhaus: STG-Sprechtag »Innovative Schiffe« in Kiel. (STG consultation day "Innovative Ships" in Kiel) In: Hansa, Volume 4/2010, Pages 44–47,
- SkySails startet kommerzielle Vermarktung. (SkySails launches commercial marketing.) In: Schiff & Hafen, Volume 5/2011, Page 36.

== See also ==
- Kite rig
- Kite applications#Cargo
- High altitude wind power
- Rigid kite (airborne wind energy)
- Sailing ships
