= MS Onego Deusto =

Partially wind-powered German cargo ship

History

Netherlands
- Name: Onego Deusto
- Owner: Onego Deusto BV
- Builder: Volharding Shipyards, Harlingen, Netherlands
- Launched: 17 December 2007
- Acquired: 1 January 2008
- Maiden voyage: Bremerhaven – Venezuela
- Renamed: 2019
- Identification: IMO number: 9399129

General characteristics
- Type: Cargo ship
- Length: 132 m (433 ft)
- Beam: 15.8 m (52 ft)
- Draught: 7.73 m (25.4 ft)
- Sail plan: one 160 m^{2} (1,700 sq ft) power kite
- Speed: 15.5 knots (28.7 km/h)
- Capacity: 474 TEU or 228 FEU + 18 TEU

MS Onego Deusto (christened Beluga SkySails) is a commercial container cargo ship. It is the world's first ship partially powered by a computer-controlled kite rig, called the SkySails system. It consists of a kite similar to a huge paraglider of up to 160 square metres (1,700 sq ft) area.

== Kite power ==
The kite has an area of 160 square metres (1,700 sq ft) and reduces fuel consumption by 15–20% on average; it was set to be upgraded to 320 square metres (3,400 sq ft) in order to increase fuel savings by about 30%.

Stephan Wrage, managing director of SkySails GmbH – which installed the kite – announced: "During the next few months we will finally be able to prove that our technology works in practice and significantly reduces fuel consumption and emissions." Verena Frank, project manager at Beluga Shipping GmbH, SkySails GmbH's partner, further stated that "the project's core concept was using wind energy as auxiliary propulsion power and using wind as a free of charge energy".

This kite is connected to the ship by a cable, and controlled by an automatic pod of actuators to maximize the wind benefits. The kite functions at an altitude between 100 metres (330 ft) and 500 metres (1,600 ft).

By using this system it is possible to improve the speed of the ship and reduce fuel consumption. SkySails calculates that the use of its technology worldwide could reduce carbon dioxide emissions by more than 146 million tons (about 0.6% of the entire global energy-related emissions of CO_{2}). SkySails estimates the potential upgrade market for its system at more than 40,000 ships. Through 2013, the company was targeting less than 1% of that market – about 400 ships.

During an evaluation performed between 2006 and 2009, the kite mounted on MS Beluga Skysails was estimated to achieve 5% fuel savings on an average route mix, and up to 10-12% fuel savings on North Atlantic and North Pacific routes.

== Launch ==
The ship, owned by the German firm Beluga Fleet Management GmbH, a subsidiary of Beluga Shipping GmbH within the Beluga Group, was launched 17 December 2007 and left the northern German port of Bremerhaven to Guanta, Venezuela on January 22, 2008. The ship was carrying cargo for DHL which sponsored the initiative.

== United States Navy charter ==
On October 6, 2008, the United States Naval Military Sealift Command announced it had chartered the Beluga Skysails to transport Army and Air Force supplies from three European ports of call to the United States.
