= Kite line =

Twine or specialized line for flying kites

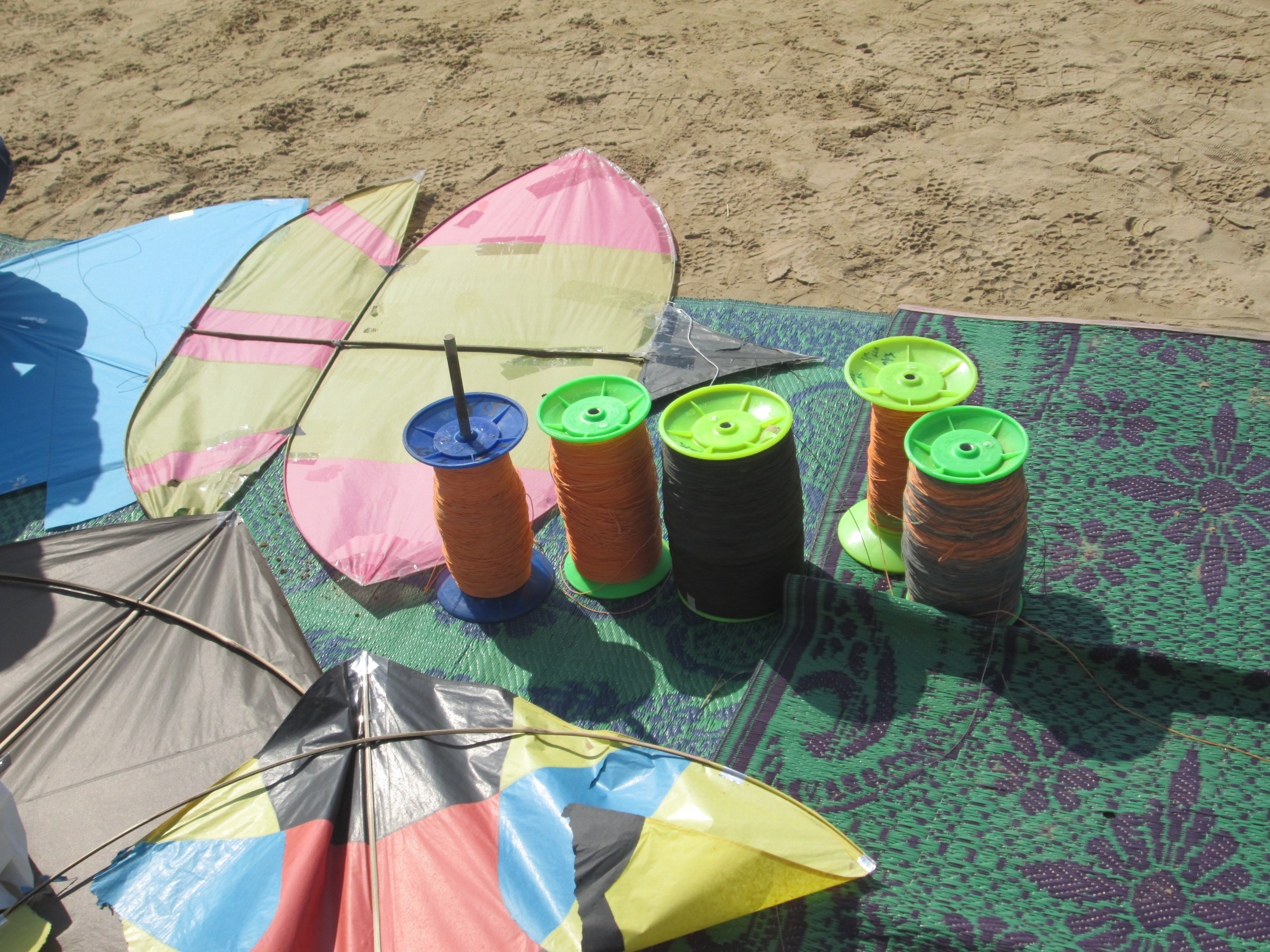
A set of kite lines

In kiting, a line is the string or thin cord made of cotton, nylon, silk, or wire, which connects the kite to the person operating it or an anchor. Kites have a set of wings, a set of anchors, and a set of lines coupling the wings with the anchors. Kite lines perform various roles: bridle, control, tug, or special duty.

== Applications ==
Successful kiting in particular kite applications depends in large part on the kite line's specifications and handling. The integrity of kite lines is affected by wear, reeling, contact with chemicals, loss of strength from knottings, ultraviolet rays of the sun, repeated cycles of use, and damaging actions during use.

There are historically classic specifications of kite lines. Kite lines for small toy kites differ greatly from kite lines used for kite tugs that pull commercial cargo ships across the ocean. Sport kites using kite line sets of two or three or four lines at a time have a need for very low stretch in the lines. Single-line recreation kite lines may do well with stretchy kite lines. Kite-fighting kites' main tether lines have sharp glass particles bonded to the line. Kite lines misused or abused can cause injury to persons and property. Kite lines vary in pricing and availability. Repair of a particular line has its own arts.

Reeling, handling, and storage methods differ for lines depending on the kite applications. Kite lines terminate at the kite's wing/bridle at one end and at some kite mooring at the other end; the mooring is to some object anchor that provides the tug or tension against the resultant of the lift and drag forces of the kite; the anchor is always powered by something even if that something is the Earth's moving surface relative to the air for air kites; a running human kite operator is the source of human powering.

== Kite-line parameters ==
Depending on the kite application and kite system needs, selecting a kite line will consider one or more of the following parameters: availability, base material, color, density, mass per length, size, manufacturer's reports, serial number or product number, diameter, cross-section shape, tensile strength new, aged tensile strength, resistance damage from chemicals, defects, safety factor, resistance to damage from solar radiation (UV stabilization), electrical conductivity, optical conductivity, heat conductivity, moisture intake from water (via humidity, rain, contact with liquid water), buoyancy in water, abrasion resistance, nature of manufacturer's line joins, feel, degradation from knotting, terminal methods, elasticity, structure, signal transmission capacity, visibility to radar, performance over time, maintenance actions, effect on performance from hours of use, drag, negative lift, auxiliary line uses, performance when being reeled under tension, performance when tensed line touches itself, action upon breaking, memory, veil, sleeving, inspectability, surface finish, reaction to heat and cold, taper (as wanted), flexibility, reeling behavior, breaking strength, critical diameter, reliability, test-results portfolio, visibility, twist, plasticity, safety, price.

Toy kites sold with a manufacturer's selected line makes the decision easy; the decision is more challenging for custom kite applications. For example, the design and handling of the piano-wire kite line for the high-altitude meteorological observations (1749–1933) was a keen engineering process.

== Children's toy kites ==
To avoid burns and cuts, kite lines for children toy kites are frequently soft, fuzzy, cotton twine.

== Sport control kites ==
Some kites are controlled by multiple lines. Low-stretch lines have a stable length and give more responsive control. Kite lines can be dyed, for show and to simplify control line management, either by the manufacturer or the enduser. Melting point is considered when controlling a kite for kite fighting; lower cost cotton line can melt a crossed expensive synthetic line.

== High altitude attempts ==
Historically, high altitude kite flights were made by atmospheric scientists and meteorologists in the late 19th to early 20th centuries. Routine flights around the world were made using steel wire with single kites and kite trains. The highest recorded flight was made by a German meteorological station at Lindenberg in 1919. It is reported that the top kite reached 31,955 ft above the launch point. The line was over 20 km of high tensile steel piano wire with a breaking strength varying between 134 and 225 kg.

In 2014 the single-line single-kite altitude world record was made using a kite line of Ultra High Molecular Weight Polyethylene (UHMWPE, Dyneema) with 300 pound breaking-strength. Robert Moore and his team used 12,400 metres of line to fly a 12 square metre kite to 16,009 feet above the launch point. Dyneema, a braided Ultra High Molecular Weight Polyethylene (UHMWPE) line, and the identically structured line, Spectra, are stronger and lighter than Kevlar for a given diameter. One of the most important characteristics of line for high altitude kite flying is small diameter and high strength to weight ratio. The greatest barrier to high altitude kite flights is aerodynamic line drag. The use of Dyneema over an extended period has shown that it is highly resistant to ultra violet degradation in comparison to Kevlar. Richard Crawford, a high altitude flyer from the US, made an attempt on the world single kite altitude record using a 220 lb test, Technora line manufactured by Twinline. He reported that he flew a delta kite to approximately 6,500 ft in September 2008.

== Specialized applications ==
When a kite application does not fit a common purpose, then specialized kite lines are used. Setting specific records under controlled conditions allows kite operators or competitors to choose kite lines with high specificity and without excessive safety factors.

The short kite line called the hang loop for the free-flying kite hang gliders has received special engineering attention; the further main kite-lines from the hang loop to the pilot's harness are also highly specialized in design.

When maximizing performance for large kites; E. D. Archibald was the first to use piano wire for kiting.

Flatland kiting hang gliders with 3000' of tow line holding the manned hang glider kite takes special care to specify. Protecting the kite line from ground abrasion is considered.

Want to fly an indoor kite without wind? The indoor no-wind kite operator need not worry about line breaks causing damages to downwind property. The choice of line can be very specialized here.

When the kite line is to be invisible, a clear translucent fine thread is chosen.

Making kite lines visible for night flying occurs in short-line and long line applications. Line lights is one solution sometimes used. Lines that carry light is another. Lights on the ground shining on stunt kites and their lines occurs. Flying Kites at Night

== Spider silk and "ballooning" (mechanical kiting) ==
Biologists began using the term "ballooning" for mechanical kiting used by spiderlings to disperse to new locations. Another spider silk for the bridge thread is frequently kited. And another thread of the spider is used as a drag line from which spiders frequently swing in the breeze, getting deflected before landing. Humans have used spider silk for making kites.

== Safety ==
Fit the kite line to the kite application; handle the line as needed to avoid hazards, accidents, and injury to persons and property. The operator of a kite system is fully responsible for damages done by the operation of his or her kite system; this includes the kite line. Pre-flight plan and pre-flight the kite line; avoid surprises. Piano wire is appropriate for certain applications, but totally inappropriate for recreational or sport kite flying. Fishing monofilament line is not used for most hobby, recreational, or sport power kiting because of its stretch, breaking behavior, and thinness; avoid it unless there is a very special application involved. Metal wire can conduct static and current electricity; avoid metal wires unless a professional scientific or industrial engineer approves the line for a specific purpose.

Gloves, proper reel choices, goggles, guards, tension limiters, and other safety devices help to reduce accidents. Ability to de-power a kite's lift and drag is a part of sound kite systems. Tensed line can act as razors. Moving lines can cut through flesh too easily. Fatalities too often occur from kite line abuse. Keep kite lines in good condition. Realize that knots weaken kite line. Keep kite lines dry and clean. Log any wear and use of the line; replace lines as needed. Choose a safety factor when designing a line for an application. Avoid flying in the rain or stormy weather changes.

== See also ==
- Paravane (water kite)
- Paravane (weapon)
- Manja or Manjha, Hindi word for the glass powder coated kite flying & fighting string from Indian subcontinent and surrounding regions
