= Outline of wind energy =

Overview of and topical guide to wind energy

The following outline is provided as an overview of and topical guide to wind energy:

Wind energy – the kinetic energy of air in motion, also called wind.

== Types ==
Wind energy can be described as all of the following:

- Wind Energy – Sun heats up uneven surface of earth, which causes motion of air. Hot air and cold air interchanges their places lead to flow of air. As it has force with motion, It carries kinetic energy. This is called wind energy
- Energy – an indirectly observed quantity, often understood as the ability a physical system has to do work on other physical systems.
  - Renewable energy – energy which comes from natural resources which are naturally replenished.
- Natural resource – materials and components (something that can be used) that can be found within the environment. Every man-made product is composed of natural resources (at its fundamental level). A natural resource may exist as a separate entity such as fresh water, and air, as well as a living organism such as a fish, or it may exist in an alternate form which must be processed to obtain the resource such as metal ores, oil, and most forms of energy.
  - Renewable resource – natural resource with the ability to reproduce through biological or natural processes and are replenished with the passage of time.

== Sources ==
- Atmosphere – a layer of gases that may surround a material body of sufficient mass, and that is held in place by the gravity of the body.
  - Wind – the flow of gases on a large scale. Wind is composed of:
    - Air – the gas found in the Earth's atmosphere. Air is mainly composed of nitrogen, oxygen, and argon, which together constitute the major gases of the atmosphere.
      - Gas – one of the three classical states of matter (the others being liquid and solid).
    - Motion – change in position of an object (including particles) with respect to time. Motion is typically described in terms of velocity, acceleration, displacement and time. Flow is a type of motion.

== History ==
- History of wind power – has been used as long as humans have put sails into the wind.
  - Maritime history – The Ancient Egyptians had knowledge to some extent of sail construction.
    - History of sails – The earliest known depictions of sails are from ancient Egypt around 3200 BCE, where reed boats sailed upstream against the River Nile's current.
      - Age of Sail – the period in which international trade and naval warfare were dominated by sailing ships, lasting from the 16th to the mid 19th

century.

== Wind power ==
Wind power – conversion of wind energy into a useful form of energy.

- Variable renewable energy – any source of renewable energy that is not continuously available due to some factor outside direct control. The variable source may be quite predictable, for example, tidal power, but cannot be dispatched to meet the demand of a power system.
- Environmental impact of wind power – relatively minor compared to the environmental impact of traditional energy sources. Wind power consumes no fuel, and emits no air pollution, unlike fossil fuel power sources.
- Wind power forecasting – estimating the expected production of wind farms.
- Wind resource assessment – the process by which wind power developers estimate the future energy production of a wind farm.

=== Types of wind power ===
- Wind turbine – a turbine that converts wind energy into mechanical energy.
- Windmill – a machine which converts the energy of wind into rotational energy by means of vanes called sails or blades.
  - Windpump – a windmill used for pumping water, either as a source of fresh water from wells, or for draining low-lying areas of land.
- Sail – any type of surface intended to move a vessel, vehicle or rotor by being placed in a wind – in essence a propulsion wing

=== Wind power industry ===
Wind power industry – industry involved with the design, manufacture, construction, and maintenance of wind turbines. The modern wind power industry began in 1979 with the serial production of wind turbines by Danish manufacturers. The industry is currently undergoing a period of rapid globalization and consolidation.

- List of wind power consulting companies
- List of wind turbine manufacturers (shows the top 10 companies and an alphabetical listing)
- Wind energy software – application software programs to assist in the development and operation of wind farms.
- Wind farm management – overseeing the operation, maintenance, and administration of wind farms.

==== Wind farms ====
Wind farm – group of wind turbines in the same location used to produce electric power. A large wind farm may consist of several hundred individual wind turbines, and cover an extended area of hundreds of square miles, but the land between the turbines may be used for agricultural or other purposes. A wind farm may also be located offshore.

- Community wind energy – projects are locally owned by farmers, investors, businesses, schools, utilities, or other public or private entities who utilize wind energy to support and reduce energy costs to the local community.
- List of offshore wind farms (currently operational wind farms, rated by nameplate capacity)
- List of onshore wind farms (currently operational, rated by generating capacity)
- Offshore wind power – the construction of wind farms in bodies of water to generate electricity from wind.

===== Wind turbines =====
Wind turbine – a turbine that converts wind energy into mechanical energy.

- Wind turbine aerodynamics – the power, F, is the force vector, and U is the speed of the moving wind turbine part.
- Wind turbine design – the process of defining the form and specifications of a wind turbine to extract energy from the wind.
- Types of wind turbines
  - Airborne wind turbine – a design concept for a wind turbine that is supported in the air without a tower.
  - Floating wind turbine – an offshore wind turbine mounted on a floating structure that allows the turbine to generate electricity in water depths where bottom-mounted towers are not feasible.
  - Small wind turbine – are wind turbines which have lower energy output than large commercial wind turbines.
  - Unconventional wind turbines – the three-bladed horizontal-axis wind turbine (HAWT).
  - Vertical axis wind turbine – type of wind turbine where the main rotor shaft is set vertically and the main components are located at the base of the turbine.
    - Darrieus wind turbine – a type of vertical axis wind turbine (VAWT) used to generate electricity from the energy carried in the wind.
    - Savonius wind turbine – are a type of vertical-axis wind turbine (VAWT), used for converting the force of the wind into torque on a rotating shaft.
    - Quietrevolution wind turbine – a brand of (VAWT) vertical axis helical turbine.

==== Wind power by region ====
- Wind power in Africa
  - Wind power in Morocco – amounts to an installed production capacity of 275 MW and 800 MW under construction.
- Wind power in Asia – Asia has a total generating capacity of 10,600 MW.
  - Wind power in India – began in the 1990s, and has significantly increased in the last few years.
  - Wind power in Iran – has been experiencing a growth in wind generation in recent years, and has a plan to substantially increase wind generation each year.
  - Wind power in the People's Republic of China – by the end of 2011, it had grown to 62 gigawatts (GW) of electricity generating capacity, and China has identified wind power as a key growth component of its economy.
  - Wind power in Pakistan – new to wind power, Pakistan is building wind power plants in Jhimpir, Gharo, Keti Bandar and Bin Qasim in Sindh.
  - Wind power in Thailand – began in 2011, 223 MW current capacity – target of 1,200 MW by 2021
- Wind power in Europe – totalled 93,957 MW – enough to supply 6.
  - Wind power in Austria – has an estimated 6,600 to 10,000 gigawatt-hour (GWh) of exploitable wind energy potential. As of 2008, Austria had an installed capacity of 995 MW.
  - Wind power in Belgium – depends partially on regional governments (Brussels-Capital Region, Flemish Region, Walloon Region) and partially on the Belgian federal government.
  - Wind power in Croatia – has been growing since the first wind farm was installed in the country in 2004.
  - Wind power in Denmark – Melbourne University Press, ISBN 0-522-85251-3
  - Wind power in Estonia – amounts to an installed capacity of 184 MW, whilst roughly 546 MW worth of projects are currently being developed.
  - Wind power in Finland – describes wind power in Finland as part of energy in Finland and renewable energy in Finland.
  - Wind power in France
  - Wind power in Germany
  - Wind power in Greece
  - Wind power in Hungary – was 329 MW as of April 2011.
  - Wind power in Italy – the world's sixth largest producer of wind power, with an installed nameplate capacity of 5,814 MW (in 2010).
  - Wind power in Malta
  - Wind power in Poland
  - Wind power in Portugal
  - Wind power in Romania
  - Wind power in Russia – Russia has a long history of small-scale wind power use, but the country has not yet developed large-scale commercial wind energy production.
  - Wind power in Scotland – wind power is Scotland's fastest growing renewable energy technology, with 2,574 MW of installed capacity as of April 2011.
  - Wind power in Serbia
  - Wind power in Spain
  - Wind power in Sweden
  - Wind power in the Netherlands
  - Wind power in the Republic of Ireland
  - Wind power in the United Kingdom – is about 6,580 MW, generated by 333 operational wind farms with 3,506 wind turbines.
  - Wind power in Turkey
- Wind power in North America
  - Wind power in Canada
  - Wind power in the United States – has expanded quickly over the last several years.
    - Wind power in Arizona – began in 2009 with the commissioning of the first phase of the Dry Lake Wind Power Project in Navajo County, Arizona|Navajo County.
    - Wind power in California – has doubled in capacity since 2002.
    - Wind power in Colorado – has been growing significantly in recent years due to international mass adoption of wind power and the state's aggressive renewable portfolio standard that requires 30% of the state's electricity to come from renewable sources by 2020.
    - Wind power in Illinois – has been supported by a renewable portfolio standard, passed in 2007, and strengthened in 2009, which requires 10% renewable energy from electric companies by 2010 and 25% by 2025.
    - Wind power in Indiana – was limited to a few small water-pumping windmills on farms until 2008 with construction of Indiana's first utility-scale wind power facility, Goodland (phase I) with a nameplate capacity of 130 MW.
    - Wind power in Iowa – has nearly 4,400 MW of capacity, second only to Texas.
    - Wind power in Japan – generates a small but increasing proportion of the country's electricity, as the installed capacity has been growing in recent years.
    - Wind power in Kansas
    - Wind power in Maine – has 521 MW capacity.
    - Wind power in Massachusetts – has vast wind energy resources onshore as well as offshore and the installed capacity has been growing in recent years due to a variety of regulatory actions and financial incentives enacted by the state government.
    - Wind power in Minnesota
    - Wind power in Montana
    - Wind power in New Hampshire
    - Wind power in New Jersey – in the early stages of development.
    - Wind power in New York – includes facilities at Maple Ridge Wind Farm, the largest wind farm in the state of New York, with 195 Vestas model V82 1.
    - Wind power in North Dakota – 1,445 MW of installed capacity.
    - Wind power in Ohio – has a long history, and as of 2011, Ohio has eleven utility-scale wind power installations installed or under construction, with a combined nameplate capacity of just over 1051 MW.
    - Wind power in Oregon
    - Wind power in Pennsylvania – several future wind farms planned or under construction.
    - Wind power in Texas – consists of many wind farms with a total installed nameplate capacity of 10,377 MW from over 40 different projects.
    - Wind power in Vermont – consists of 46 megawatts (MW) of operational wind farms, 63 MW under construction, and various proposed projects.
    - Wind power in Washington
    - Wind power in Wyoming – in November 2008, The New York Times reported a land rush in Wyoming in anticipation of future wind power development projects.
- Wind power in Oceania
  - Wind power in Australia
    - Wind power in New South Wales
    - List of wind farms in Queensland
    - Wind power in South Australia
    - List of wind farms in Tasmania
    - List of wind farms in Victoria
    - List of wind farms in Western Australia
  - Wind power in New Zealand – generates a small but rapidly growing proportion of the country's electricity, as the country makes increasing use of its outstanding wind resources.

=== Wind-powered vehicles ===
Wind-powered vehicle – typically uses a sail to harness the wind to propel it. Also includes kite-driven vehicles. The predominant type of wind-powered vehicles are seafaring vessels (sailboats and yachts).

- Wind-powered vehicles by type
  - Wind-powered ships
    - Sailing ship – a ship with a hull, rigging, and at least one mast to hold up the sails that use the wind to power the ship. The crew who sail a ship are called sailors or hands.
    - Rotor ship – ship designed to use the Magnus effect for propulsion. To take advantage of this effect, it uses turbosails which are powered by an engine.
      - Alcyone – ship operated by the Cousteau Society. It was created as an expedition ship and to test the operation of a new kind of marine propulsion system, the turbosail.
      - E-Ship 1 – a RoLo cargo ship that made its first voyage with cargo in August 2010. The ship is owned by the third-largest wind turbine manufacturer, Germany's Enercon GmbH.
    - Windmill ship – wind energy conversion system ship or wind energy harvester ship propels itself by use of a windmill to drive a propeller.
  - Wind-powered land vehicles
    - Formula AE – a solar and wind powered car. Initial startup is by solar power; as the car travels at faster speeds, strategically placed air intakes are designed to direct air flow to power the wind turbines.
    - Greenbird – a wind-powered vehicle that broke the land speed record for the fastest wind-powered vehicle at the dry Ivanpah Lake on March 26, 2009.
    - Racing Aeolus – racing event, for which the student participants were required to design and build a wind-powered vehicle that could drive against the wind, powered by a wind turbine.
- Wind-powered vehicle propulsion systems
  - Sail – any type of surface intended to move a vessel, vehicle or rotor by being placed in a wind—in essence a propulsion wing. Sails are used in sailing.
    - Turbosail – naval propulsion system based on an application of the Magnus effect. First attempted by Anton Flettner on the Buckau, it was later developed by Jacques-Yves Cousteau who commissioned the Alcyone.
    - Wingsail – a form of marine propulsion similar to conventional sails.

== Wind energy organizations ==
- Airborne Wind Energy Industry Association (AWEIA) – founded in 2009 to serve globally companies and institutions dedicated to converting wind energy for useful loads (airborne wind energy technology) by use of tethered and free-flight aircraft (airborne wind energy AWE); the tethered and free-flight mode is in contrast to using non-tethered ground-connected wind turbines.
- American Wind Energy Association (AWEA)
- BlueEnergy – a non-profit organization building sustainable energy and water systems on the Caribbean coast of Nicaragua.
- Citizen Partnerships for Offshore Wind – a collaboration of communities and organizations that believe the United States must move towards indigenous clean energy sources like offshore wind and that public education and citizen engagement are essential to making that transition.
- WindEurope, formerly the European Wind Energy Association (EWEA) – an association based in Brussels, promoting the use of wind power in Europe.
- Global Wind Energy Council – provides representation for the global wind energy industry
- Makani Power – an Alameda, California-based company that develops airborne wind turbines.
- World Wind Energy Association (WWEA) – an international non-profit association representing the wind power sector worldwide, with members in 100 countries, amongst them the leading national and regional wind energy associations.

== Publications ==
- Directory Indian Wind Power

== Influential persons ==
- Dale Vince – owner of Ecotricity
- Albert Betz – German physicist and a pioneer of wind turbine technology
- William Cubitt – invented patent sails
- James Dehlsen – created Zond (wind power developer) in 1980.
- Estakhri – created the earliest known account of windmills (10th century)
- Poul la Cour (1846–1908) – Danish scientist, inventor and educationalist. Today, la Cour is especially recognized for his early work on wind power, both experimental work on aerodynamics and practical implementation of wind power plants.

== See also ==
- Outline of energy
  - Outline of energy development – Energy development is the effort to provide sufficient primary energy sources and secondary energy forms for supply, cost, impact on air pollution and water pollution, mitigation of climate change with renewable energy.
- Betz's law – that may be derived by means of an infinitely thin rotor from a fluid flowing at a certain speed.
- Capacity factor – of a power plant is the ratio of the actual output of a power plant over a period of time and its potential output if it had operated at full nameplate capacity the entire time.
- EROEI
- Grid energy storage – (also called large-scale energy storage) refers to the methods used to store electricity on a large scale within an electrical power grid.
- High-voltage direct current – electric power transmission system uses direct current for the bulk transmission of electrical power, in contrast with the more common alternating current systems.
- Net energy gain (NEG) – is a concept used in energy economics that refers to the difference between the energy expended to harvest an energy source and the amount of energy gained from that harvest.
- Energy storage – accomplished by devices or physical media that store energy to perform useful operation at a later time.
- Energy subsidies – are measures that keep prices for consumers below market levels or for producers above market levels, or reduce costs for consumers and producers.
- Wind profile power law – a relationship between the wind speeds at one height, and those at another.
- Kitegen
- Design feasibilIty of Wind turbine systems
- Offshore wind port
- Wind turbine installation vessel
