= List of airborne wind energy organizations =

This is a list of airborne wind energy or kite-energy organizations that are advancing airborne wind energy systems (AWES). In 2011 there were over 40 organizations involved worldwide, but this number has increased to over 60 in 2017.

Categories of kite-energy or airborne-wind-energy organizations that are forming the nascent industry: education, academic, non-profit, for-profit, communication, research, original kite-energy equipment manufacturer, kite-line manufacturer, industry-wide association, history, testing, forum entity, library, cooperative, consortium, group, club, school, training school.

Generation by kite-energy systems may involve pumping, electricity generators flown in the upper flying system (flygen), electric generators situated on the land or sea or on board a vessel (groundgen), simple lifting of objects (lifting), pulling hulls or other objects (traction), or transportation; systems generate energy to do special tasks. Systems may be scaled from tiny to utility size.

== Organizations ==
Organizations
Name	Location	Start year	Type	Generation	Comment	Ref
Kitemill	Voss, Norway	2008	Company	Groundgen	Reel in/Reel out. Bought KPS in 2020	
WindFisher	Near Grenoble, France	2015	Company	Groundgen	Magnus effect energy balloon	
KiteX	Copenhagen, Denmark	2020	Company	Flygen	Technical University of Denmark spin-off	
Kitekraft	Munich, Germany	2019	Company	Flygen	Technical University of Munich renewable energy spin-off	
Airborne Wind Europe	Brussels, Belgium	2018	Association	All types of AWES		
Skypull SA	Lugano, Switzerland	2017	Company	Groundgen	developed a specifically suitable UAV	
Scuola Sant'Anna	Pisa, Italy	2013	Research Lab	Flygen	Investigates Dual Drone Systems	
Airborne Wind Energy Labs	Texas, USA	2013	Research Lab	Groundgen	Provides calculations of cost per kWh	
Altaeros Energies	Massachusetts, USA	2010	Research and OEM	Flygen	MIT and Harvard graduates	
AWEIA	Worldwide	2009	Association	All types	Nation chapters	
NTS GmbH	Germany	2006	Company	Groundgen	X-Wind technology by Uwe Ahrens	
TU Delft Wind Energy Institute	Delft, The Netherlands	1999	Research group	Groundgen	Wubbo Ockels ✝, Roland Schmehl	
GIPSA-lab	Grenoble, France	2011	Research group	Groundgen	Ahmad Hably	
Enerkite	Brandenburg, Germany	2009	Company	Groundgen	Bernhard Kämpf	
Energy Kite Systems	Los Angeles, California, USA	1968	Research, communication	All types of AWES	Acquired by Upper Windpower	
University of Freiburg	Germany	2011	Research group	Groundgen	Moritz Diehl. The SYSCOP Kite Power activities are within the ERC Project HIGHWIND.	
SkySails	Hamburg, Germany	2001	Company	Groundgen and hull traction	Stephan Wrage, Thomas Meyer	
Makani Power	Alameda, California, USA	2006	Company	Flygen	Acquired by Google	
KiteLab Group	Ilwaco, Washington, USA	?	R&D	All methods	Rapid open source development of kite energy. Flight encampments. kPower.	
Kitepower Enevate BV	Delft, NL	2016	Company	Groundgen	Johannes Peschel, mobile 100 kW system, H2020 FTI	
Ampyx Power	The Hague, The Netherlands	2008	Company	GroundGen	European fund for regional development	
e-kite	The Netherlands	2013	Company	GroundGen	50 kW prototype	
KiteGen	Torino, Italy	2003	Private Research- industrial Company	GroundGen; Carousel GW scale	3-MW preseries; 130sqm composite wings, first mover; full patents coverage (3000 worldwide); freedom to operate;	
TwingTec	Switzerland	2013	Company	GroundGen	Using tensairity	
UpWind Project	Portugal	2014	Research Group	GroundGen	The University of Porto Airborne Wind Energy Project. Investigates multi-kite systems	
Windswept and Interesting Limited	United Kingdom	2012	Company	GroundGen with tensile rotary power transmission from airborne kite turbine	Using Kite Turbine and Tensile Rotary Power Transmission	
UFSCkite	Florianópolis, Brazil	2012	Research Lab	GroundGen	First AWE research group in Latin America	
Kites for Future	Berlin, Germany	2020	free-time	GroundGen	Open source	
Windlift	Durham, NC, USA	2006	Company	GroundGen	Rob Creighton, Andy Stough, Mark Aull	
