= Gipe =

Gipe is a surname. Notable people with the surname include:

- George Gipe (1933–1986), American writer
- Jasmina Perazić-Gipe (born 1960), Serbian-American basketball coach
- Lawrence Gipe (born 1962), American painter
- Paul Gipe, renewable energy commentator
- Yukki Gipe (musician) member of the post-punk band Bullet LaVolta

== See also ==
- Gyp (disambiguation)
