= Paul Gipe =

American environmentalist and author

Paul Gipe (born 1950) is an American renewable energy advocate, author, and expert in wind power technology and policy. He is known for his contributions to developing community-based renewable energy systems.

In 1998, the World Renewable Energy Congress awarded him for his work in Renewable Energy. Additionally, in 1988, the American Wind Energy Association named him Person of the Year in the industry.

He has written about wind and solar energy, feed-in tariffs, and electric vehicles. He is also an analyst for World Future Council.

He contributed to the seven-year struggle for passage of the National Surface Mining Act, which regulates coal strip mining in the United States. He co-authored Surface Mining, Energy, and the Environment.

== Biography ==
He was born in 1950 in Alexandria, Indiana. He holds an interdisciplinary degree in Natural Resources from Ball State University in Muncie, Indiana.

While a student, Gipe played a role in environmental advocacy, contributing to a campaign that petitioned the Indiana Legislature to ban the sale of phosphate detergents.

In recognition of his professional achievements, Gipe was awarded as a Distinguished Alumnus by Ball State University's Natural Resources and Environmental Management Department in 2019, coinciding with the department's 50th anniversary.

=== Career ===
His career in renewable energy spans over four decades. He began working with wind energy in the late 1970s and early 1980s. He played a role in the seven-year effort to pass the National Surface Mining Act, which regulates coal strip mining in the United States. As part of this initiative, Gipe co-authored Surface Mining, Energy, and the Environment and was invited to the White House by President Jimmy Carter for the signing of the Surface Mining Control and Reclamation Act of 1977.

He played a role in adapting feed-in tariff policies—mechanisms that incentivize renewable energy generation—to the North American market. He started campaigns bringing feed-in tariffs to the political forefront in Canada and the United States. In 2004, he served as acting executive director of the Ontario Sustainable Energy Association, where he led a campaign for Advanced Renewable Tariffs, ultimately leading to Ontario's Green Energy Act in 2009.

From 1986 to 1994, Gipe represented the American Wind Energy Association (AWEA) on the West Coast and served on its board of directors from 1996 to 1998.

He also led the Kern Wind Energy Association, a California-based trade group, during the late 1980s and early 1990s. In the late 1990s, Gipe conducted noise and performance testing of small wind turbines, contributing to the establishment of standardized testing and certification practices for the industry. Gipe has represented the Pennsylvania Chapter of the Sierra Club in legislative discussions at the state level and previously served on the Sierra Club's technical advisory team on energy. In 2005, the Kern-Kaweah chapter of the Sierra Club presented him with the Sierra Club Cup, the chapter's most prestigious award.

Gipe has authored books on wind energy, including Wind Energy Basics: A Guide to Home and Community Scale Wind-Energy Systems and Wind Power: Renewable Energy for Home, Farm, and Business, which have been translated into several languages.

== Selected bibliography ==
=== Books ===
- Gipe, Paul (2016). Wind energy for the rest of us: a comprehensive guide to wind power and how to use it: introducing electricity rebels and how they are changing the face of wind energy (First printing ed.). Bakersfield, CA: wind-works.org. ISBN 978-0-9974518-1-8.
- Pasqualetti, Martin J.; Gipe, Paul; Righter, Robert W. (2002). Wind power in view: energy landscapes in a crowded world. Sustainable world series. San Diego: Academic Press. ISBN 978-0-12-546334-8.
- Gipe, Paul (2004). Wind Power, Revised Edition: Renewable Energy for Home, Farm, and Business. Chelsea Green Publishing. p. 512. ISBN 978-1931498142.
- Gipe, Paul (1999). Wind energy basics: a guide to small and micro wind systems. Real Goods solar living book. White River Junction, VT: Chelsea Green Pub. Co. ISBN 978-1-890132-07-1.
- Gipe, Paul (1995). Wind energy comes of age. Wiley series in sustainable design. New York: Wiley. ISBN 978-0-471-10924-2.
- Gipe, Paul (1993). Wind power for home & business: renewable energy for the 1990s and beyond. A real goods independent living book. Post Mills, VT: Chelsea Green Pub. Co. ISBN 978-0-930031-64-0.

=== Journals ===
- Möllerström, Erik; Gipe, Paul; Beurskens, Jos; Ottermo, Fredric (1 May 2019). "A historical review of vertical axis wind turbines rated 100 kW and above". Renewable and Sustainable Energy Reviews. 105: 1–13. doi:10.1016/j.rser.2018.12.022. ISSN 1364-0321.
- Gipe, Paul (1993). "The Wind Industry's Experience with Aesthetic Criticism". Leonardo. 26 (3): 243–248. ISSN 1530-9282.
- Gipe, Paul; Möllerström, Erik (1 February 2023). "An overview of the history of wind turbine development: Part II–The 1970s onward". Wind Engineering. 47 (1): 220–248. doi:10.1177/0309524X221122594. ISSN 0309-524X.
- Gipe, Paul; Möllerström, Erik (1 December 2022). "An overview of the history of wind turbine development: Part I—The early wind turbines until the 1960s". Wind Engineering. 46 (6): 1973–2004. doi:10.1177/0309524X221117825. ISSN 0309-524X.
