= Crosswind kite power =

Form of wind-powered mechanical or electrical generation

Crosswind kite power is power derived from airborne wind-energy conversion systems (AWECS, also AWES) or crosswind kite power systems (CWKPS). The kite system is characterized by energy-harvesting parts flying transversely to the direction of the ambient wind, i.e., to crosswind mode; sometimes the entire wing set and tether set are flown in crosswind mode. From toy to power-grid-feeding sizes, these systems may be used as high-altitude wind power (HAWP) devices or low-altitude wind power (LAWP) devices without having to use towers. Flexible wings or rigid wings may be used in the kite system. A tethered wing, flying in crosswind at many times wind speed, harvests wind power from an area that exceeds the wing's total area by many times.

Crosswind kite power systems have some advantages over conventional wind turbines, including access to more powerful and stable wind resources, a high capacity factor, capability for deployment on and offshore at comparable costs, and no need for a tower. Additionally, the wings of the CWKPS may vary in aerodynamic efficiency; the movement of crosswinding tethered wings is sometimes compared with the outer parts of conventional wind turbine blades. However, a conventional traverse-to-wind rotating blade set carried aloft in a kite-power system has the blade set cutting to crosswind and is a form of crosswind kite power.

Miles L. Loyd furthered studies on crosswind kite power systems in his 1980 work "Crosswind Kite Power". There are crosswind advocates who believe that crosswind kite power was introduced by P. Payne and C. McCutchen in their patent No. 3,987,987, filed in 1975; however, crosswind kite power was used far before such a patent, e.g., in target kites for war-target practice, where the cross winding power permitted high speeds to give practice to gunners.

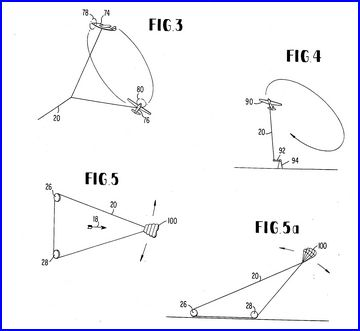
US3987987figs

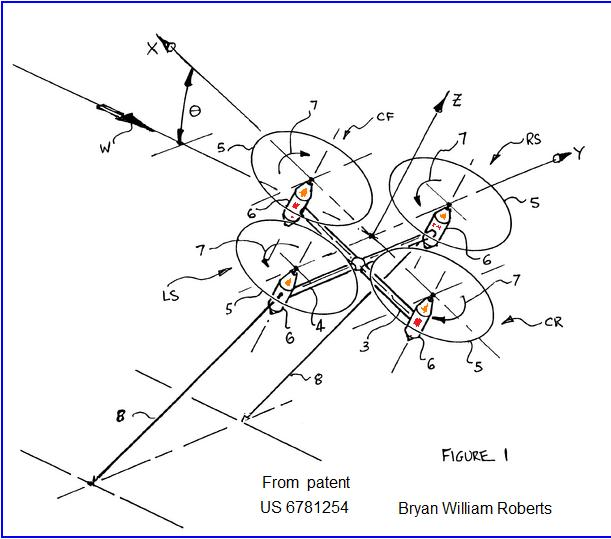
This illustrates where parts of the wing set of a crosswind kite power device is cross winding during conversion of the wind's kinetic energy.

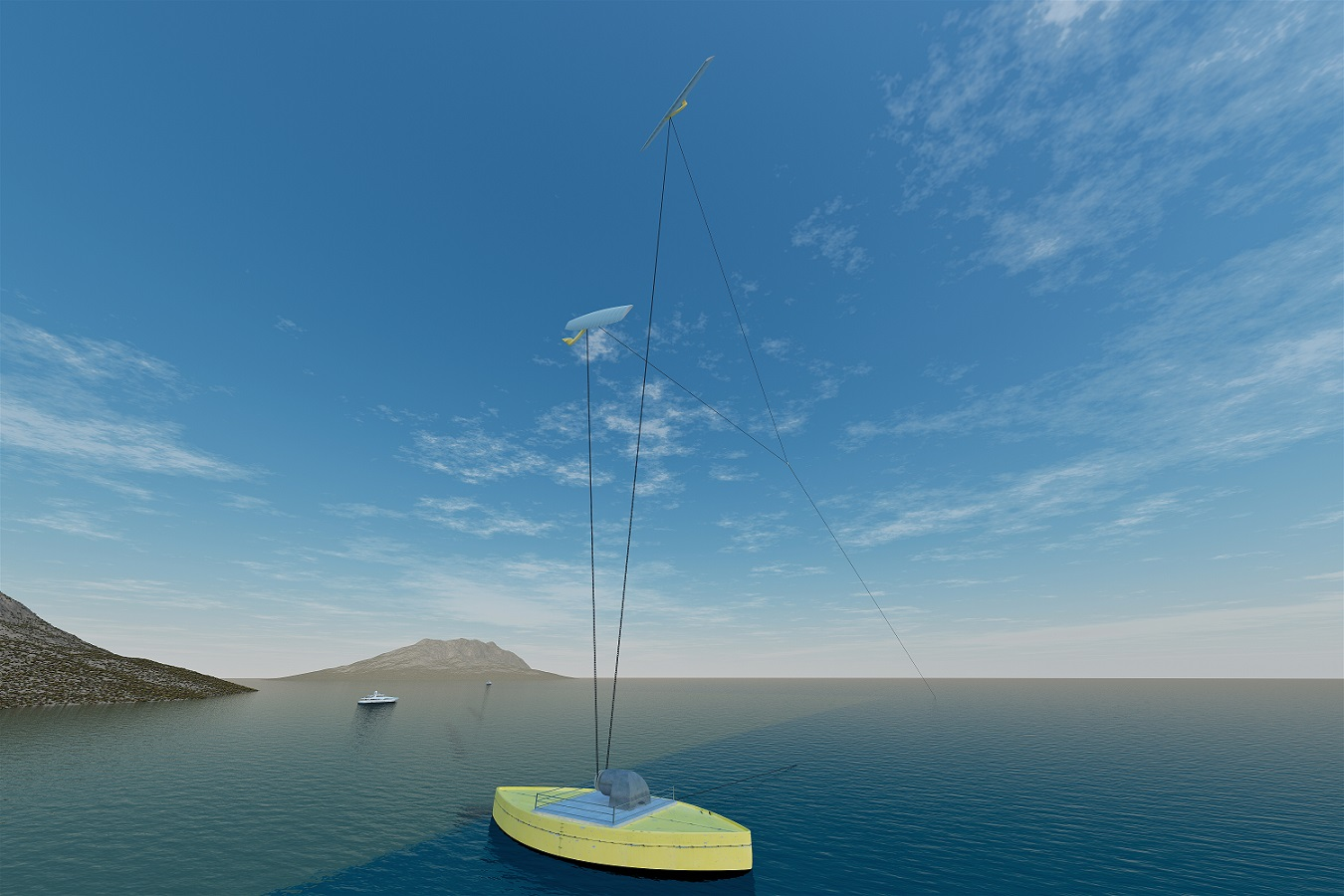
Crosswind kite power station with separate motion transfer with two wings offshore, artist's impression

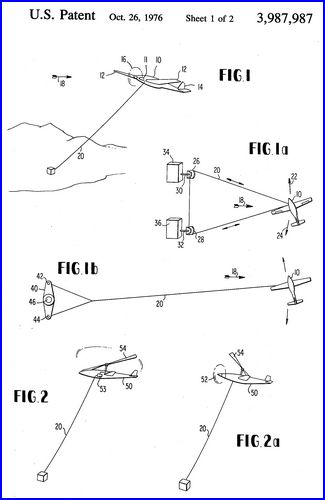
Drawing from patent US 3,987,987

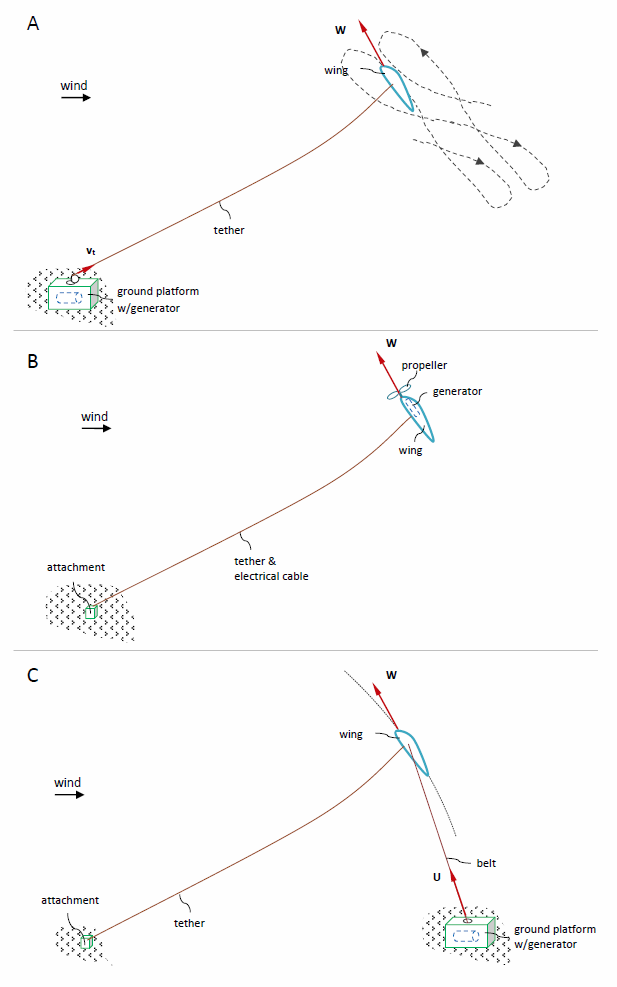
Scheme of some types of airborne crosswind power systems

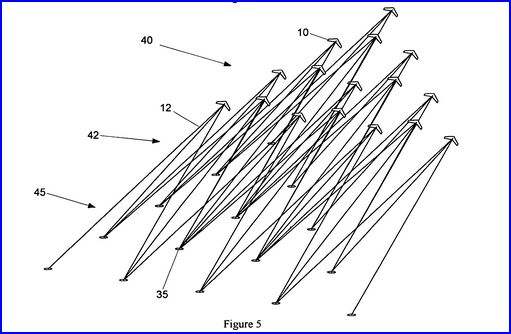
BenjaminTignerFig5US8066225 Farming crosswind kite power devices is illustrated by Benjamin Tigner.

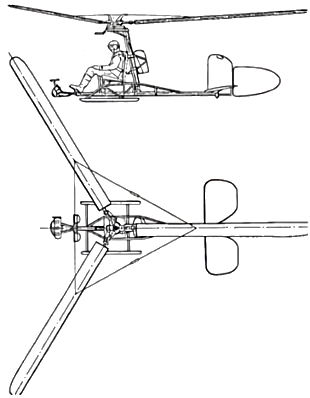
Lifter of human by use of fast-motion autorotating bladed crosswind kite power system, a gyro kite type

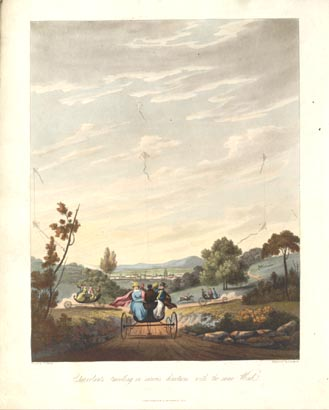
As George Pocock controlled his kite system wings to left or right, he would gain power because of the crosswind kite power energy-gain effect.

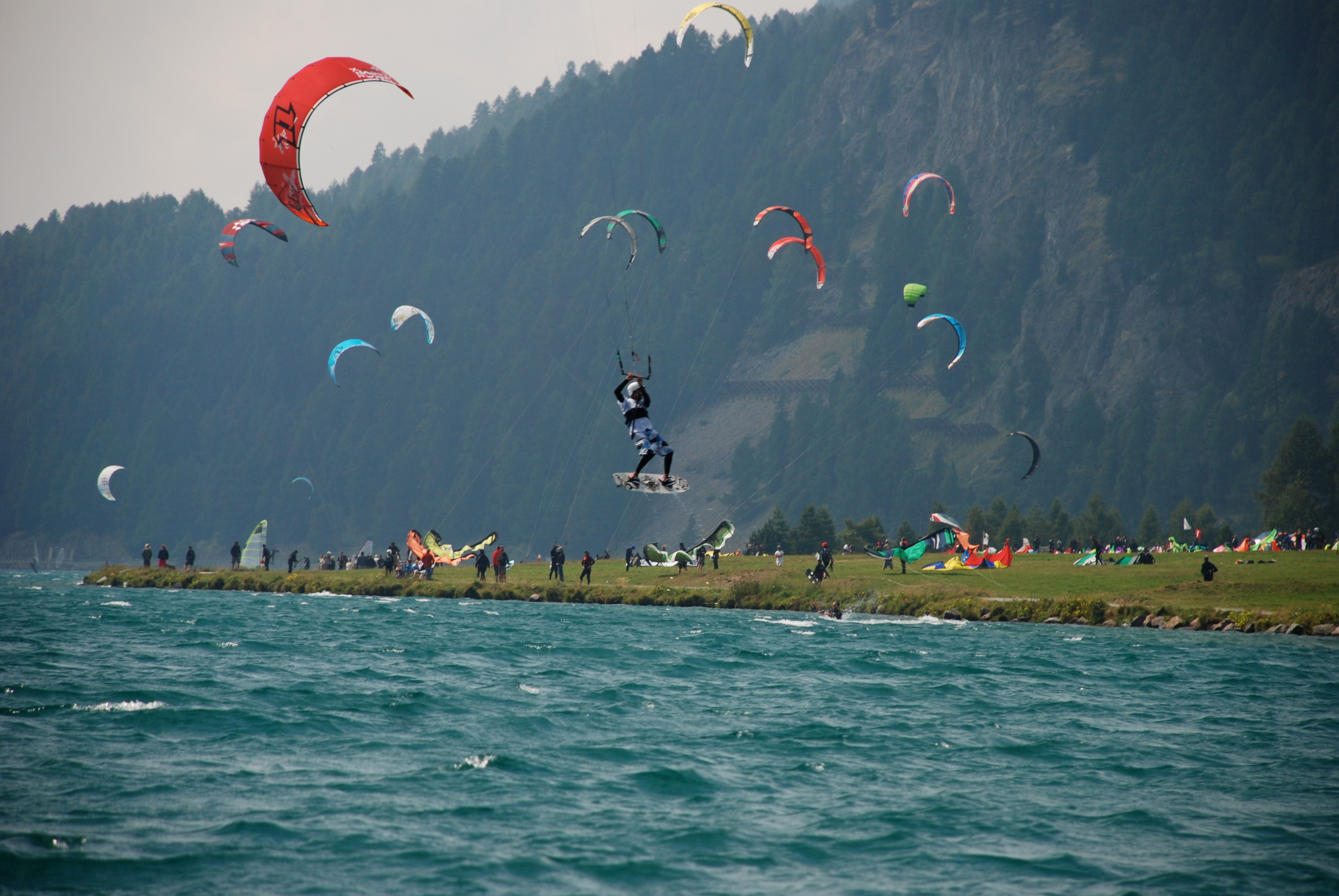
Kite-Wahnsinn am Silvaplana See. The crosswind kite power systems shown has a purpose to move the athlete fast downwind, upwind, and sometimes into the air to significant altitudes and distances. The wind is slightly slowed by such activity, as the CWKPS harvests energy from the wind. Kiteboarding.

== Types of crosswind kite power systems (CWKPS) ==
How a system extracts energy from the wind and transfers energy to useful purposes helps to define types of crosswind kite power systems. One type of parameter regards the position of the generator or pump or tasking line or device. Another type of parameter regards how the tethers of the tether set of the kite system are utilized; the tethers holding the kiting wing elements aloft may be used in various ways to form types; tethers may simply hold working wings aloft, or they may be pulling loads on the ground, or multitasking by sending aloft-gained electricity to ground receivers or by pulling loads or by being the tasking device itself as when used for pulling people or things or cutting or grinding things. Some types are distinguished by fast motion transfer or slow motion transfer. Typing of crosswind kite power system also occurs by the nature of the wing set where count of wings and types of wings matter to designers and users; a wing set might be in a train arrangement, stack configuration, arch complex, dome mesh, coordinating family of wings, or just be a simple single-wing with single tether. Types of crosswind kite power devices are also distinguished by scale, purpose, intended life, and cost level. Typing by economic success occurs; is the system effective in the energy or task market or not? Some CWKPS are a type called lifters; they are purposed just for lifting loads, perhaps humans; the type is frequented by the use of auto rotating blades that appear then to look like helicopters. A single crosswind kite power system (CWKPS) may be a hybrid complex performing aloft energy generation while also performing ground-based work through tether pulling of loads. The crosswind kite power systems that involve fluttering elements are being explored in several research centres; flutter is mined for energy conversion in a few ways. Researchers are showing types of CWKPS that are difficult to classify or type.

=== Tether pulling of people or goods on boards, in hulls, with skis, etc. ===
In the systems of this type of CWKPS, the pulling tether set drives the resisting people and objects to various points on the surface of water bodies or land or points in the atmosphere. In this type of crosswind kite power operation, the design of the resistive objects (people, boards, hulls, boats, ships, water turbines, air turbines, other wings) makes for further types. Cross winding of the upper flying wings provide power to achieve certain final objectives. The objectives are found in such as kiteboarding, kite windsurfing, snow kiting, yacht kiting, freighter-ship sailing, kite boating, and free-flight soaring and jumping. A collection of researchers have explored the historic free-flight parakite realm to where crosswind flying of the systems' wings would enable free-flight in the atmosphere; fundamentally this is a kite-string set with a wing above and a wing as the resistive anchor set; control of the separate wing set, especially in cross winding efforts mine the power of winds in different layers of the atmosphere.

=== Tether pulling to drive generator or pump shafts ===
In the systems of this type, an electrical generator, pump, or tasking line is installed on the ground. There are two subtypes, with or without a secondary vehicle. In the subtype without a secondary vehicle, the "Yo-Yo" method, the tether slowly unwinds off a drum on the ground, due to the windward pull of the kite system's wing, while the wing travels crosswind, that is, left-right of the wind's ambient direction, along various paths, e.g., a figure-8 flight path, optimized lemniscate paths, or circular paths (small or large radius). The turning drum rotates the rotor of the generator or pump through, perhaps, a high-ratio gearbox. Periodically, the wing is powered, and the tether is reeled in, or, using the crosswind for a constant pull, the tether is re-connected to a different section of the drum while the wing is traveling in a "downwind" cycle. In some systems two tethers are used instead of one.

In another subtype, a secondary vehicle is used. Such a vehicle can be a carousel, a car, railed cart, wheeled land vehicle, or even a ship on the water. The electrical generator is installed on the vehicle. The rotor of the electrical generator is brought in motion by the carousel, the axle of the car, or the screw of the ship, correspondingly.

=== Onboard generator ===
In the systems of this type, one or more flying blades and electrical generators are installed on the wing. The relative airflow rotates the blades by way of autorotation, an interaction with the wind, which transfer the power to the generators. Produced electrical energy is transmitted to the ground through an electrical cable laid along the tether or integrated with the tether. The same blades are sometimes used for double purpose where they are propellers positively driven by costed electricity for launching or special landing or calm-air flight-maintaining purpose.

=== Fast motion transfer with downwind ground receivers ===
In this type, an electrical generator is installed on the ground and a separate cable or belt, trailing behind the wing, transfers the power to a sprocket on the ground, which rotates the rotor of the generator. The separate belt extends at approximately the speed of the wing. Because of the high speed of that belt, the gearbox is not required.

=== Motion transfer with upwind ground receivers ===
In this type an electrical generator, pump, tasking line set, or lever is installed on the ground upwind of the wing and driven by the operation of two or three or more tethers arranged from a fast-moving cross winding flying wing set. Examples are found in the research centres of several universities and kite-energy research centres.

==== Lighter-than-air (LTA) assisted twin-coordinating wing sets ====
Several research centres are exploring twin wing sets employing tether pulling of upwind ground-based loads where the cross winding wing sets use lighter-than-air devices to assure flight in case of lulls in the ambient wind.

==== LTA-kite-balloon-lofted fast-moving autorotating bladed turbine with upwind receiver of electricity ====
Many in-public-domain patent disclosed teachings and some current research centres are with a focus on using LTA kites to hold bladed turbines using autorotation to drive flown generators.

=== Flutter-based crosswind kite power systems, fast-motion method ===
When a wing element in a kite system is designed to have flutter occur, that fluttering may be harvested for energy to power various loads. In flutter, the wing element travels to crosswind and then reverses to travel to crosswind in a generally opposite direction; the frequency of cycles of reversed direction is high. Flutter in traditional aviation is usually considered a bad and destructive dynamic to be designed out of an aircraft; but in CWKPS, flutter is sometimes designed into the kite system for the specific purpose of converting the wind's kinetic energy to useful purposes; the fast motion of flutter is prized by some kite-energy systems development centres.

Harvesting the energy of flutter in kite systems has been done in several ways. One way is to convert the flutter energy into sound, even pleasant sound or music; purposes vary from entertaining one person or a crowd of persons; bird-scaring has been an application. Jerking tether lines by the kite-flown fluttering elements to drive loads to make electricity has been done and is being explored. Pumping fluids by use of flutter-derived energy has been proposed in the kite-energy community. And having the fluttering wing made with appropriate materials and arrangement to be a direct electric-generator part, then electricity can be generated immediately; part of the fluttering wing that is formed to be a magnet flutters by conductive coils forms the parts of the electric generator.

=== Traction by use of CWKPS ===
CWKPS are used to move objects immediately over ice, snow, land, ponds, lakes, or oceans. The movement of objects may be done for various reasons: recreation, sport, commerce, industry, science, travel, mine-clearing, defence, offense, plowing, landscaping, etc. The multitude of kite systems flown to crosswind to move kite boarders, land sailors, kite surfers, kite boaters, yachts, ships, catamarans, kayaks, power kiters, kite buggies, kite skiers, kite water skiers, etc., is keeping kite-wing manufacturers busy. Sky Sails is a leader in saving fuel in the shipping industry by using CWKPS.

=== Lifters using CWKPS ===
In this type of CWKPS the fast-motion of the flying blades or wings harvest the wind's energy to power the lifting capacity of the system. Mass loads are sometimes close-coupled with the wing set; at other times the mass lifted is distributed along the tether set. A military use of this type involved rotor kites tethered by the kite line; a human observer gets lifted to high points for observation purposes. Some of these were used in conjunction with submarine operations with the submarine's towing motion providing the apparent wind for the CWKPS. One example is the Focke-Achgelis Fa 330. Lift-and-place or lift-and-drop uses occur in this type; mass loads are lifted and then placed or dropped; this is done sometimes to overcome barriers or to save ground-transportation fuel costs. When the mass that is lifted is a generator coupled with the crosswinding blades, then the AWES type is changed; this change is the foundation for the focus of some current wind power companies.

=== Torque transfer via rotary tether sets CWKPS ===
In this type, a set of kites is grouped to form a rotor, the rotary cross wind kites drive their set of tethers around a shared axis. Rings are set inside the rotary tethers to assist in holding the tethers apart. The tensile lines then transfer torque from the rotating kites to a ground based generator. On 15 December 2015 this method was the first to successfully complete the someawe.org 100*3 challenge For a prototype demonstration see

== Theory ==
In all types of the crosswind kite power system, the useful power can be approximately described by the Loyd's formula:

$$P = {2 \over 27} \rho_a A C_L({C_L \over C_D})^2 V^3$$

where P is power; C_{L} and C_{D} are coefficients of lift and drag, respectively; ρ_{a} is the air density at the altitude of the wing; A is the wing area and V is the wind speed. This formula disregards tether drag, wing and tether weights, change of the air density with altitude and angle of the wing motion vector to the plane, perpendicular to the wind. A more precise formula is:

$$P = {2 \over 27} \rho_a A C_L G^2 V^3$$

where G is the effective gliding ratio, taking into account the tether drag.

Example: a system with a rigid wing, having dimensions 50 m x 2 m and G=15 in the 12 m/s wind will provide 40 MW of electric power.

== Control of crosswind-kite-power source ==
Depending on the final application of a crosswind-kite-power source, differing kite control methods are used. Human control exercised during the full flight session is used in crosswind stunt kiting and kiteboarding; the same has been in place for some electricity-producing crosswind-kite-power source, e.g., by Pierre Benhaiem of France. When the crosswind-kite-power source becomes too large to handle, human-assisted devices or fully autonomous robotic control systems can be implemented. Fully passive crosswind-kite-power sources have been demonstrated, using the natural frequencies of a system to permit the absence of human or robot controls; a kited wing tossing back and forth in constant motion is a primitive passively controlled crosswind-kite-power source. Advances in computers, sensors, kite steering units, and servo-mechanisms are being applied to attain full autonomy of the launching, flying, and landing of crosswind-kite-power source that are aiming for the utility-scale energy-production market.

== Challenges ==
Some sectors of crosswind kite power are already commercially robust; the sport low altitude traction industry is one of those sectors; toy sport crosswind kite power systems kept at low altitude must remain safe. But the sectors of high altitude larger CWKPS aiming for utility-scale electrical production to compete against other forms of energy production must overcome various challenges to achieve mainstream acceptance. Some of the challenges are regulatory permissions, including use of airspace and land; safety considerations; reliable operation in varying conditions (day, night, summer, winter, fog, high wind, low wind, etc.); third-party assessment and certification; lifecycle cost modelling.

== History ==
In the early 1800s George Pocock used control of kite system wings to crosswind to good effect. In the early 1900s Paul Garber produced high speed wings by two-line controls to give targets for aircraft gunners. Crosswind kite power was brought again into focus when Miles L. Loyd carefully described the mathematics and potential of crosswind kite power in 1980. In 1980 it was not possible to create an economical automatic control system to control the wings of a kite system, though passive control of crosswinding kite systems had been ancient. With the advance of computational and sensory resources fine control of the wings of a kite system became not only affordable, but cheap. In the same time significant progress was made in the materials and wing construction techniques; new types of flexible kites with good L/D ratio have been invented. Synthetic materials suitable for the wing and tether became affordable; among those materials are UHMWPE, carbon fibre, PETE, and rip-stop nylon. A large number of people became engaged in the sports of kitesurfing, kiteboarding, kite buggying, snowkiting, and power kiting. Multiple companies and academic teams work on crosswind kite power. Most of the progress in the field has been achieved in the last 10 years.

== Prospects for crosswind kite power ==
Enthusiasm seems to be at a high level among over a thousand workers in the crosswind kite power realm that includes scales from toy scale to utility-grid. Speculation for traveling and moving goods without fuel around the world by use of CWKPS is envisioned both by systems staying connected to the ground and some systems fully disconnected from the ground. Objectives for the future discussed in the literature regard CWKPS facing toy, sport, industry, science, commerce, energy for electrical grid, sailing, and a host of other tasking applications. For CWKPS to compete with solar energy, nuclear energy, fossil fuels, conventional wind power, DWKPS, or other renewable energy sources, the levelized cost of energy from CWKPS will need to become competitive, proven, made known, and adopted; during CWKPS march into the future, other competing sectors will be advancing also. The variety of configurations of kite systems that will fly wings to crosswind for the enhanced power is expected to grow; however, for specific purposes and applications, some winning formats are expected to eventually shine. Placing wing elements that fly to crosswind on huge lofted rope-based arches or even net domes is being researched.

== Patents that involve crosswind kite power ==
Various patents have been issued relating to crosswind kite power. These include:

- US 3987987 Self-erecting windmill by Charles McCutchen and Peter R. Payne. They filed on January 28, 1975. Their work is now in the public domain.
- US8066225 Multi-tether cross-wind kite power by Benjamin Tigner filed on January 19, 2009, but has a priority date of January 31, 2008. He teaches crosswind kite farming to make electricity.
- US6781254 Windmill kite by Bryan William Roberts with priority date of November 7, 2001. This examples crosswind kite power using flying generators driven by autorotating crosswinding turbine blades which play a second roll of being driven by costing power to fly the aircraft to altitude or bring the aircraft to safe harbor. The fast motion of the crosswinding blades is mined to drive the airborne wind generators at the hub of the rotating blades. This type of machine was featured in Popular Science magazine.

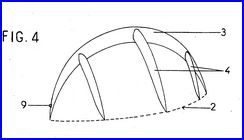
Bruno T. Legaignoux, Dominique M. Legaignoux in their patent show LEI and inflated struts. Wings taught have been being used for crosswind kite power purposes dominantly in kiteboarding and kite surfing.

- US4708078 Propulsive wing with inflatable armature by Bruno T. Legaignoux, Dominique M. Legaignoux, with priority date of November 16, 1984. This patent activity was part of the growing crosswind kite power surge that is still occurring. The inflated leading edge and inflated struts permitted aggressive mining of the wind with crosswind motions and water reachability. Similar structure technology is being used in some AWES crosswind kite power research centres around the world.

== Scale of crosswind kite power systems ==
Crosswind kite power systems are found in toy power kites, sport power kites, and experimental-handy sizes; proposed by research centres are huge utility-grid-power-feeding sizes. The power gained in toy sizes is used to excite product users; two-line and four-line crosswind toy kite-power systems fill kite festival skies. Serious sport crosswind kite power systems drive the movement of athletes around race courses in local and national competitions. Experimental-handy sizes of crosswind kite power systems are explored while furthering research toward utility-scale systems.

== Timeline of uses and progress of crosswind kite power ==
Crosswind kite power has been put to various uses throughout history. And the variety of devices that produce crosswind kite power have a historical progression. A simple kite system sitting passively without crosswind kite power production is contrasted with kite systems that fly crosswind producing greater harvesting of energy from the wind's kinetic energy. For perspective, a timeline of crosswind kite power uses and device progress may aid in understanding crosswind kite power.

- 2013: In May 2013, Google acquired a California company developing systems with onboard generators flown to crosswind in circular paths using a hybrid aircraft that double-purposes flying blades as turbine blades as well as costed-energy propellers. Their system is designed to operate as a powered aircraft when needed; the blades and generator are then converted to operate as propellers and motor.
- 2012 November: Progress is exhibited by NTS Gmbh on X-wind (crosswind) kite power system using railed cars that pull line that drives ground generator. NTS X-Wind at EcoSummit Duesseldorf. A closed loop rail with cable-connected cars work in concert to pull the loop cable. Each railed car is pulled by a four-tethered kited wing; each wing is controlled by an autopilot or kite-steering unit.
- 2012 circa: Retail market sees an entry of a crosswind kite power system by Pacific Sky Power. The crosswind elements flown are turbine blades configured in HAWT format with generator aloft at the hub of the turning blades. Their system is not a powered aircraft during any phase of its operation. The scale is of handy one-person mobile size. A pilot lifter kite is used.
- 2010 circa: Making of electricity by using onboard crosswind kite power with the cross winding elements being auto rotating HAWT blades shows by FlygenKite under French patent FR 2955627.
- 2009: Airborne Wind Energy Industry Association (AWEIA) formed to serve kite power system industry of all methods including crosswind kite power.
- 2006: Funding of KiteGen.
- 1980s: Kiteboarders demonstrate effective upwind travel by use of crosswind kite power techniques.
- Crosswind kite power used in military target practice by Paul E. Garber. The gained crosswind kite power was used to produce speed of the target wing to simulate enemy aircraft.
- 1980: May–June: Miles L. Loyd of Lawrence Livermore National Laboratory, Livermore, California, published in the Journal of Energy, Vol. 4, No. 3, Article: No. 80-4075, Crosswind Kite Power. He focused on flying the wings of kite systems "traverse" to the ambient wind; he noted that the crosswind airspeed of the wings would allow mining the involved kinetic energy for both keeping the wings flying as well as driving other loads for secondary purposes.
- 1820 circa: George Pocock demonstrated control of kite-power system to crosswind to obtain energy to draw vehicle rapidly. Many will later consider him as a father of crosswind kite power that uses the harvested wind energy for traction purposes.

== Distinguish CWKPS from non-CWKPS ==
Kite-power systems dedicated to operating without its energy-harvesting elements flying to crosswind are not CWKPS. Examples help to clarify the two branches of kite-power systems. A simple symmetrical two-stick diamond kite let out to downwind flight while the system's tether pulls to turn an at-ground generator shaft is producing energy for use by flying downwind without flying to crosswind; such is a non-CWKPS. Some hefty downwind kite-power systems (DWKPS) are proposed by serious researchers; some DWKPS instruction is found in the patent literature; one trend involves the opening and closing of pilot-kite-lifted opening-and-closing parachutes to drive generators. Notice that some CWKPS, such as Jalbert parafoil working in figure-8 patterns to turn a ground-stationed generator, could be commissioned to operate fully without flying to crosswind, and the resultant kite-power system would then be a DWKPS. Differently, the CWKPS proposed by users of the autorotating blades stay necessarily as CWKPS. Magenn Power's flip-wing kite-balloon is a DWKPS. Similar flip-wing rotating wings are DWKPS, e.g. that taught in Edwards and Evan patent. Benjamin Franklin's legendary pond-crossing by kite power was a simple DWKPS; he was merely dragged downwind by a downwind-flying kite. A non-CWPKS is historically illustrated by a kite-power harvesting system such as was used by Samuel Franklin Cody for man-lifting with the involved wings set in stable downwind flight without flying to crosswind.

== See also ==
- Airborne wind turbine
- High-altitude wind power
- Rigid kite (airborne wind energy)
- Unconventional wind turbines

== Bibliography ==
- Vance, E. Wind power: High hopes. Nature 460, 564–566 (2009). https://doi.org/10.1038/460564a
