= Rigid kite (airborne wind energy) =

Airborne wind energy system using a tethered rigid wing

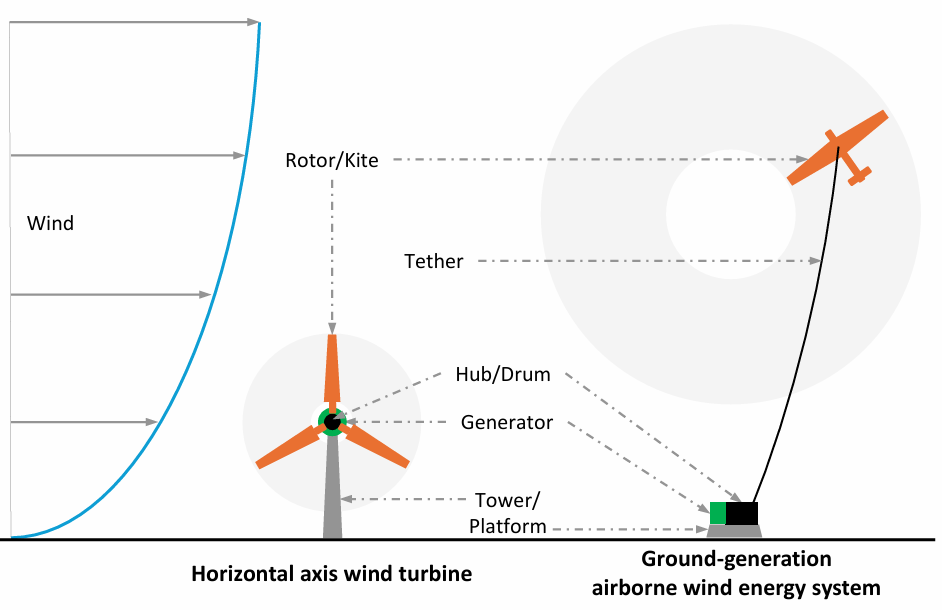
Size comparison between a conventional wind turbine and a rigid-wing kite flying crosswind circles

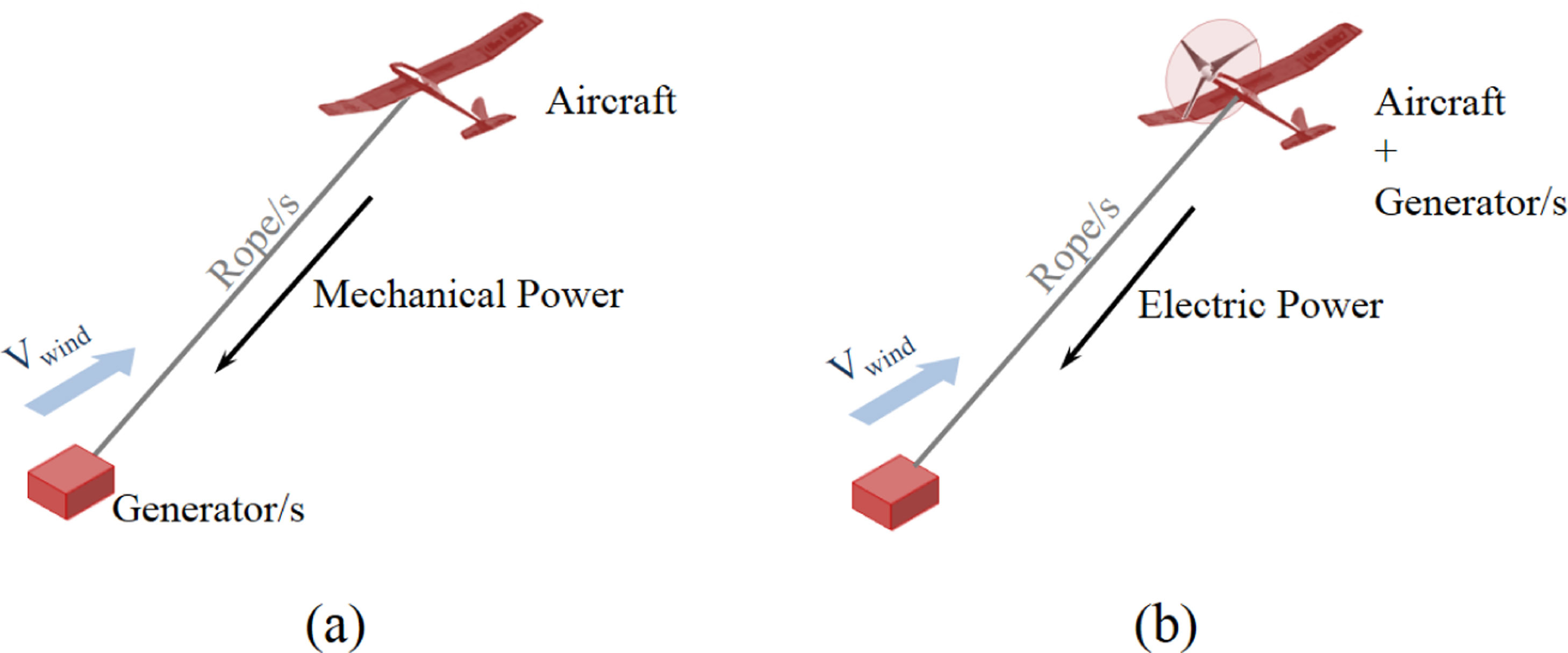
Fly-gen and ground-gen airborne wind energy systems

A rigid kite for airborne wind energy (AWE), also called a rigid-wing or fixed-wing airborne wind energy system, is a tethered, aircraft-like wing that is flown autonomously in fast crosswind loops or figure-of-eight patterns to harvest wind energy at altitudes that are generally inaccessible to conventional tower-mounted wind turbines at fraction of total material usage. Unlike soft-wing (fabric) kites, rigid kites are built from stiff materials such as fibre-reinforced composites. The rigid construction gives them substantially higher lift-to-drag ratios than soft wings, allows precise aerodynamic control using conventional control surfaces, and makes it possible to mount wind turbines directly on the wing. The theoretical basis for crosswind power generation was established by Miles L. Loyd, who showed in 1980 that a tethered wing flying crosswind can generate far more power than a wing held stationary in the wind: because the wing's airspeed greatly exceeds the ambient wind speed, the aerodynamic force it produces is comparatively very large. In Loyd's idealized analysis the available power grows with the cube of the wind speed and with the square of the wing's lift-to-drag ratio, which strongly favours aerodynamically efficient rigid wings.

Rigid kites are divided into two main categories according to where electrical power is generated. In fly-generation (fly-gen) systems, onboard turbines generate electricity as the kite moves along its high-speed crosswind trajectory, and the power is transmitted to the ground through a conductive tether; because power is extracted from the aerodynamic drag of the turbines, these are also called drag-mode systems. In ground-generation (ground-gen) systems, the kite's lift creates a high tension in the tether, which is reeled out from a ground-based drum to drive a generator; because power is extracted from the lift force, these are also called lift-mode systems. Ground-gen systems operate in a cyclic "pumping" mode, alternating between a reel-out (traction) phase and a reel-in (retraction) phase.

Beyond grid-scale electricity generation, rigid-kite platforms are being explored for adjacent applications. Their ability to loiter persistently at several hundred metres altitude with a permanent tether link makes them candidates for surveillance and security infrastructure, a market segment announced by Kitemill in 2026. The low material usage, transportability and small ground footprint of rigid-kite systems also make them attractive for power delivery in off-grid and remote locations, such as island microgrids where conventional wind farm logistics are unfeasible. In addition, a tethered wing carrying onboard sensors can serve as an atmospheric measurement platform, continuously profiling wind, temperature and other meteorological quantities at altitudes between those covered by ground masts and research aircraft.

== History ==
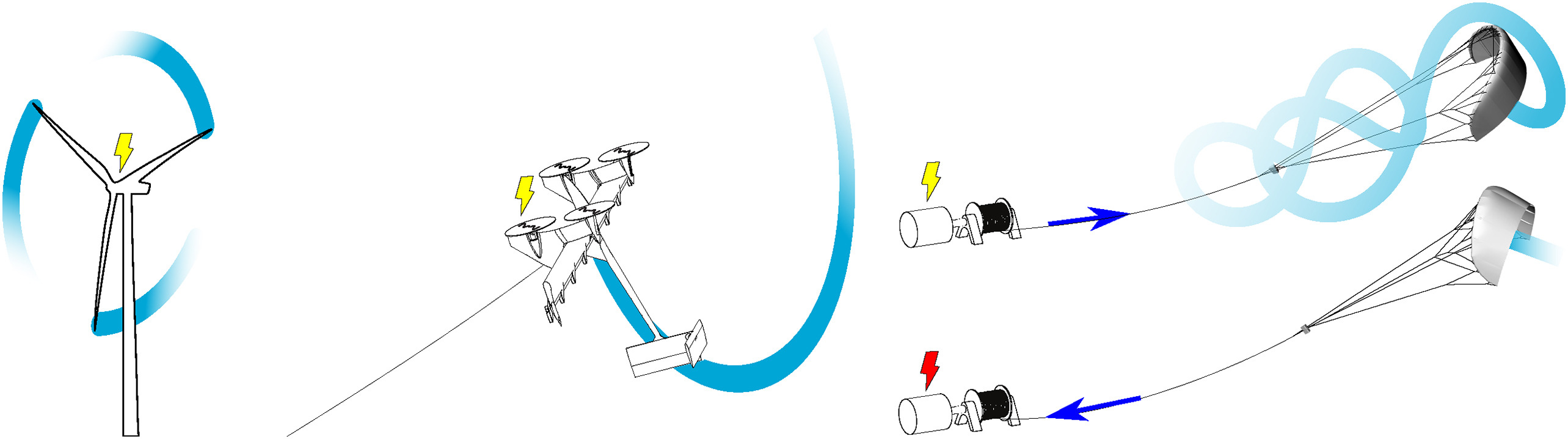
Wind turbine and airborne wind kites (rigid and soft kites)

The idea of using kites to extract energy from the wind predates modern airborne wind energy, but the quantitative foundation of the field is usually traced to the 1980 paper "Crosswind kite power" by Miles L. Loyd, from Lawrence Livermore National Laboratory. Writing in the aftermath of the 1970s energy crises, Loyd derived the now-standard expressions for the power available to a tethered wing flying crosswind, in both lift and drag mode, and estimated that a single wing of airliner size could generate several megawatts. The work received limited attention at the time, and the concept lay largely dormant for two decades before being revisited as advances in composite materials, low-cost inertial and satellite navigation sensors, embedded computing and autonomous flight control made practical systems conceivable. A growing academic community consolidated around the topic in the early 2010s, and the field's first comprehensive monograph was published in 2013.

Sustained development of rigid-wing hardware accelerated in the 2000s. Makani Power, founded in 2006 and acquired by Google in 2013, became the most prominent rigid-wing fly-gen developer. Its Wing 7 demonstrator achieved autonomous crosswind flight with onboard power generation, and the programme culminated in the M600 prototype, a rigid wing of roughly 26 m span carrying eight onboard turbines and rated at 600 kW. In 2019, Makani flew the M600 from a floating spar buoy off the coast of Norway, the first offshore demonstration of a utility-scale airborne wind energy system. Makani ceased operations in February 2020; its technical report, flight data and simulation code were subsequently released to the public.

In Europe, development concentrated on ground-generation systems. Ampyx Power, founded in 2008 in The Hague, developed rigid-wing gliders that launch and land horizontally using a catapult and onboard propellers; after a series of small demonstrators that proved autonomous pumping-cycle operation, the company built the 12 m span, 150 kW-class AP3. Ampyx Power was declared bankrupt in May 2022 after failing to secure further investment, and its concept has since 2023 been continued by Mozaero, a company formed by former Ampyx engineers. The Norwegian company Kitemill, also founded in 2008, pursued fixed-wing ground-gen systems with a vertical takeoff and landing (VTOL) subsystem; its KM1 prototype completed several hundred test flights, and in 2023 the company unveiled the 16 m span, 100 kW KM2 as its first commercial model. Kitekraft, a 2019 spin-off from the Technical University of Munich, develops a fly-gen system based on a rigid boxplane airframe.

Coordinated research efforts, including the European AWESCO and AWETRAIN doctoral training networks, IEA Wind Task 48 and the industry association Airborne Wind Europe, have since brought together the academic and industrial groups working on the technology.

== Working principle ==
=== Crosswind flight ===
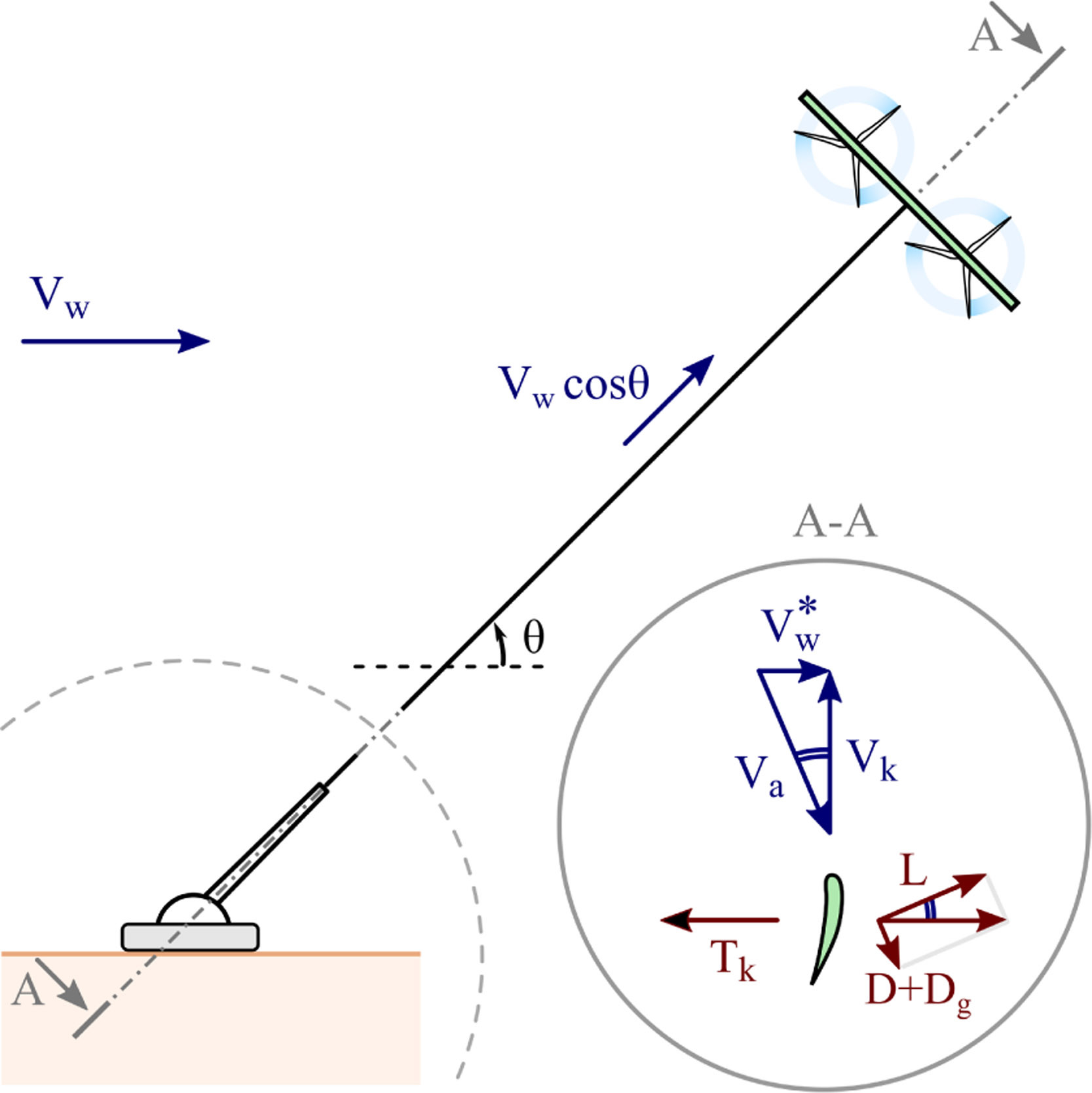
A rigid fly-gen kite flying crosswind patterns

A kite tethered to the ground can be flown within a quarter-sphere region downwind of its anchor point, often called the wind window. Rather than hovering statically, a crosswind kite is flown rapidly across the wind, roughly perpendicular to the ambient flow, so that the apparent wind experienced by the wing is dominated by the wing's own motion. In the idealized case, the wing's airspeed is approximately the lift-to-drag ratio times the wind speed, and because aerodynamic forces scale with the square of the airspeed, the resulting force can exceed that of a stationary kite by orders of magnitude. The operating principle is analogous to that of the fast-moving outer sections of a conventional wind turbine blade, which produce most of the turbine's power; a crosswind kite effectively replaces the inner blade sections, hub, tower and foundation with a lightweight tether.

=== Ground generation (lift mode) ===
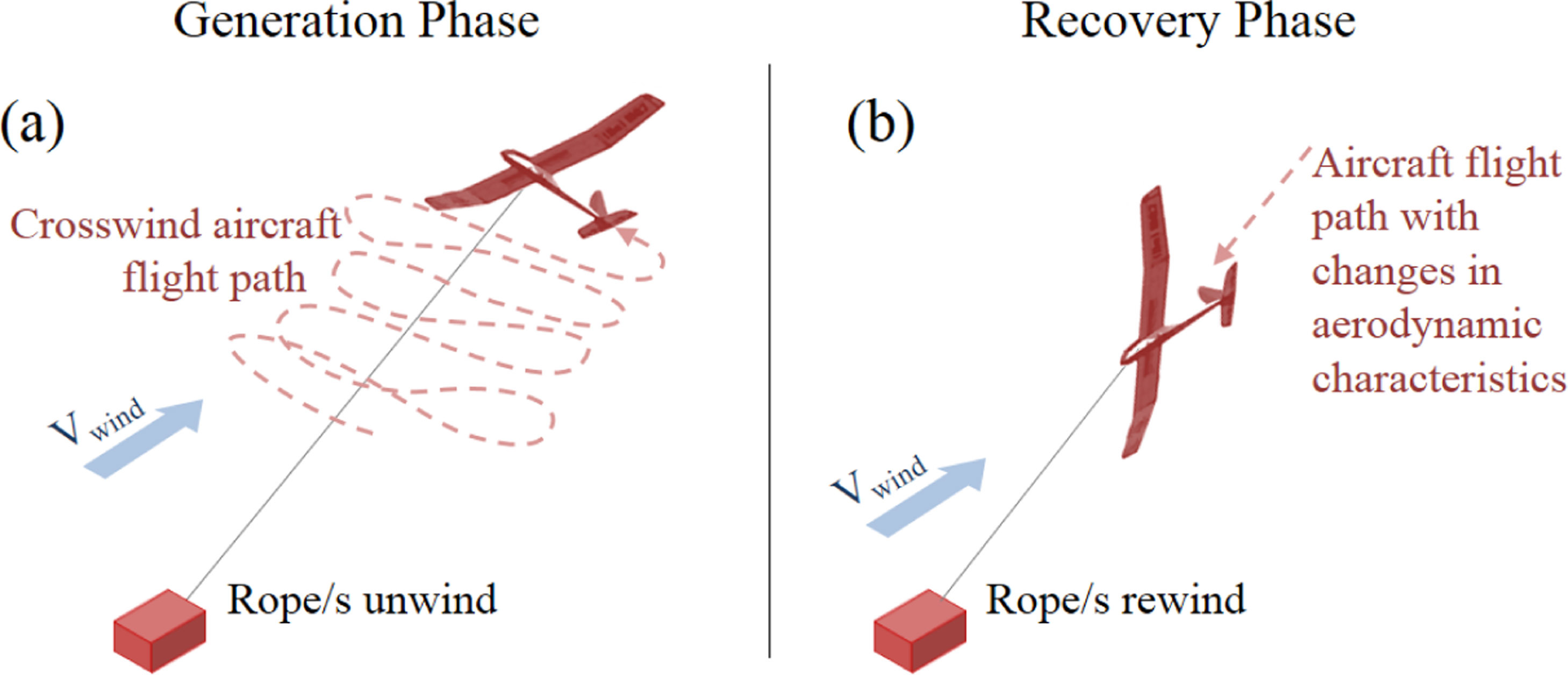
Pumping cycle of a ground-gen system

In ground-gen systems, power is produced on the ground in a two-phase pumping cycle. During the traction (reel-out) phase, the wing flies fast crosswind figure-of-eight or circular patterns, generating a high tether tension that unwinds the drum and drives the generator; in the idealized analysis, the extracted power is maximized when the reel-out speed is one third of the wind speed. During the retraction (reel-in) phase, the wing is de-powered, by reducing its angle of attack and hence its lift, and reeled back in along a low-force path, consuming only a small fraction of the energy generated during traction. The net positive energy over the cycle constitutes the harvested power, and a buffer storage or several units operated out of phase can be used to smooth the intermittent output.

=== Fly generation (drag mode) ===
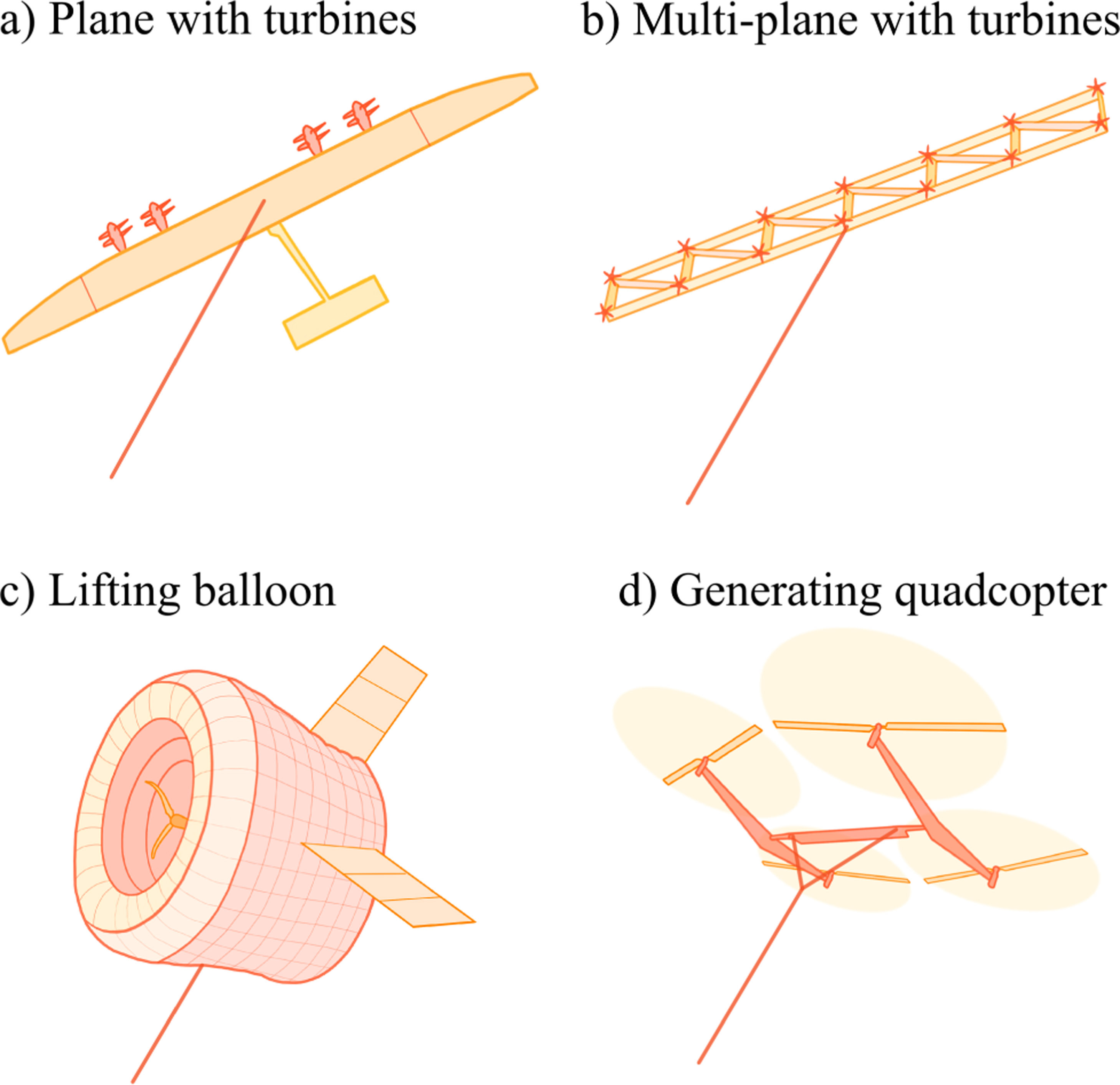
Fly-gen rigid-kite configurations

In fly-gen systems, small wind turbines mounted on the wing extract power directly from the high-speed apparent wind, adding an effective drag term to the wing; the electricity is delivered to the ground through a conductive tether at high voltage. Because the wing does not need to be reeled in, power production is nominally continuous during crosswind flight. The onboard turbines can also be operated in reverse as propellers, powered through the tether, which is how the Makani and Kitekraft systems perform vertical takeoff, hover and landing. The main penalties of the fly-gen configuration are the additional mass of the onboard drivetrain and the heavier, thicker tether required to carry electrical conductors.

=== Crosswind power limit ===
The power available to a crosswind kite scales with the cube of the wind speed and with the square of the wing's aerodynamic efficiency. Loyd's idealized result for the mechanical power of a crosswind wing in lift mode can be written as:

$$P = \frac{2}{27}\, \rho\, A\, C_L \left( \frac{C_L}{C_D} \right)^2 v_w^3,$$

where $\rho$ is the air density, $A$ the wing area, $C_L$ and $C_D$ the lift and drag coefficients, and $v_w$ the wind speed. Loyd further showed that in drag mode the power is maximized when the drag added by the onboard turbines equals one half of the wing's intrinsic drag, and that the resulting maximum is identical to the lift-mode result: in the idealized analysis, the two generation modes are equivalent. The strong dependence on the lift-to-drag ratio $C_L/C_D$ explains why rigid wings, which achieve high aerodynamic efficiency, are attractive for power generation. Practical systems fall below the ideal limit because of the nonzero elevation angle of the tether (so-called cosine losses), gravity, tether drag, and drivetrain and control losses.

== System architecture ==
A rigid-kite AWE system consists of three principal subsystems: the rigid kite (the wing or aircraft), the tether, and the ground station.

=== Wing ===
The wing is an aircraft-like composite structure carrying control surfaces and, in fly-gen designs, onboard turbines, generators and power electronics, together with the sensors, actuators, avionics and communication links required for fully autonomous flight. Compared with a conventional aircraft or glider of similar span, an kite operates at much higher lift coefficients and wing loadings and sustains continuous high-load manoeuvring flight, which drives its structural design; for large, slender wings, aeroelasticity also becomes a significant design consideration.

=== Tether ===
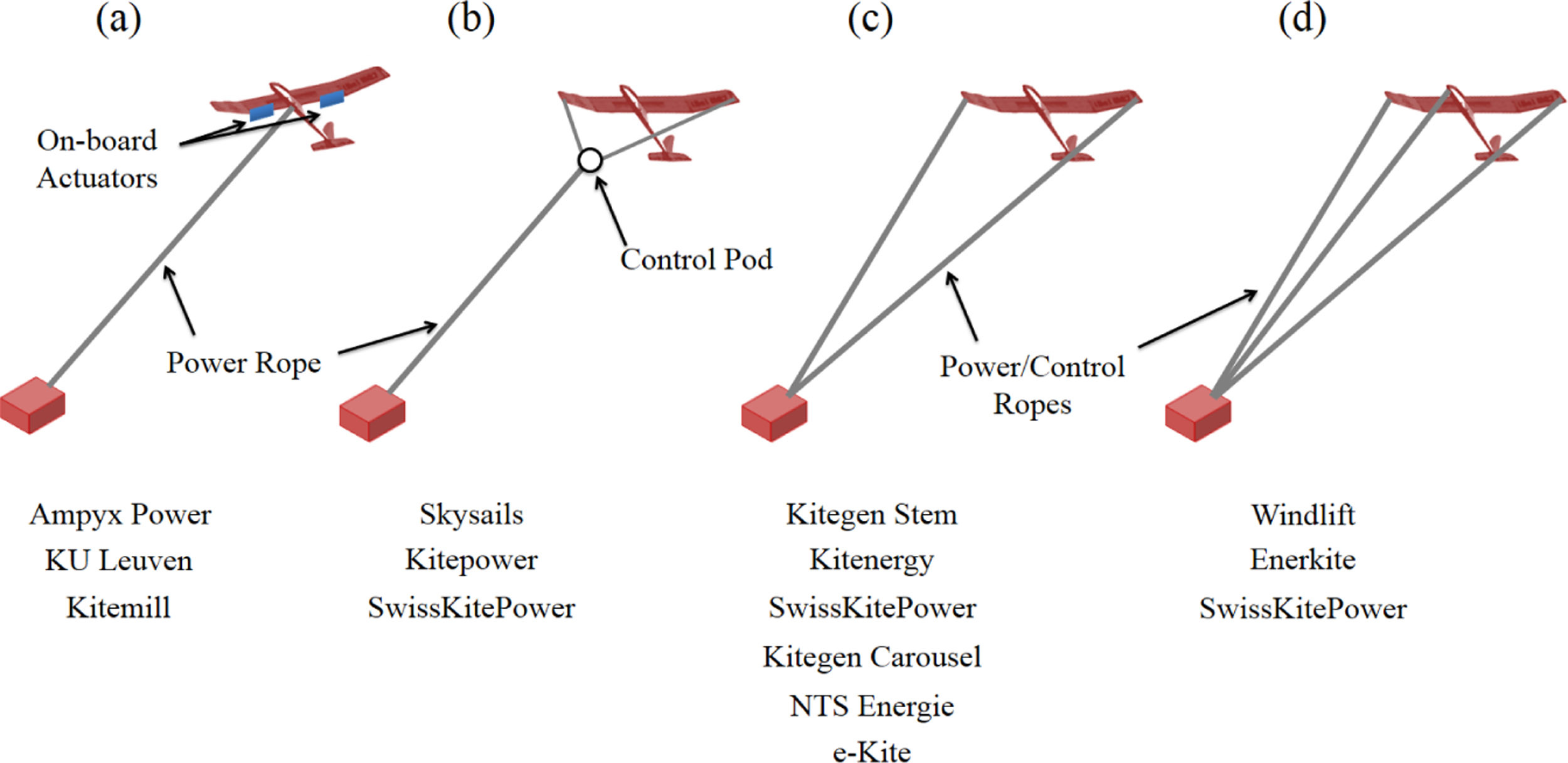
Bridle layouts used to connect the tether to rigid kites

The tether transmits force and, in fly-gen systems, electrical power between the wing and the ground, and is both a defining feature of airborne wind energy and a significant source of loss and design constraint. Tether materials are typically high-strength fibres such as ultra-high-molecular-weight polyethylene (UHMWPE), chosen for their favourable strength-to-weight ratio; in fly-gen systems the tether must additionally contain electrical conductors to carry the generated power to the ground. The tether may attach to the wing at a single point or through a bridle-line system that distributes the load over the airframe.

Aerodynamic drag on the tether grows with its length and with flight speed, and a substantial share of this drag acts as if concentrated at the fast-moving wing; for long tethers it can become a dominant contribution to the total system drag, reducing the effective lift-to-drag ratio and hence the available power. The tether's mass and elasticity also affect the system dynamics, introducing sag and elastic coupling between the wing and the ground station that must be accounted for in both modelling and control. In simulation, the tether is frequently represented either as a straight, quasi-static element or by discretizing it into a series of lumped-mass segments connected by spring–damper elements, sometimes with variable segment length to accommodate reeling. Tether wear, bending fatigue at the drum and pulleys, and the resulting replacement intervals are important contributors to operating cost.

=== Ground station ===
In ground-gen systems, the ground station houses the winch drum and an electrical machine that acts as a generator during reel-out and as a motor during reel-in, together with the power electronics -and often short-term storage- needed to convert the pulsating mechanical power of the pumping cycle into grid-compatible output. In fly-gen systems, the ground station primarily anchors and manages the tether and typically provides a perch or platform on which the kite is parked when not flying.

=== Launch and landing ===
A central design challenge for rigid kites is launching and landing, since a rigid wing cannot be deployed as simply as a soft kite and these phases must be performed autonomously and repeatedly in varying weather. Systems pursuing vertical takeoff and landing (VTOL) use rotors to lift the wing until it reaches flying speed, either the fly-gen turbines operated as propellers, as in Makani and Kitekraft, or a dedicated propeller set, as in Kitemill and TwingTec. Systems using horizontal takeoff and landing (HTOL) accelerate the wing to flight speed with an external mechanism, such as the catapult-and-onboard-propeller arrangement used by Ampyx Power, or a swivelling mast as used by EnerKíte for its semi-rigid wing. The reliability of these repeated transitions is regarded as one of the key drivers of overall system availability.

== Flight dynamics ==
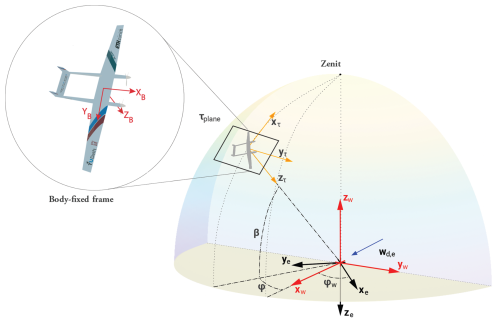
An airborne wind energy kite described in spherical coordinates

The motion of a rigid kite is commonly described using six-degree-of-freedom (6-DOF) rigid-body dynamics, capturing both the translational position of the wing along its flight path and its rotational attitude. The governing equations are derived either through a Newton–Euler formulation -closely analogous to conventional aircraft flight dynamics, but with the tether force added to the force and moment balance- or, particularly in trajectory-optimization frameworks, in natural coordinates as a constrained Lagrangian system of differential-algebraic equations (DAEs). The flight dynamics are dominated by aerodynamic, gravitational and tether forces, with the tether coupling the wing to the ground station; the relative importance of the tether force varies across the flight phases.

The attitude of the wing may be parameterized using Euler angles or, to avoid the singularity known as gimbal lock, using direction-cosine matrices or quaternions on the rotation group SO(3). Because the kite repeatedly traverses a closed loop, steady operation corresponds to a periodic orbit rather than a static trim point, and the choice of flight pattern -circular or figure of eight- affects the power output, structural loads and tether twist; which pattern is preferable remains an active research question. Several open reference models exist for rigid-kite dynamics, including the released simulator of the Makani M600 fly-gen aircraft and the multi-megawatt ground-gen reference model MegAWES, which represents a fixed-wing aircraft of 42.5 m span operated in pumping cycles.

== Aerodynamics ==
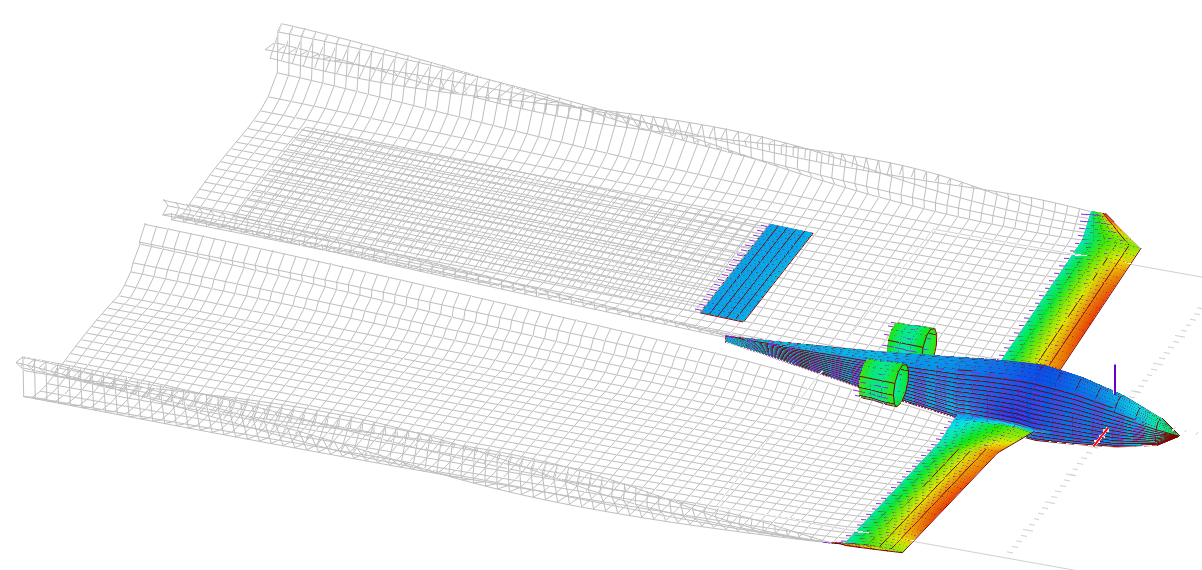
Unsteady vortex-lattice simulation of an aircraft model, one of the mid-fidelity methods applied to aircraft.

The aerodynamics of rigid kites couple the standard challenges of finite-wing aerodynamics with the unsteady, curved flight that characterizes crosswind operation. Because the harvested power scales with $C_L^3/C_D^2$ in lift mode, rigid kites are designed to fly at high lift coefficients while keeping the total drag -including that of the tether- as low as possible. Along the tightly curved figure-of-eight or circular path, the angle of attack and the apparent wind vary continuously, both over the trajectory and across the wing span, and the wing repeatedly flies close to the vortex wake it has previously shed. Even small steady deviations in angle of attack can substantially change the loads and power output, so accurate aerodynamic modelling and real-time angle-of-attack control are important.

Aerodynamic models used in the field range in fidelity from quasi-steady look-up tables of lift, drag and moment coefficients -often functions of angle of attack and sideslip- through lifting-line theory, vortex-lattice, panel and vortex-particle methods, including unsteady variants, to high-fidelity computational fluid dynamics and large eddy simulation. Wing aeroelasticity can also be significant for large, slender rigid wings. Capturing unsteady and three-dimensional effects -in particular the influence of the curved, potentially self-intersecting trajectory on the wake and the resulting induced velocities at the wing- remains an active area of research.

== Flight control ==
Rigid-kite systems require fully autonomous flight control to follow the desired crosswind trajectory, to manage the reel-out and reel-in phases (in ground-gen systems) or the onboard turbines (in fly-gen systems), and to execute launch, landing and abort procedures without human intervention. Control architectures reported in the literature span a wide range of complexity, from explicit proportional–derivative path-following laws, through cascaded guidance-and-control schemes, to nonlinear model predictive control that optimizes the trajectory subject to system constraints. Optimal-control toolchains such as AWEbox are used to compute power-optimal periodic trajectories for single- and multi-kite systems.

Flight typically requires the coordinated regulation of several quantities: the wing's flight path on the wind window, its angle of attack, and, for ground-gen systems, the tether reeling speed and force, which are managed by a feedback controller acting on the electrical machine coupled to the winch. The pumping cycle is commonly divided into traction, transition-to-retraction, retraction and transition-to-traction sub-phases, each posing distinct control requirements, and the controller must additionally handle degraded modes, faults and safe autonomous landing.

== Comparison with soft kites ==
Rigid kites are one of two main wing archetypes used in airborne wind energy, the other being soft kites (flexible-membrane) derived from surf kites and parafoils. Rigid wings achieve much higher lift-to-drag ratios and therefore higher power per unit wing area, can be steered precisely with conventional aerodynamic control surfaces, have durable airframes, and are the only archetype able to carry onboard turbines for fly-gen operation. Their disadvantages are a higher wing mass -which penalizes operation in light winds and increases the kinetic energy involved in a possible crash- more demanding autonomous launch and landing, and higher manufacturing cost. Soft kites, by contrast, are lightweight, inexpensive, packable and comparatively benign in failure.

== Notable systems ==
The largest rigid kite built and flown to date is Makani's M600; the MegAWES reference model, while only a simulation study, represents the multi-megawatt scale targeted by future utility systems.

Selected rigid-kite airborne wind energy systems
System	Developer	Configuration	Launch and landing	Wingspan	Power	Status
Wing 7	Makani (US)	Fly-gen	VTOL	≈8 m	20 kW	Retired technology demonstrator
M600	Makani (US)	Fly-gen	VTOL	≈26 m	600 kW	Programme ended in 2020
AP3	Ampyx Power / Mozaero (NL)	Ground-gen	HTOL (catapult)	12 m	150 kW class	Continued by Mozaero since 2023
KM2	Kitemill (NO)	Ground-gen	VTOL	16 m	100 kW (average cycle power)	Unveiled in 2023 as first commercial model
MegAWES	TU Delft (reference design)	Ground-gen	—	42.5 m	Multi-megawatt (design study)	Open-source simulation model

== Airborne wind energy farms ==
To utilize the technology at grid scale, multiple co-located AWE systems must be operated in proximity as an airborne wind energy farm, increasing power density and sharing infrastructure such as the electrical grid connection and the land or sea area used. Because the energy generated per unit ground area is a key metric for competitiveness with conventional wind farms, the spacing and layout of the individual systems are central design questions.

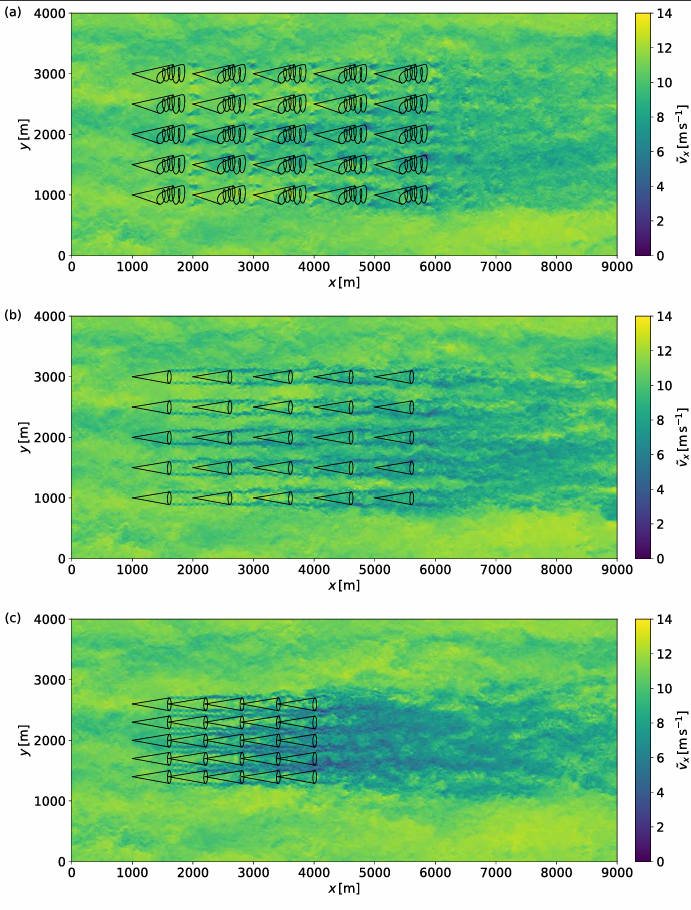
Wakes in an airborne wind energy farm computed with CFD simulation

The principal challenge is aerodynamic interaction between neighbouring units. Each crosswind kite sheds wingtip vortex that persists downstream, and a kite operating in the wake of an upstream unit encounters a modified inflow -reduced wind speed and increased turbulence- that lowers its power output and can raise its uneven structural loading. This is analogous to the wake-loss problem in conventional wind farms, but it is complicated by the looping, potentially self-intersecting wake topology of a crosswind kite and by the large volume each kite sweeps, which make the interaction strongly three-dimensional and unsteady.

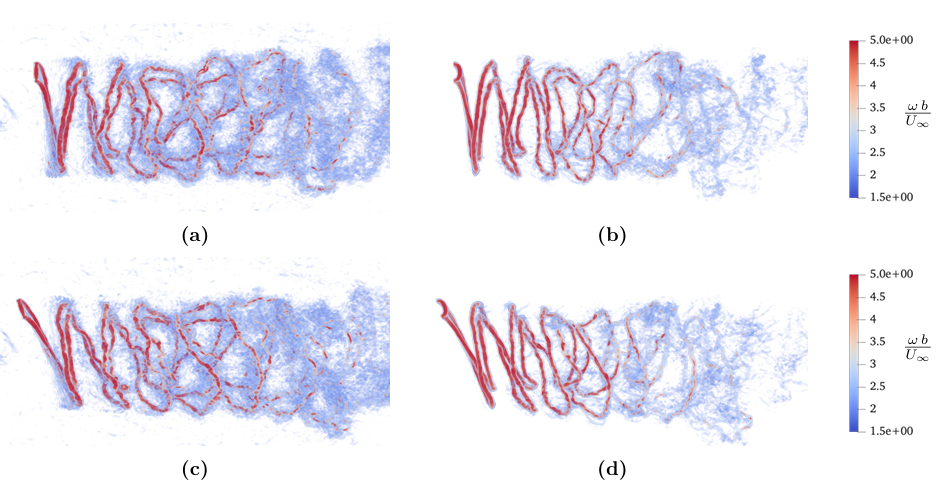
Wake of an airborne wind energy kite flying(rigid and soft) on a circular trajectory(straight and inclined), computed with large-eddy simulation

Predicting these effects requires wake models ranging from fast prescribed-field engineering models to high-fidelity vortex methods and large eddy simulation; LES has been used to quantify wake development and farm-level power losses for both ground-gen and fly-gen rigid-kite farms. Farm-level research also addresses the coordination of flight trajectories to reduce mutual interference and the trade-off between packing density and per-unit performance. Closed-loop control at farm scale remains an open research area, as existing multi-kite control schemes address only a small number of interacting units rather than a full farm.

== Challenges ==
Rigid-kite AWE systems face several challenges that have so far limited commercial deployment. Autonomous launching and landing of a rigid wing is mechanically demanding and a frequent point of system failure. Reliable, fully autonomous operation across a wide range of wind and weather conditions, long-duration durability of the tether and airframe, operation in shared airspace, and certification for routine flight all remain difficult. Power output in pumping ground-gen systems is intermittent because of the cyclic nature of the traction and retraction phases, requiring smoothing for grid integration. The high-profile wind-down of Makani in 2020 and the bankruptcy of Ampyx Power in 2022 underscored the gap between successful prototype demonstrations and economically viable utility-scale systems.

== Research directions ==
Research directions for rigid-kite AWE include scaling systems toward the multi-megawatt range, as explored by reference designs such as MegAWES and by system-level scaling studies, and deployment in offshore environments, where high, consistent winds and the reduced material footprint of AWE are particularly advantageous. Further work targets improved autonomous control and reliability, more accurate unsteady aerodynamic and wake models, and the study of wake interactions between multiple kites operating together in AWE farms, which will influence achievable power density and farm layout. Multi-kite concepts, in which several aircraft share a single main tether to reduce tether drag losses, are investigated using optimal control frameworks. Coordinated research networks and open-source models continue to develop the shared tools and standards needed to move the technology toward commercialization.

== See also ==
- Airborne wind energy
- Ampyx Power
- Crosswind kite power
- High-altitude wind power
- Makani (company)
- Wind power
