= Laddermill =

Kite system

A laddermill kite system is an airborne wind turbine consisting of a long string or loop of power kites. The loop or string of kites (the "ladder") would be launched in the air by the lifting force of the kites, until it is fully unrolled, and the top reaches a height determined by designers and operators; some designers have considered heights of about 30,000 feet (9,100 meters), but the concept is not height-dependent. The laddermill method may use one endless loop, two endless loops, or more such loops.

== Introduction ==
In a 2007 "road map" report on renewable energy adopted by the European Parliament, laddermill technology was listed among various "promising and challenging" new energy sources into which revenue from emissions trading could be reinvested.

== Operating modes ==
There are currently two operating modes considered:

- The kites pull up the long string on which they are tethered, and the resulting energy is then used to drive an electric generator. When the end of the string is reached the pull force of the kites is reduced by changing the angle of attack of the kites "wing shape", and the string is then rewound with the electric generator acting as a motor, or by other means. If the string is reduced to its minimum length the next energy generating cycle is started by restoring the angle of attack of the kites to maximum lift.
- Kites on one side of a wire loop generate lift while the ones on the other side do not because the angle of attack of the kites "wing shape" changes when the kite passes the top of the loop. So the kites pull up only one end of an endless loop, causing the loop to start to rotate, and the resulting released energy is then used to drive an electric generator.

== Design ==
A "rotating loop" "LadderMill" project was designed and developed by the Dutch ex-astronaut and physicist Wubbo Ockels. As quoted from his website:

The LadderMill is the response to the challenge for exploiting the gigantic energy source contained in the airspace up to high altitudes of 10 km. The concept has been developed with the aim to convert wind energy at altitude in electricity on the ground in an environmental and cost effective manner.
