= Southwest Windpower =

Former wind turbine manufacturer

- Company type: Private
- Industry: Wind Power
- Founded: 1 January 1987
- Founder: David Calley and Andy Kruse
- Headquarters: Denver, CO, USA; Flagstaff, AZ, USA; Cologne, Germany
- Products: Small wind turbines

Southwest Windpower (SWWP) was a wind turbine manufacturer established in 1987 based in Flagstaff, Arizona, United States. The company specialized in small, reliable battery charging wind generators that complement photovoltaics (solar energy or PV) in supplying energy to rural areas.

Southwest Windpower closed for business in the first quarter of 2013.

The remaining Skystream assets were acquired by Xzeres wind in July 2013. Xzeres CEO Frank Greco had been the CEO of Southwest Windpower.

== Certifications ==
In 2000, SWWP became the first wind turbine manufacturer to receive Underwriters Laboratories (UL) and International Electrotechnical Commission (IEC) certification, for its AIR series wind turbines. Southwest Windpower’s latest turbine, the Skystream 3.7, has a rotor diameter of about 12 feet (3.7 m) and can generate up to half an average U.S. home's energy in optimal winds. It is the first residential-scale wind generator designed specifically for the grid-connected home or small business.

Skystream was the first device to be spun out of the U.S. Department of Energy's Wind Energy Program. That program includes the National Renewable Energy Laboratory Wind Technology Center in Boulder CO. Andrew Kruse estimates that one Skystream will produce about 100 MWh of energy over its 20-year design life. At a typical total installed cost of $15,000, that gives an average energy cost of 9 cents per kilowatthour.

In 2011 the company received a Statement of Compliance from Germanischer Lloyd which confirms that Skystream 3.7 meets the requirements of the IEC Standard 61400-2:2006, Edition 2, "Design requirements for Small wind turbines," which addresses safety philosophy, quality assurance and engineering integrity of the turbine.

The Small Wind Certification Council (SWCC) issued a consumer label and certification in 2011 that validated manufacturer claims for Skystream 3.7 performance, reliability and safety were accurate.

External videos
- Altaeros Prototype 2012

A Skystream 3.7 has been tested as an airborne wind turbine in an Altaeros helium-filled balloon.
