= NTS GmbH =

NTS Energie- und Transportsysteme GmbH
- Company type: Private
- Industry: Wind Energy
- Founded: 2006
- Key people: Uwe Ahrens
- Number of employees: 11
- Website: Official website

NTS Energie- und Transportsysteme GmbH was founded in 2006 in Berlin, Germany by Uwe Ahrens.The company is developing X-Wind technology (spoken: Cross-Wind). This technology combines two technologies - automatically steered kites and generators on a rail system - to produce electricity. A closed loop rail with cable-connected cars work in concert to pull the loop cable. Each railed car is pulled by a four-tethered kited wing; each wing is controlled by an autopilot or kite-steering unit.

In July 2012, NTS GmbH had tested 400 meters linear test track in Freidland, Germany. Closed loop prototype is under construction at Mecklenburg-Vorpommern, Germany.

== Existing investors ==
- KfW - 8,8 %
- Ecognized - 15,1 %
- FFF ca. - 21,2 %
- Uwe Ahrens - 54,9 %

== Advisory board ==
- Mario Caroli: General Manager Bankhaus Ellwanger & Geiger
- Dr. Henner Gladen: MAMA Sustainable Incubation AG
- Dr. Martin Wienkenhöver: Cabb Chemicals, former board member Lanxess AG and Nordzucker AG

== Awards ==
- February 2009, KIS-Forum Brussels: “Most Successful company”
- September 2009, EVC, Lisbon: “Best Cleantech Company”
- November 2009, 2. Münchner Cleantech-Konferenz: Best Presenting Company
- December 2009, EVC Barcelona: Finalist “Top 25” of the best European Venture Opportunities
- September 2010, ecolink+, Vienna: Best Presenting Company
- Nov. 2010 European Venture Contest, Luxembourg: Best Cleantech Company
- October 2012, Eureka Venture Forum Istanbul, Best presenting Company
