= Airborne wind energy =

Direct use or generation of wind energy

Airborne wind generator concept

Airborne wind energy (AWE) is the direct use or generation of wind energy by the use of aerodynamic or aerostatic lift devices. AWE technology is able to harvest high altitude winds, in contrast to wind turbines, which use a rotor mounted on a tower.

The term high-altitude wind power (HAWP) has been used to refer to AWE systems. However, semantically HAWP might also include wind energy conversion systems that are somehow positioned at a large height from the ground or sea surface.

Various mechanisms are proposed for capturing the kinetic energy of winds such as kites, kytoons, aerostats, gliders, gliders with turbines for regenerative soaring, sailplanes with turbines, or other airfoils, including multiple-point building- or terrain-enabled holdings. Once the mechanical energy is derived from the wind's kinetic energy, then many options are available for using that mechanical energy: direct traction, conversion to electricity aloft or at ground station, conversion to laser or microwave for power beaming to other aircraft or ground receivers. Energy generated by a high-altitude system may be used aloft or sent to the ground surface by conducting cables, mechanical force through a tether, rotation of endless line loop, movement of changed chemicals, flow of high-pressure gases, flow of low-pressure gases, or laser or microwave power beams.

== High-altitude wind for power purposes ==
Winds at higher altitudes become steadier, more persistent, and of higher velocity. Because power available in wind increases as the cube of velocity (the velocity-cubed law), assuming other parameters remaining the same, doubling a wind's velocity gives 2^{3}=8 times the power; tripling the velocity gives 3^{3}=27 times the available power. With steadier and more predictable winds, high-altitude wind has an advantage over wind near the ground. Being able to locate HAWP to effective altitudes and using the vertical dimension of airspace for wind farming brings further advantage using high-altitude winds for generating energy.

High-altitude wind generators can be adjusted in height and position to maximize energy return, which is impractical with fixed tower-mounted wind generators.

In each range of altitudes there are altitude-specific concerns being addressed by researchers and developers. As altitude increases, tethers increase in length, the temperature of the air changes, and vulnerability to atmospheric lightning changes. With increasing altitude, exposure to liabilities increase, costs increase, turbulence exposure changes, likelihood of having the system fly in more than one directional strata of winds increases, and the costs of operation changes. HAWP systems that are flown must climb through all intermediate altitudes up to final working altitudes—being at first a low- and then a high- altitude device.

An atlas of the high-altitude wind power resource has been prepared for all points on Earth. A similar atlas of global assessment was developed at Joby Energy.

== Methods of capturing kinetic energy of high-altitude winds ==
Energy can be captured from the wind by kites, kytoons, tethered gliders, tethered sailplanes, aerostats (spherical as well as shaped kytoons), bladed turbines, airfoils, airfoil matrices, drogues, variable drogues, spiral airfoils, Darrieus turbines, Magnus-effect VAWT blimps, multiple-rotor complexes, fabric Jalbert-parafoil kites, uni-blade turbines, flipwings, tethers, bridles, string loops, wafting blades, undulating forms, and piezoelectric materials, and more.

When a scheme's purpose is to propel ships and boats, the objects tether-placed in the wind will tend to have most of the captured energy be in useful tension in the main tether. The aloft working bodies will be operated to maintain useful tension even while the ship is moving. This is the method for powerkiting sports. This sector of HAWP is the most installed method. Folklore suggests that Benjamin Franklin used the traction method of HAWP. George Pocock was a pioneer in tugging vehicles by traction.

=== Controls ===
HAWP aircraft need to be controlled. Solutions in built systems have control mechanisms variously situated. Some systems are passive, or active, or a mix. When a kite steering unit (KSU) is lofted, the KSU may be robotic and self-contained; a KSU may be operated from the ground via radio-control by a live human operator or by smart computer programs. Some systems have built sensors in the aircraft body that report parameters like position, relative position to other parts. Kite control units (KCU) have involved more than steering; tether reeling speeds and directions can be adjusted in response to tether tensions and needs of the system during a power-generating phase or return-non-power-generating phase. Kite control parts vary widely.

== Methods of converting the energy ==
The mechanical energy of the device may be converted to heat, sound, electricity, light, tension, pushes, pulls, laser, microwave, chemical changes, or compression of gases. Traction is a big direct use of the mechanical energy as in tugging cargo ships and kiteboarders. There are several methods of getting the mechanical energy from the wind's kinetic energy. Lighter-than-air (LTA) moored aerostats are employed as lifters of turbines. Heavier-than-air (HTA) tethered airfoils are being used as lifters or turbines themselves. Combinations of LTA and HTA devices in one system are being built and flown to capture HAWP. Even a family of free-flight airborne devices are represented in the literature that capture the kinetic energy of high-altitude winds (beginning with a description in 1967 by Richard Miller in his book Without Visible Means of Support) and a contemporary patent application by Dale C. Kramer, soaring sailplane competitor, inventor.

The principle of the kite airborne wind turbine. Image source: Kitesforfuture

A possible flight path of the kite airborne wind turbine. Image source: Kitesforfuture

A research on airborne wind turbine technology innovations reveals that the “Kite type AWTs” technique, the most common type, has high scope of growth in the future; it has contributed for about 44% of the total airborne wind energy during 2008–2012. The kite type AWTs extract energy through wind turbines suspended at high altitudes using kites such as multi-tethered kite, kite and dual purpose circular fan, rotary wing kites etc.

=== Electric generator position in a HAWP system ===
Electricity generation is just one of the options for capturing mechanical energy; however, this option dominates the focus of professionals aiming to supply large amounts of energy to commerce and utilities. A long array of secondary options include tugging water turbines, pumping of water, or compressing air or hydrogen. The position of the electric generator is a distinguishing feature among systems. Flying the generator aloft is done in a variety of ways. Keeping the generator at the mooring region is another large design option. The option in one system of a generator aloft and at the ground station has been used where a small generator operates electronic devices aloft while the ground generator is the big worker to make electricity for significant loads.

=== Carousel generator ===
The “Carousel” configuration several kites fly at a constant height and higher altitudes, pulling in rotation a generator that moves on a wide circular rail. For a large Carousel system, the power obtained can be calculated as of the order of GW, exposing a law that see the power attainable as a function of the diameter raised to the fifth power, while the increment of cost of the generator is linear.

=== Aerostat-based HAWP ===
One method of keeping working HAWP systems aloft is to use buoyant aerostats whether or not the electric generator is lifted or left on the ground. The aerostats are usually, but not always, shaped to achieve a kiting lifting effect. Recharging leaked lifting gas receives various solutions. In case of productive winds the aerostats are typically blown down by the aerodynamic drag applied on the wide and unavoidable Reynolds surface excluding them de facto from the HAWP category.

- W. R. Benoit US Patent 4350897 Lighter than air wind energy conversion system by William R. Benoit, filed Oct 24,1980, and issued: Sep 21, 1982.
- The TWIND system ( International patent application PCT/W02010/015720) is based on the use of a sail surface elevated by the climbing force of an aerostatic balloon connected to the ground by a cable used also for energy transmission. The wind present at high altitudes creates a horizontal push on the sail which in its movement transmits this energy to the ground via the connecting cable. At the end of its movement forward, the sail surface is reduced allowing it to move upwind with reduced energy waste.
- The Magenn aerostat is a vertical-axis wind turbine held with its axis horizontal by bridling the axis traverse to the wind so that Magnus-effect lift obtains during autorotation; the electricity is generated with end-hub generators.
- The LTA Windpower PowerShip uses lift from both an aerostat and wings. It operates close to neutral buoyancy and doesn't require a winch. Power is generated by turbines with the propellers on the trailing edge of the wings. The system is designed to be able to take off and land unattended.
- Airbine proposes to lift wind turbines into the air by use of aerostats; the electricity would return to ground loads by way of conductive tether.
- Airship power turbine by William J. Mouton, Jr., and David F. Thompson: Their system integrated the turbine within the central portion of a near-toroidal aerostat, like putting a turbine in the hole of an aerostat donut.
- The HAWE system is developed from Tiago Pardal's idea. This system consists of a pumping cycle similar to that of kite systems. In the generation phase, the pulling force increases 5–10 times due to the Magnus effect of a spinning cylinder (aerial platform). Like a kite, the pulling force produced by the aerial platform will unwind the cable and generate electricity on the ground. In the recovery phase it rewinds the cable with no Magnus effect in the aerial platform.
- Wind Fisher is developing cross-wind capable Magnus effect balloons which generate electricity with ground based generators operating a pumping cycle with a pair of helium inflated, lighter-than-air cylindrical wings. The company, based near Grenoble, is currently testing a 1.7m span heavier-than-air prototype.
- An open source concept, released in 2023, proposed a helium-filled balloon with attached sails, which create pressure and drive the rotation of the system around its horizontal axis. The kinetic energy is transferred to a generator on the ground through ropes in circular motion.

== Non-airborne systems ==
Conceptually, two adjacent mountains (natural or terrain-enabled) or artificial buildings or towers (urban or artificial) could have a wind turbine suspended between them by use of cables. When HAWP is cabled between two mountain tops across a valley, the HAWP device is not airborne, but borne up by the cable system. No such systems are known to be in use, though patents teach these methods. When non-cabled bridges are the foundation for holding wind turbines high above the ground, then these are grouped with conventional towered turbines and are outside the intent of HAWP where the tethering an airborne system is foundational.

== Safety ==
Lightning, aircraft traffic, emergency procedures, system inspections, visibility marking of system parts and its tethers, electrical safety, runaway-wing procedures, over-powering controls, appropriate mooring, and more form the safety environment for HAWP systems.

== Challenges as an emerging industry ==
There have been several periods of high interest in HAWP before the contemporary activity. The first period had a high focus on pulling carriages over the lands and capturing atmospheric electricity and lightning for human use. The second period was in the 1970s and 1980s when research and investment flourished; a drop in oil price resulted in no significant installations of HAWP. Return on investment (ROI) has been the key parameter; that ROI remains in focus in the current development activity while in the background is the renewable and sustainable energy movement supporting wind power of any kind; but HAWP must compete on ROI with conventional towered solutions. A test center at Lista, Norway provides independent verification of research.

== Early references to HAWP ==
Early centuries of kiting demonstrated that the kite is a rotary engine that rotates its tether part about its mooring point and causes hands and arms to move because of the energy captured from higher winds into the mechanical device. The tension in the lofted devices performs the work of lifting and pulling body parts and things. Airborne wind energy (AWE) for HAWP was birthed thousands of years ago; naming what happened and developing the implied potentials of tethered aircraft for doing special works is what is occurring in AWE HAWP. What is "low" for some workers is "high" for others.

- 1796 George Pocock used traction mode to travel in vehicles over land roads.
- 1827 George Pocock's book ‘The Aeropleustic Art’ or 'Navigation in the Air by the Use of Kites or Buoyant Sails' was published. Pocock described use of kites for land and sea travel. The book was republished several times.
- 1833 John Adolphus Etzler saw HAWP blossoming at least for traction.
- 1864? Book's chapter Kite-Ship well describes key dynamics of HAWP used for tugging ships by kites. John Gay's: or Work for Boys. Chapter XVIII in the Summer volume.
- 1935 Aloys van Gries stands as a strong early patentee of high-altitude wind power; he taught various kite systems for use in generating electricity in his DE 656194 C patent: Durch Drachen getragene Windkraftmaschine zur Nutzbarmachung von Hoehenwinden
- 1943 Stanley Biszak instructed using potential energy in free-flight for converting ambient winds impacting turbine to drive electric generator to charge batteries.
- 1967 Richard Miller, former editor of Soaring magazine, published book Without Visible Means of Support that describes the feasibility of free-flight coupled non-ground-moored kites to capture differences in wind strata to travel across continents; such HAWP is the subject of Dale C. Kramer's contemporary patent application.
- 1973? Hermann Oberth In the appendix of his book Primer for Those Who Would Govern there are sketches and a photograph of a model of the Kite Power Station from the Oberth Museum.
- 1977 April 3, 1977, invention declared. On September 21, 1979, Douglas Selsam notarized his kite-lifted endless chain of airfoils HAWP system, generic type that would later show in Dutch astronaut Wubbo Ockels' device called LadderMill described in a patent of 1997. Douglas Selsam conceived his Auto-oriented Wind Harnessing Buoyant Aerial Tramway on April 3, 1977. On the Selsam notarized disclosure of invention was placed a date of Sept. 20, while the notary placed the final signing on Sept. 21, 1979. notes and drawings.
- 1979 Professor Bryan Roberts begins giromill gyrocopter-type HAWP wind generator development.
- 1980 Miles Loyd publishes an article on the crosswind kite power.
- 1986 Bryan Roberts' AWE HAWP rotor generates electricity and lifts itself in tethered flight.
- 1992 Free Rotor WO/1992020917 Free Rotor by JACK, Colin, Humphry, Bruce (one man). Colin Jack. Colin Bruce. Multi-rotors are treated. Faired tethers are recognized. 1992.

== Autorotation ==
Autorotation is the basis of a large sector of AWE technology. High altitude wind power research and development centers frequently are dependent on blade autorotation: SkyMill Energy, Joby Energy, Sky Windpower, BaseLoad Energy, Magenn Power, and Makani Power are making and testing airborne wind energy conversion systems (AWECS) that employ autorotation of blades to drive the shafts of generators to make electricity at altitude and send the electricity to earth via conductive tethers.

== See also ==
- Airborne Wind Energy Industry Association
- Airborne wind turbine
- Altitude
- Betz' law
- Crosswind kite power
- Kite applications
- KiteGen
- Kite types
- Laddermill
- Linear Generation system
- List of airborne wind energy organizations
- Rigid kite (airborne wind energy)
- Tether
- Turbine
- Wind
- Wind farm
- Wind power
- Wind profile power law
- Wind resource assessment
- Wind turbine

== Bibliography ==
- Vance, E. Wind power: High hopes. Nature 460, 564–566 (2009). https://doi.org/10.1038/460564a
