= Bas Lansdorp =

Dutch entrepreneur (born 1977)

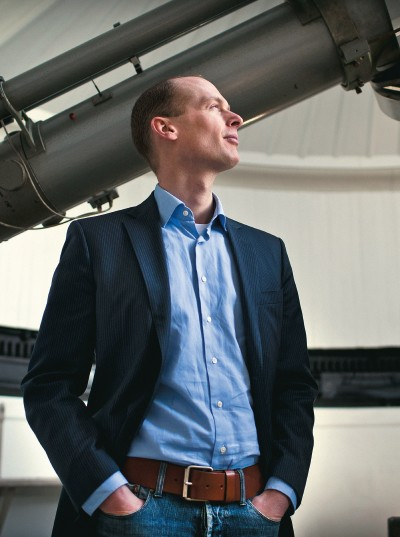
- Born: 5 March 1977 (age 49)
- Education: University of Twente
- Occupations: Inventor, entrepreneur
- Known for: CEO of Mars One

Bas Lansdorp (born 5 March 1977) is a Dutch entrepreneur best known as the co-founder and CEO of the defunct Mars One.

== Mars One ==
Lansdorp became determined to establish the first permanent human colony on Mars during his studies at the University of Twente. His primary focus was not on overcoming the technological challenges, rather the business model.

Until 2013, he allegedly financed almost the entire project himself. There are two entities to the Mars One: Mars One Foundation and Mars One Ventures. Mars One is non-profit and funded by donations. Mars One implements and manages the mission, trains astronauts, owns the hardware, etc. Mars One Ventures is a for-profit entity of Mars One and holds exclusive monetization rights around the mission. Revenue from the monetization is expected to increase as the venture progresses.

On 28 December 2013, Lansdorp did an "Ask Me Anything" on Reddit and had to face much criticism and skepticism about Mars One. He responded to the criticism positively, he said “Since we started Mars One in March 2011, we received support from scientists, engineers, businessmen and – women and aerospace companies from all over the world. The announcement of our plan in May 2012 resulted in the engagement of the general public, and the support from sponsors and investors. To see our mission evolve this way feels like my dream is becoming a reality."

Two scientists from the Massachusetts Institute of Technology (MIT), Sydney Do and Andrew Owens, produced a study claiming that Mars One’s proposal as it stood would see its astronauts die in 68 days. In order to regain credibility, Lansdorp agreed to a debate with Do and Owens on the feasibility of the Mars One project.

The debate was held in April 2015 at the Catholic University of America in Washington, D.C., and was titled “Is Mars One Feasible?”. It also included Barry Finger, VP of Engineering at the Paragon Space Development Corporation and one of the key people involved in the Mars One project. During the debate, Finger conceded that the technical analysis from MIT was mostly correct, while Mars One's CEO Bas Lansdorp admitted that their 12-year plan for landing humans on Mars by 2027 was "mostly fiction".

On January 15, 2019, Mars One filed for bankruptcy.

== Ampyx Power ==
In 2008, Lansdorp founded Ampyx Power with Richard Ruiterkamp in order to create a more modern and efficient way to harvest wind energy. He was involved in the design process of new aircraft and project overview from 2008 to 2011. In 2011, he sold his shares in the company in order to found Mars One.

== See also ==
- Mars One
- NASA
