= Jip =

Jip or JIP may refer to:

== People ==
=== Given name ===
- Kim Jip (1574–1656), Korean scholar
- Kwon Jip (born 1984), South Korean footballer
- Jip van den Bos (born 1996), Dutch racing cyclist

=== Surname ===
- Ye (surname) (Chinese: 葉), romanized Jip in Cantonese

== Arts and entertainment ==
- Jip (Doctor Dolittle), a fictional dog
- Jip and Janneke, a series of children's books
- Jip, His Story, a 1996 children's book by American novelist Katherine Paterson
- Mister Jip, a fictional character belonging to the Marvel Comics Universe
- The beloved dog of Dora Spenlow in the Charles Dickens 1850 novel David Copperfield

== Other uses ==
- Japan Innovation Party, a political party
- Jamaat-e-Islami Pakistan, an Islamist political party
- JNK interacting proteins; see JNK
- Slang term for semen

== See also ==
- Gyp (disambiguation)
- Jip Jip Conservation Park, Marcollat, South Australia
