= Gyp =

Gyp or GYP may refer to:

== People ==
- Gyp Casino, Swedish drummer Jesper Sporre (born 1961)
- Gyp Mills, English sculptor and songwriter David John Mills (born 1946-2019)
- Angelo DeCarlo (1902–1973), American mobster nicknamed "Gyp"
- Harry Horowitz (c. 1889–1914), Jewish-American gangster nicknamed "Gyp the Blood"
- Sibylle Riqueti de Mirabeau (1849–1932), French author and activist, pen name "Gyp"

== GYP ==
- GYP (software), a build software automation tool
- Global Yellow Pages, a real estate developer and digital search company based in Singapore, New Zealand and Australia
- IATA airport code for Gympie Airport, in Queensland, Australia

== Other uses ==
- Gypsophila paniculata, a species of flowering plant often called "gyp" by florists
- Gyp Rosetti, a character in Boardwalk Empire
- Gyp Mountain (British Columbia), near Falkland, British Columbia, Canada
- Gyp Mountain (Missoula County, Montana) - see List of mountains in Missoula County, Montana, United States

== See also ==
- Gyps, a genus of Old World vultures
- Jip (disambiguation)
