= Airborne Wind Energy Industry Association =

Airborne Wind Energy Industry Association (AWEIA) was founded in 2009 to globally serve and represent companies and institutions dedicated to developing airborne wind energy technology by use of tethered and free-flight aircraft (airborne wind energy AWE); the tethered and free-flight mode is in contrast to using non-tethered ground-connected wind turbines. Founders: Dave Santos, Joe Faust, John Oyebanji, and Wayne German. AWEIA is a member of Global Wind Energy Council. AWEIA is the first global-serving member of GWEC dedicated to airborne wind energy technology.

Regional bodies affiliated with AWEIA exist of necessity to serve diverse regions.

== See also ==
- High altitude wind power
- Airborne wind turbines
- List of airborne wind energy organizations
