= American Wind Energy Association =

American trade association

The American Wind Energy Association (AWEA) was a Washington, D.C.–based national trade association formed in 1974, representing wind power project developers, equipment suppliers, service providers, parts manufacturers, utilities, researchers, and others involved in the wind industry.

AWEA promoted wind energy as a clean source of electricity for consumers in the U.S. and around the world and has around 1,000 member organizations.

The group was succeeded in January 2021 by the American Clean Power Association.

== Legislative efforts ==
AWEA staff lobbied the U.S. Congress to promote policies encouraging investment in wind energy and provide statistics and data on the wind industry. Additionally, they made policy recommendations and testify on various issues.

AWEA supported policies which it asserted will generate investment in the U.S. economy, improve U.S. energy security, and slow climate change, including extension of the federal Production Tax Credit (PTC) and Investment Tax Credit (ITC) for wind energy, establishment of a national Renewable Electricity Standard (RES), adoption of climate change policy that recognizes wind energy as a major near-term option for reducing greenhouse gas emissions, support for efforts to strengthen and expand the U.S. electric transmission system, and support for a strong federal wind energy research program.

== Annual industry conference ==
AWEA hosted the annual WINDPOWER Conference & Exhibition, which was the largest annual wind conference and exhibition in the world. WINDPOWER featured an exhibition of wind energy technology, including large-scale components, as well as presentations on industry trends, technology developments, and renewable energy policy developments.

== Wind Tower Standardization Efforts ==
In December 2009, AWEA coordinated with the Telecommunications Industry Association's Engineering Committee, to research and formulate recommendations to address the technical aspects of the design and maintenance of structures supporting small wind turbines based upon the approaches outlined in the existing communications tower standard.

== Other ==
AWEA's CEO, Tom Kiernan, was formerly President of the National Parks Conservation Association.

== American Clean Power Association merger ==
In September 2020, AWEA announced plans to merge with a newly formed organization, the American Clean Power Association (ACP), which would represent a broader spectrum of renewable energy technologies beyond wind alone. The merger followed AWEA's 2019 pivot toward a "pan-renewables" model, launched through its CLEANPOWER exhibition, which brought together wind, solar, energy storage, and transmission interests under a unified advocacy platform. The merger was completed in January 2021, at which point AWEA was formally succeeded by ACP.

The newly formed ACP subsequently expanded further, merging with the U.S. Energy Storage Association (ESA) in January 2022 to consolidate advocacy for wind, solar, storage, and transmission under a single "clean power" umbrella.

== See also ==
- Solar Energy Industries Association
- Global Wind Energy Council
- World Wind Energy Association (WWEA)
- Airborne Wind Energy Industry Association
- European Wind Energy Association
- List of notable renewable energy organizations
- Renewable energy in the United States
- Wind power in the United States
- List of wind farms in the United States
- List of wind farms
- List of onshore wind farms
- List of large wind farms
- List of wind turbine manufacturers
- American Council on Renewable Energy
- Wind ENergy Data & Information (WENDI) Gateway
- Telecommunications Industry Association
