= Formula AE =

Solar and wind powered car

The Formula AE is a solar and wind powered car. The initial startup is by solar power. As the car travels at faster speeds, strategically placed air intakes are designed to direct air flow to power the wind turbines. The a body is made of lightweight aluminum and super strong steel, and the motor has a power output of 212 kilowatts. With the Formula AE, to achieve an acceleration of 0 to 60 mph will take less than four seconds. A full battery would enable the driver to travel more than 200 miles or to race around a track for an hour.
