= Ampyx Power =

Dutch airborne wind energy company (2008–2022)

- Type: B.V.
- Industry: Airborne wind energy
- Founded: September 2008
- Founders: Bas Lansdorp, Dr. Richard Ruiterkamp
- Headquarters: The Hague, the Netherlands
- Area served: Australia and the Netherlands

Ampyx Power was a Dutch company based in The Hague whose aim was to develop utility-scale airborne wind energy systems. The company was founded in 2008 by Bas Lansdorp and Dr. Richard Ruiterkamp.

== History ==
=== Founding ===
Originally, the company was a team that former astronaut Wubbo Ockels formed at Delft University of Technology to investigate how heat, wind, and friction energy could be converted into electricity. The team consisted of several scientists, including team leader Richard Ruiterkamp and Wubbo Ockels. Bas Lansdorp later stepped in as a business manager.

The company's original prototypes were tethered flexible membrane kites but then began to work on fixed wing aircraft. The company now consists of 50 employees of which 40 are engineers.

=== Technology development ===
Ampyx Power proved its concept with three generations of prototypes (AP0 – AP2) constructed between 2009 and 2013.

==== 2009 - 2012: AP0 Prototypes ====
Ampyx Power showed that power production with a tethered aircraft is feasible with the first prototype, AP0.

==== 2012: AP1 Prototype - First Autonomous 1 Hour Flight ====
Ampyx Power reached a significant milestone in 2012 by showing fully autonomous power production for the first time. During a 50-minute flight, the possibility of autonomous operation was demonstrated. Many investors, such as EON, noticed the company at this point and started to take interest in Ampyx Power take on wind power.

==== 2015: AP3 Design Started ====
Ampyx Power started the design of the last prototype AP3. The goal of AP3 was to prove scaling and robust continuous operation. Upon completion of AP3, the technology matured to a state that the commercial type can be defined. In December 2016 Orange Aircraft in Breda started the production of AP3. The company had also commissioned an assessment of the ecological impact of the technology. The technology was used as an example for a life-cycle assessment of airborne wind energy.

==== April 2017: Ampyx Power and EON cooperation ====
On April 17, 2017, Ampyx Power signed a cooperation agreement with German energy company EON. Under the contract, EON and Ampyx Power collaborated to realize an AP3 and AP4 test site in Ireland. Following successful demonstration of AP3 and AP4 the companies continued with the first offshore test site and the subsequent re-powering of early EON offshore projects to prolong the technical lifetime.

==== April 2018: Sea Air Farm research ====
The cost of offshore wind power increases significantly with water depth, due to the increased costs of foundation works either bottom-fixed or floating. Due to its much smaller overturning moments, Ampyx Power system, which generates electricity from wind using an aircraft flying 500m high, could be deployed on relatively small anchored floating platforms, allowing economically possible deployment of AWES in places where deployment of conventional offshore wind turbines is economically or technically impossible.

The project, called the ‘Sea-Air-Farm’ project, was performed by a consortium of Ampyx Power, ECN (Energy Research Centre Netherlands), Marin (Maritime Research Institute Netherlands) and Mocean Offshore. The consortium researched the offshore application of floating AWES and the possibilities and limitations of an entire airborne wind park with multiple systems, far-offshore and in deep waters. The project was carried out with subsidy of Topsector Energy from the Ministry of Economic Affairs.

ECN validated the aerodynamic tools, modelled installation and O&M scenarios, and calculated the yield and costs. Mocean Offshore designed the floating platform with its mooring and infield cables, which were tested in Marin's test basin. Ampyx Power designed the conceptual aircraft and the entire offshore wind farm, studied the certification framework, and managed the project.

The research indicates that a wind farm is technically possible and cost competitive. The figures are promising for the future of AWES, given the fact that MW-scale AWES are still at the very early stages of their technological and commercial development, and significant further cost reductions can be expected in the future. A public summary was published in April 2018.

=== Bankruptcy ===
In 2021 a new funding round was prepared, but never realized. This resulted in a lack of funds. On April 19, 2022, Ampyx applied for, and received, a suspension of payments from the court of The Hague. However, management failed to find new investors, and on May 4 bankruptcy was declared.

=== Asset transfer to Mozaero ===
The collapse of Ampyx Power in 2022 put over ten years of research in airborne wind energy at risk, including the chance of their aircraft taking flight. However, some committed engineers decided not to let these efforts be in vain. They committed to completing the aircraft's development and achieving flight, leading to the creation of Mozaero

== See also ==
- Wind power
- Airborne wind energy
