= KiteGen =

KiteGen is a concept for a wind harnessing machine for high altitude winds, developed in Italy. The vertical axis rotation is intended to eliminate the static and dynamic problems that limit the size of conventional wind turbines. The prototype STEM yo-yo is under construction at Berzano di San Pietro in Italy.

== History ==
The KiteGen was originally conceived by Italian researcher Massimo Ippolito. While observing kite surfers, Ippolito noticed the large amount of energy that the kite could collect and thought that a similar system could produce electricity. This idea seemed so risky that Ippolito put it aside for years.

== Structure ==
The problem of capturing the wind is solved by the use of Power Wing Profiles (Power kites) whose movements are controlled automatically by a computer. The kites are tied by cables to a structure that rotates, generating electricity. This structure is the turbine, while the kites are the "blades".

The kites are flown on a predetermined trajectory, that can transform the exerted force on the cable, to an overall mechanical torque which rotates the vertical axis turbine. About 20 automatically controlled kites can keep rotating a turbine of 1,600 meters diameter at a speed of 15 revolutions per hour. This can generate 1 Gigawatt of power, equivalent to a medium size nuclear power station but with an estimated capital cost 10 times lower. In other words, 1 cubic Km of sky is able to provide 1 GigaWatt of power for 80% of the time in a year.

The long cables allows them to reach heights over 500 meters, where wind is strong, without introducing structural weaknesses.

== High-altitude wind ==
There are two wind flow bands that envelope Earth. One is in the Southern Hemisphere at the latitude of Patagonia, while the other is in the Northern Hemisphere over Europe. The flow height ranges from 800 meters up to 10,000 meters, while the width is 4,000 or 5,000 km. The average power of the wind is about 2 kW per square meter.

High-altitude wind is much more powerful and constant than that at earth level, which is intense in very few places, and at full speed for only about 1,700-1,800 hours per year, which limits the annual production of energy.

KiteGen plans to use wind at around 800 meters altitude with average speeds of 7 m/s and specific power of 200 W/m$^2$. For example, a section of wind width of 1,000 meters at an altitude between 600 and 1,000 meters has a power of 400*1000*200 = 80 MW.

The conceptual prototype in the Province of Asti which would work with nine generators and up to 10,000 m altitude would generate a peak power of 27 MW. A park of Kitegens with 100 MW peak power should produce 500 GWh/year; enough for 86,000 households

The Kitegen can operate about 6000 hours per year.

== Funding ==
In June 2006, KiteGen had been selected to receive public funding from the Italian Ministry for Economic Development. Although the project received a "priority B" score, the procedure evaluation was not done because of a lack of funds. Funding, performance evaluation, and capital adequacy is proceeding from the evaluator agency (Sanpaolo-Intesa Bank).

Under the 7th Framework Program of the European Union, an elaboration of the project within the transport sector was rated "excellent" and received €3 million in funding to create a system for generating electricity aboard ships, traction and management of ancillary services (proposal No. 218,691; acronym: "KitVes"). In November 2008, the European Union informed that the provision of funds will start "soon".

== Mobilegen ==
In August 2006, a prototype named Mobilegen was tested. This was a truck mounted system which is mobile and uses the low-altitude wind. A mobile generator of the second generation was tested in September 2007 at Francesco Cappa airport located in Casale Monferrato (Province of Alessandria, Italy). The unit called KSU1 used a kite that flew to 800 meters with automatic controls. The experiments lasted three days and required special permits from civil and military aviation.

== Aluminum smelter ==
In September 2012, KiteGen made an offer to the Government of Italy to power the aluminium smelter operated by ALCOA in Portoscuso. The plant is the biggest energy user in Italy with 2.3 Twh/year. KiteGen planned a farm of 200 generators in 1 square kilometer near the plant to generate 300 MW of power with availability of 5000 hours per year. The costs of construction can be written off in nearly 2 years with energy costs around 30 €/Mwh. For comparison, Glencore offer for the smelter want to relieve it only if the energy is cheaper than 37 €/Mwh by state aids because high power costs of nearby Sulcis Coal Power Station (around 70 €/Mwh) are the main reason for ALCOA to leave Sardinia.

== See also ==
- Airborne wind turbine
- Wind energy
- Renewable energy
- Alternative energy
- High altitude wind power
- Kite applications: Energy generation
- Rigid kite (airborne wind energy)
