= Airborne wind turbine =

High-altitude flying turbine for generating electricity

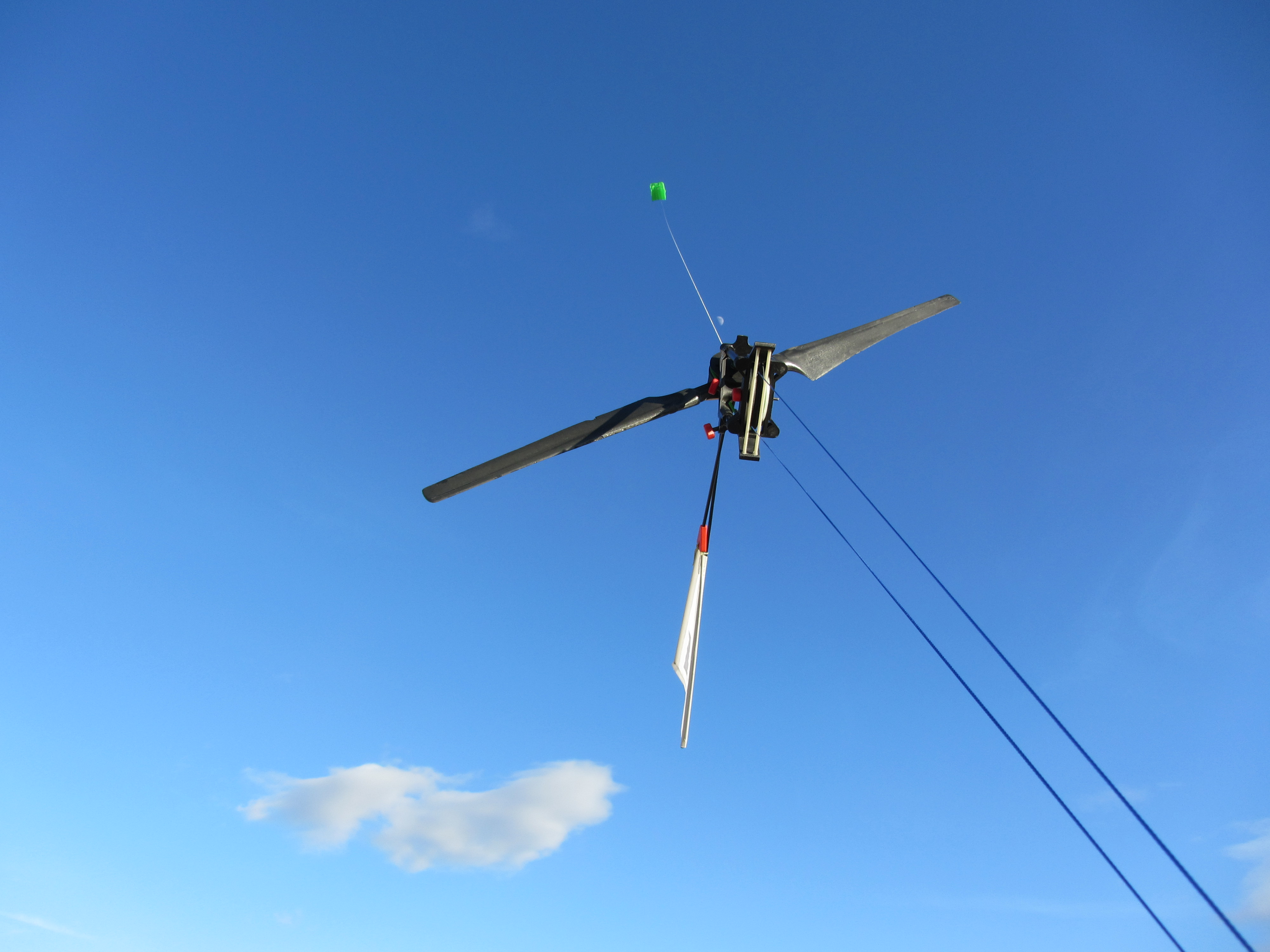
Kiwee One: an airborne wind turbine

An airborne wind turbine is a design concept for a wind turbine with a rotor supported in the air without a tower, thus benefiting from the higher velocity and persistence of wind at high altitudes, while avoiding the expense of tower construction, or the need for slip rings or yaw mechanism. An electrical generator may be on the ground or airborne. Challenges include safely suspending and maintaining turbines hundreds of meters off the ground in high winds and storms, transferring the harvested and/or generated power back to earth, and interference with aviation.

Airborne wind turbines may operate in low or high altitudes; they are part of a wider class of Airborne Wind Energy Systems (AWES) addressed by high-altitude wind power and crosswind kite power. When the generator is on the ground, then the tethered aircraft need not carry the generator mass or have a conductive tether. When the generator is aloft, then a conductive tether would be used to transmit energy to the ground or used aloft or beamed to receivers using microwave or laser. Kites and helicopters come down when there is insufficient wind; kytoons and blimps may resolve the matter with other disadvantages. Also, bad weather such as lightning or thunderstorms, could temporarily suspend use of the machines, probably requiring them to be brought back down to the ground and covered. Some schemes require a long power cable and, if the turbine is high enough, a prohibited airspace zone. As of 2022, few commercial airborne wind turbines are in regular operation.

== Aerodynamic variety ==
An aerodynamic airborne wind power system relies on the wind for support.

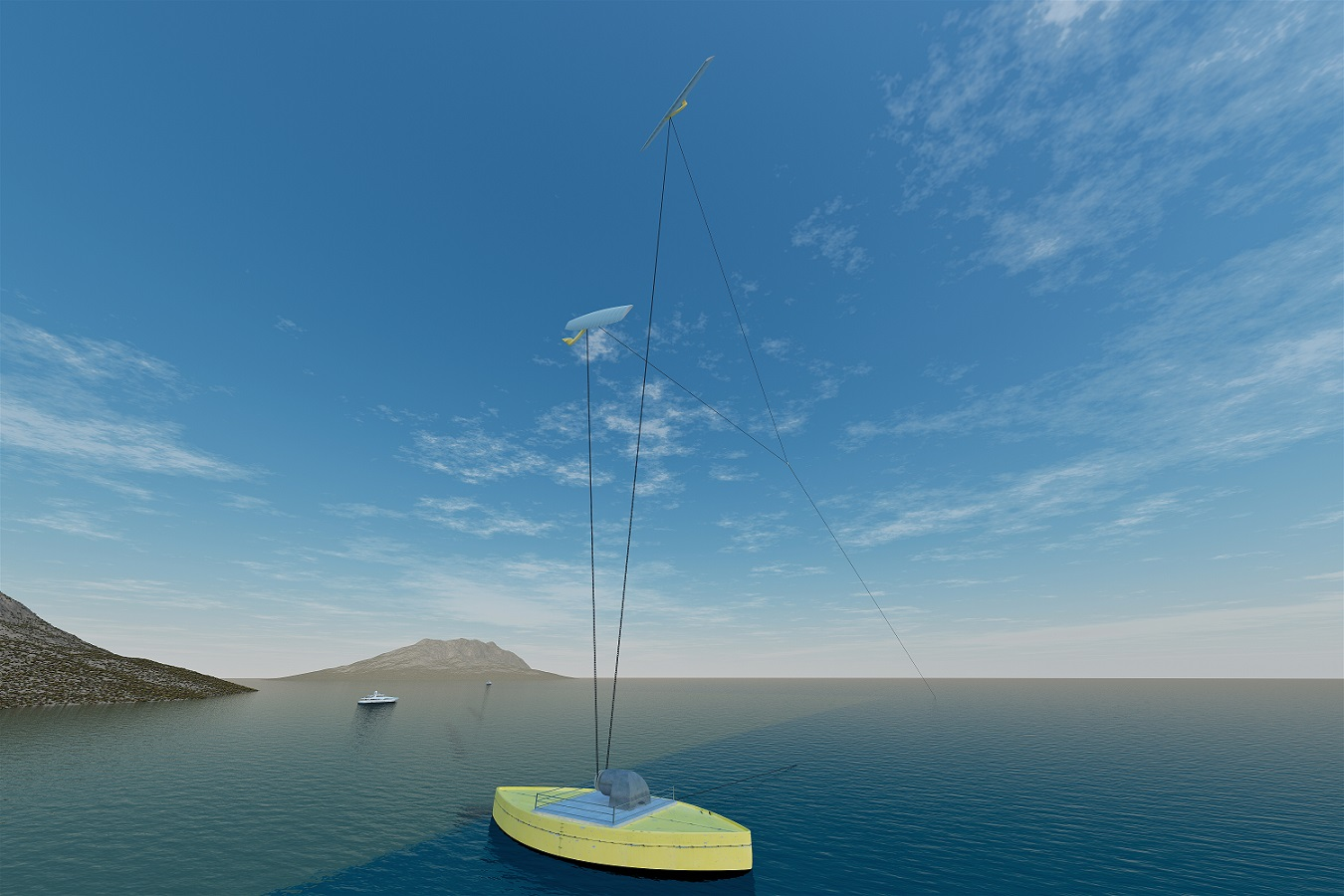
Crosswind kite generator with fast motion transfer

In one class, the generator is aloft; an aerodynamic structure resembling a kite, tethered to the ground, extracts wind energy by supporting a wind turbine. In another class of devices, such as crosswind kite power, generators are on the ground; one or more airfoils or kites exert force on a tether, which is converted to electrical energy. An airborne turbine requires conductors in the tether or some other apparatus to transmit power to the ground. Systems that rely on a winch can instead place the weight of the generator at ground level, and the tethers need not conduct electricity.

The principle of the kite airborne wind turbine. Image source: Kitesforfuture

A possible flight path of the kite airborne wind turbine. Image source: Kitesforfuture

Aerodynamic wind energy systems have been a subject of research interest since at least 1980. Multiple proposals have been put forth but no commercial products are available. Other projects for airborne wind energy systems include:

- Ampyx Power
- Kitepower
- KiteGen
- Rotokite
- HAWE System
- SkySails
- X-Wind technology
- Makani Power crosswind hybrid kite system
- Windswept and Interesting Kite Turbine Ring to Ring Torque Transfer
- Kitemill

== Aerostat variety ==
An aerostat-type wind power system relies at least in part on buoyancy to support the wind-collecting elements. Aerostats vary in their designs and resulting lift-to-drag ratio; the kiting effect of higher lift-over-drag shapes for the aerostat can effectively keep an airborne turbine aloft; a variety of such kiting balloons were made famous in the kytoon by Domina Jalbert.

Balloons can be incorporated to keep systems up without wind, but balloons leak slowly and have to be resupplied with lifting gas, possibly patched as well. Very large, sun-heated balloons may solve the helium or hydrogen leakage problems.

An Ontario based company called Magenn was developing a turbine called the Magenn Air Rotor System (MARS). A future 1,000-foot (300 m)-wide MARS system would use a horizontal rotor in a helium suspended apparatus which is tethered to a transformer on the ground. Magenn claims that their technology provides high torque, low starting speeds, and superior overall efficiency thanks to its ability to deploy higher in comparison to non-aerial solutions. The first prototypes were built by TCOM in April 2008. No production units have been delivered.

Boston-based Altaeros Energies uses a helium-filled balloon shroud to lift a wind turbine into the air, transferring the resultant power down to a base station through the same cables used to control the shroud. A 35-foot prototype using a standard Skystream 2.5kW 3.7m wind turbine was flown and tested in 2012. In fall 2013, Altaeros was at work on its first commercial-scale demonstration in Alaska.

Another concept, released in 2023, proposed a helium-filled balloon with attached sails, which create pressure and drive the rotation of the system around its horizontal axis. The kinetic energy is transferred to a generator on the ground through ropes in circular motion.

== See also ==
- High-altitude wind power
- Ram air turbine

== Bibliography ==
- Vance, Erik (2009). "Wind power: High hopes". Nature. 460 (7255): 564–566. doi:10.1038/460564a.
- Houska, Boris; Diehl, Moritz (5 July 2007). "Optimal control for power generating kites". 2007 European Control Conference (ECC). pp. 3560–3567. doi:10.23919/ECC.2007.7068861. ISBN 978-3-9524173-8-6.
