= Index of kite articles =

This index of kite articles (excluding persons whose name is "Kite" with exceptions for noteworthy flight connections); excluding articles on birds called "kites" for which see Kite (bird). Excluded also are works of literature, film, and non-flight art, non-tethered airplane names, and articles on non-aeronautical kiting like in gaming, programming, or money. What is included are aeronautical kite system topics.

Topics included below specially affect the kite's wing, kite's essential tether, kite's mooring, uses of kites, kite applications, and kite control systems. Events and people that have noteworthy impact on the world of aeronautical kites are included. Science and engineering articles that highly impact the kite world are included. Paravane (water kite) articles are included.

== A ==
- Arc kite
- Airborne wind turbine

== B ==
- Bali Kite Festival
- Ballooning (spider), or kiting
- Bermuda kite
- Bow kite
- Bowed kite
- Box kite

== C ==
- Category:Kite festivals

== D ==
- Domina Jalbert

== F ==
- Fighter kite
- Foil kite
- Francis Melvin Rogallo

== H ==
- Hang gliding
- High altitude wind power

== I ==
- Indoor kite
- Inflatable single-line kite

== K ==
- Kite
- Kite aerial photography
- Kite applications
- Kite boarding
- Kite buggy
- Kite control systems
- Kite-Eating Tree
- Kite landboarding
- Kite line
- Kite mooring
- Kite running
- Kite skating
- Kite skiing
- Kitesurfing
- Kite types
- Kites on Ice, festival

== L ==
- Leading edge inflatable kite
- Let's Go Fly A Kite, song

== M ==
- Malay kite
- Manja (kite)
- Man-lifting kite

== P ==
- Paravane (water kite)
- Peter Powell (kite)
- Power kite

== S ==
- Sled kite
- Smithsonian Kite Festival
- Soft single skin kite
- Sport kite

== T ==
- Tetrahedral kite
