= Supported leading edge =

Supported leading edge kite (SLE) is a type of power kite used mainly for kitesurfing.

It refers to a C shaped kite leading edge inflated (LEI) kite where the lines which control the angle of attack (or sheeting) of the kite attach to a bridle via a pulley in a similar way to that of a bow kite. Due to the wider range of angle of attack possible, relative to the wind, this system has vastly improved C kites' ability to depower and has increased the possible wind range.

== See also ==
- Kitesurfing
- Snowkiting
- Power kite
- Bow kite
- Foil kite
- Kite types
- Kite applications
- Kite line
- Kite mooring
- Kite control systems
