= Rigid-framed power kite =

A Rigid-framed power kite is one of the power kites which consists of a single skin and a rigid frame. They are often used in the popular sport of kite surfing. Typically it has four lines and a pair of handles; or a particular style of bar, again with 4 lines. (See also kite control systems) The best known commercial kite of this type is the Peter Lynn C-Quad.

This type of foil kite is related to the leading edge inflatable kite and the bow kite, which have a similar shape but typically do not include a rigid frame.
