= Kite control systems =

Kite types, kite mooring, and kite applications result in a variety of kite control systems. Contemporary manufacturers, kite athletes, kite pilots, scientists, and engineers are expanding the possibilities.

Kite control systems encompass a range of methods and technologies used for maneuvering and stabilizing kites in various applications. These systems have evolved from simple manual controls, to intricate automated and powered configurations, reflecting the spectrum of kite uses from recreational activities, to scientific research and energy generation. The development and refinement of these control systems have significantly expanded the capabilities and applications of kites, sometimes changing them from traditional leisure objects, into tools for modern-day purposes.

High-altitude kite control systems, especially notable in record-setting flights, incorporate advanced mechanisms such as on-board angle-of-attack adjusters. These systems are designed to manage kite line tension, often limiting it to a safe threshold to prevent breakage or loss of control. These high-altitude kites feature safety and tracking mechanisms like radio beacons for detection over long distances and strobe lights for enhanced visibility. The complexity of these systems shows the significant engineering and design efforts, aimed at maximizing the performance and safety of kites in challenging conditions.

In kite-fighting and recreational use, single-line control systems dominate, with the human operator mastering specific movements to control the kite. These movements include tugs, jerks, releases, and directional shifts, essential for maneuvering the kite in desired patterns or engaging in aerial combat. The evolution of control systems in this area highlights the blend of skill, tradition, and technological innovation in kite flying. Historical control systems, such as those developed by the Wright brothers and George A. Spratt, have played a key role in the broader field of aviation, illustrating the interconnectedness of kite technology with the development of flight.

Modern kite control systems extend into various specialized fields, including medium-length-tethered power kites and high-altitude electricity-generating wind-power kite systems. Power kites, controlled by multiple lines, are used for adjusting braking, and distorting the kite's shape for specific functionalities. These kites find applications in sports, renewable energy, and scientific research. The control systems are often complex, involving patented technologies to manage the forces at play. Kite aerial photography and governable gliding parachutes show the versatility of kite control systems, adapting traditional kite flying techniques for purposes like photography, payload delivery, and sport parachuting. There is ongoing innovation in kite control technology, including the exploration of solar sail and plasma kites for space applications.

== Single-line kite control systems ==
=== High-altitude attempt single-line control systems ===
On-board angle-of-attack mechanisms were used in the 2000 altitude record-making flight; the operators' designed adjuster limited kite line tension to not more than 100 pounds by altering the angle of attack of the kite's wing body. The kite's line had a control: a line payout meter that did not function in the record-setting flight. However, some special tether line lower end used bungee and pulley arrangements to lower the impact of gusts on the long tether. Control of a kite includes how other aircraft see the kite system; the team placed a radio beacon (using two-meter frequency detectable for 50 miles) on the kite; for sight visibility, strobe lights were hung from the kite's nose. Control via use of reels and pulleys become critical when tension is high; the team had to repair and replace parts during the flight session.

=== Auxiliary control ===
Auxiliary devices have been invented and used for controlling single-line kites. Devices on board the kite's wing can react to the kite-line's tension or to the kite's angle of attack with the ambient stream in which the kite is flying. Special reel devices allow kite-line length and tension control. Moving the kite's line lower end left or right or windward or anti-windward forms part of the control system of single-line kites. Devices at the kite's bridle can be set to alter the relative lengths of sub-bridle lines in order to set the attitude of the kite so that the kite flies at a certain position of the potential positions; this can be done for one setting while the kite is readied for flight; but Kenneth C. Howard invited a device that can be operated on single-line kites during the flight session for variable settings:

This may be done by rapidly and repeatedly slackening the string 19. In the first described form of the invention the resulting tilting movement of the control arm 14, and the action of the pawl 22 on the teeth II, causes 15 the arm to progressively rotate around the plate 10. Thus, any desired rotated position of the arm 14 may be attained for making the kite 29 climb, dive, or fly to the right or left.

—

=== Fighter-kite control systems ===
The traditional fighter kiting with single-line control dominates kite fighting while multi-line kite fighting is yet a minor activity. The human operator of the single line aims to master movements (tugs, jerks, releases, directional movements) in order to have the unstable kite temporarily move in one direction or another. The intents of the controls are offensive and defensive; escape from an attack or position for an attack. The building of the kite so that motions by the kite's human operator or pilot allow a temporary limited stability takes special care.

== Historical kite control systems ==
Wing warping
A quad-line two-handled kite control system to warp the wing shape used by the Wright brothers and other aviation pioneers. The brothers asserted the control system as their own invention, although several contemporaries claimed prior art including European patents issued in 1868 (before the brothers were born), culminating in a series of lawsuits was called the Wright brothers patent war.
This control system is quite similar to the quad line sport kites used today.
George A. Spratt triangle control frame

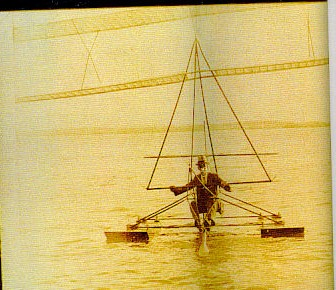
Dr. George A. Spratt towed his hang glider on floats using a motorboat demonstrating cable-stayed triangle control frame (TCF) or A-frame for use in pilot-pendulumed weight-shift control of hang gliders, trikes, ultralights. United States, 1929.

Triangle control frame for any towed or free-flight kite system.
Paresev

A mass-shifting via pulley-routed cables from a control stick while kite pilot hung from the kite from a single tensional point.
Blue-Hill Observatory

A piano-wire based kite control system.

Barry Hill Palmer
Of seven to eight experiments, Barry Hill Palmer found several control systems for his foot-launch hang glider in 1960–1962. He finally came upon what inventor George A. Spratt had already found in aviation and regarding any hang glider: a triangle control frame or A-frame in front of the pilot while the pilot hung from a tether either in a seat or harness for various positions; the mechanical arrangement precluded the later invention of the same. Many others would find the same mechanical arrangement for mass-shifting for Rogallo hang gliders and derivatives; these free-flying manned kites or hang gliders used the wing for the kites from the Fleep or Paresev or derivatives of that branch of stiffened flexible wings.

== Medium-length-tethered power kites ==
Power kites are controlled by two to five lines. The simplest systems provide steering by pulling either end of the kite. More lines can provide different functions. These are:

- adjusting the angle of attack: Pulling on lines attached to the front edge of the kite will reduce the angle of attack and thereby reduce the pull of the kite.
- braking: A line pulling the trailing edge down causes a braking effect that can be used either to make the kite turn quickly if applied to only one side, or to bring the kite down if applied symmetrically.
- distorting the kite: Useful when the kite is lying on the surface of the water. A fifth line is occasionally used to do this and thereby makes relaunching much quicker and easier.

The lines attach to different controllers:

Rings or wrist loops
These are commonly found on smaller foils.
Two-line bars
These are found on LEIs, target kites, and other recreational, and special-application kite systems. They almost always have a wrist leash attached to one of the lines so that the kite will come down if the bar is released.
Three-line bars
These are found on some foils. Lines from the ends of the bar attach to either side of the kite and the third line attaches to the rear edge of the foil. This line passes through the bar and is attached to a wrist leash via a cleat to lock the brake off until the bar is dropped. This bar design was never developed by the major manufacturers due to the complexity of the design; however an advanced model is now commercially available from K-trac.
Four-line bars
These are found on LEIs, Bows and some foils. This system provides angle-of-attack adjustment. There is usually a semi-permanent attachment, known as the chicken loop, fastened to the kiter's harness via the front lines. Releasing the bar while still attached to the chicken loop causes the kite to assume its minimum angle of attack and therefore minimizes the pull generated. There is usually a safety mechanism so that the kite can be totally depowered by detaching from the chicken loop whilst still hanging on to the kite by a leash attached to one of the lines. There are many variants on this system.
Five-line bars
These are essentially a four-line system plus a fifth line attached to either the leading edge or trailing edge of the kite. A trailing edge system causes the kite to travel to the center of the power zone and thus re-launch with a lot of power. A leading edge system is used both as a depower and a relaunch device. It can be used to lower the angle of attack for depowering. For relaunch it can be used to assist rolling the kite into the proper position.
Handles
These are commonly found on four-line foils. Each handle is a bar with a line attached at each end and each handle controls either the left or right side of the kite. They are held at the top where the power lines attach. Brake lines attach to the bottom of each bar and go to the rear edge of each side of the kite. These provide a braking function not an angle of attack function

== Control of high-altitude electricity-generating wind-power kite systems ==
Human control of high altitude wind power systems is typically accomplished through servo mechanisms, as the tether tensions are too great for direct manual operation.

There are a number of patents in this area:

- Kite control systems by John D. Bellacera
- Several patents by Dominique and Bruno Legaignoux

Other concepts include:

- Pulling the lines using winches
- Rotating the line attachment points around a central pivot.
- Shifting the line attachment points back and forth (or up and down) using linear motors

== Control of kite rigs ==
Kite rigs are systems for propelling a vehicle, such as a boat, buggy, or a vehicle with snow and ice runners. They may be as simple as a person flying a kite while standing on a specialized skateboard, or be complex systems fixed to the vehicle with powered and automated controls. They differ from conventional sails in that they are flown from lines, not supported by masts.

=== Commercial transport propulsion ===
Ship-pulling kites run to hundreds of square meters of area and require a special attachment points, a launch and recovery system, and fly-by-wire controls.

The SkySails ship propulsion system consists of a large foil kite, an electronic control system for the kite, and an automatic system to retract the kite.

The kite, while over ten times larger, bears similarities to the arc kites used in kitesurfing. However, the kite is an inflatable rather than a ram-air kite. Additionally, a control pod is used rather than direct tension on multiple kite control lines; only one line runs the full distance from kite to ship, with the bridle lines running from kite to control pod. Power to the pod is provided by cables embedded in the line; the same line also carries commands to the control pod from the ship.

The kite is launched and recovered by an animated mast or arm, which grips the kite by its leading edge. The mast also inflates and deflates the kite. When not in use, mast and deflated kite fold away.

== Target-kites ==
The term target kite generally refers to the war-time kites used for shipboard anti-aircraft gunnery practice. These were the invention of Paul E. Garber, doing war work while on leave from the Smithsonian (where he was responsible for the acquisition of much of the Air and Space collection).

The kites were ordinary two-spar Eddy style kites with a height of about five feet. The sail was sky blue with the profile of a Japanese Zero or German aircraft painted in black. Attached at the lower end of the vertical spar is a small rudder, much like a boat's rudder. The rudder is controlled by two kite lines, which are also used to fly the kite. The two lines come down to earth and terminate at an either a flying bar (a bar with spools at either end) or a special two-spool reel which incorporated a ratchet mechanism to assist in equalizing line length. The spool was in the center of a wooden bar which held the lines a fixed distance apart.

== Indoor ==
A wand or pole with a string on the end is often used to lead indoor kites around.

== Hang-gliders ==
=== Unpowered short-tethered hang-gliders ===
Unlike the long-lined power kites used in extreme kiting sport, the focus in this section is the short-lined framed large kite. The kite line or "hang line" for best controlling the flight of the hang glider kite needs to be carefully lengthened; then the line frequently splits to two, three, or four main tethers that connect to the hung kite operator's or pilot's harness. Mike Meier, kite glider author, wrote How To Get The Right Hang Height. NASA used mass-shifting in the Paresev hung-pilot aircraft with a stiffened-frame kite. The hang tether was also stiffened, differently. In sport hang gliding kite systems using the short hang line, the hang loop or first section of the hanging kite line is a flexible webbing, then the main lines to the harness are cords and sometimes webbing that are flexible. Control of the attitude of the kite's wing is achieved frequently by the pilot's grabbing the kite's stiffened airframe part called the control frame and pushing or pulling the kite's airframe left or right or forward and aft in various combinations; this control system is most commonly called "weight-shifting" although mechanically the situation is altering positions of mass to alter the center of gravity of the entire system relative to the aerodynamic center of pressure in order to effect leveraging moments to control the flight.

The place on the kite airframe where the tether is tied is very important as in all kites; such connection or bridling takes into consideration the aerodynamic center of pressure and the system's center of gravity. A key article by Mike Meier, Pitch Stability & Center of Mass Location, focuses on this concern of control.

While flying the kite hang glider, there are times during flight instruction that instructors will have the student fully release from holding the triangle control frame, and simply hang. The hanging (gravity pulls the student's body downwards and results in a tensional tugging of the kite's wing) student experiences that the properly bridled and trimmed wing will fly stably. The student experiences that the letting go of the control frame will let a properly trim stable flight. However, since gusts occur, the student learns that hands-off flying is not the normal status—rather the kite pilot is almost always handling the control frame.

=== Powered short-tethered hang-gliders ===
Here the unpowered kite is tethered to a pilot who arranges to have a harness to which is attached a thrusting prime moving engine or motor; the total system is a powered aircraft while the kite itself remains unpowered (very differently is when an engine is mounted on a wing). The control system includes the control system of the similar system where the pilot is not thrust by a harnessed prime moving engine or motor; however, in controlling flight, adjustments for center of mass are respected. Further, while the pilot's thrust is on, the pilot positions so that the kite's kite line is angled so tugging of the wing is accomplished in the familiar kiting manner where the kite line begins upwind and angles upward downwind (relative wind is to be the wind in attention here).

=== Under tow by airplane ===
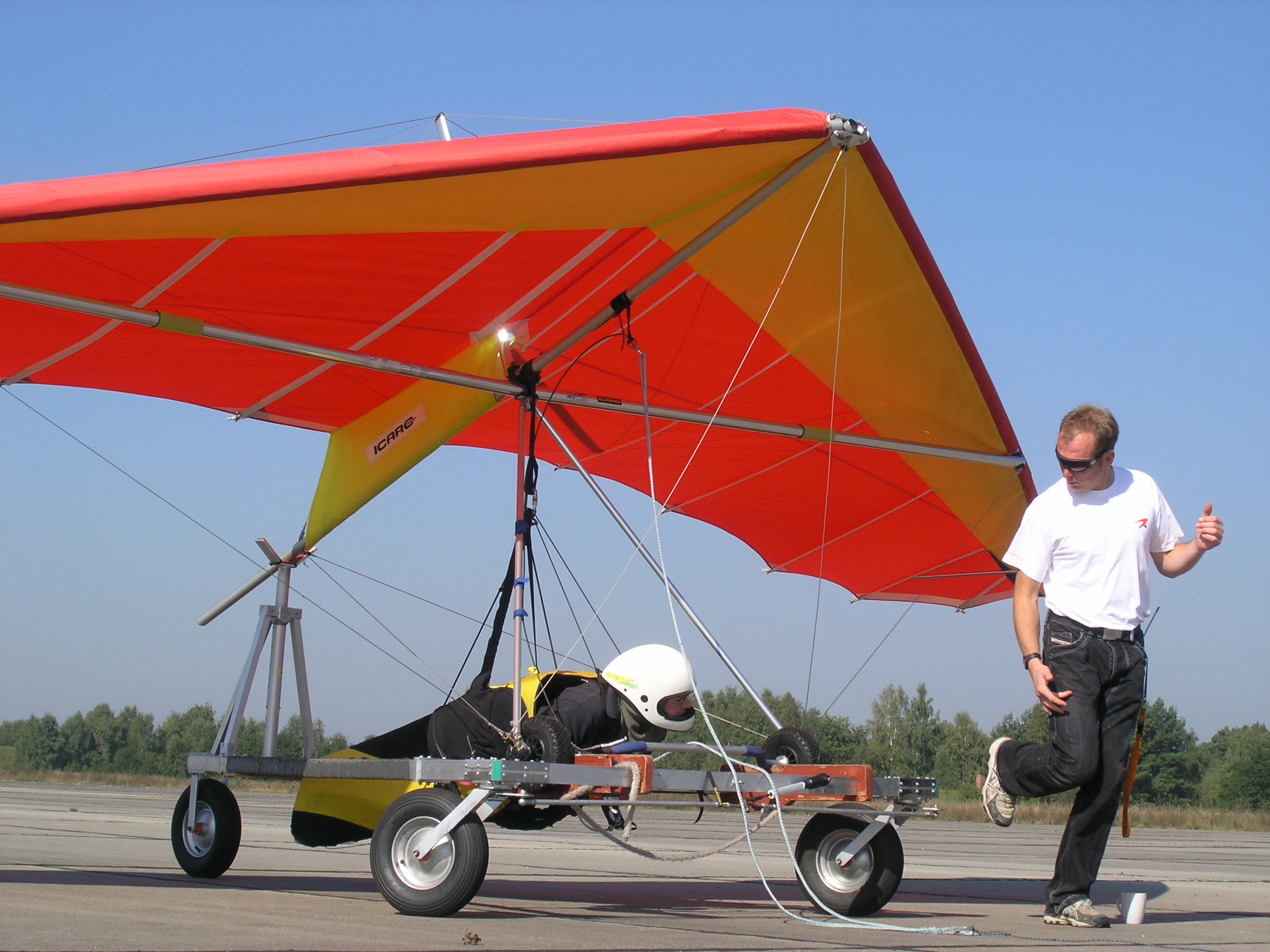
The kite hang glider is readying for being a kite in two ways; during kiting tug by the ultralight powered hang glider trike the system is a long-line kite being towed; then upon release from tug, the kite hang glider is a short-kite-lined free-flight kite with a dominant aim of gliding.

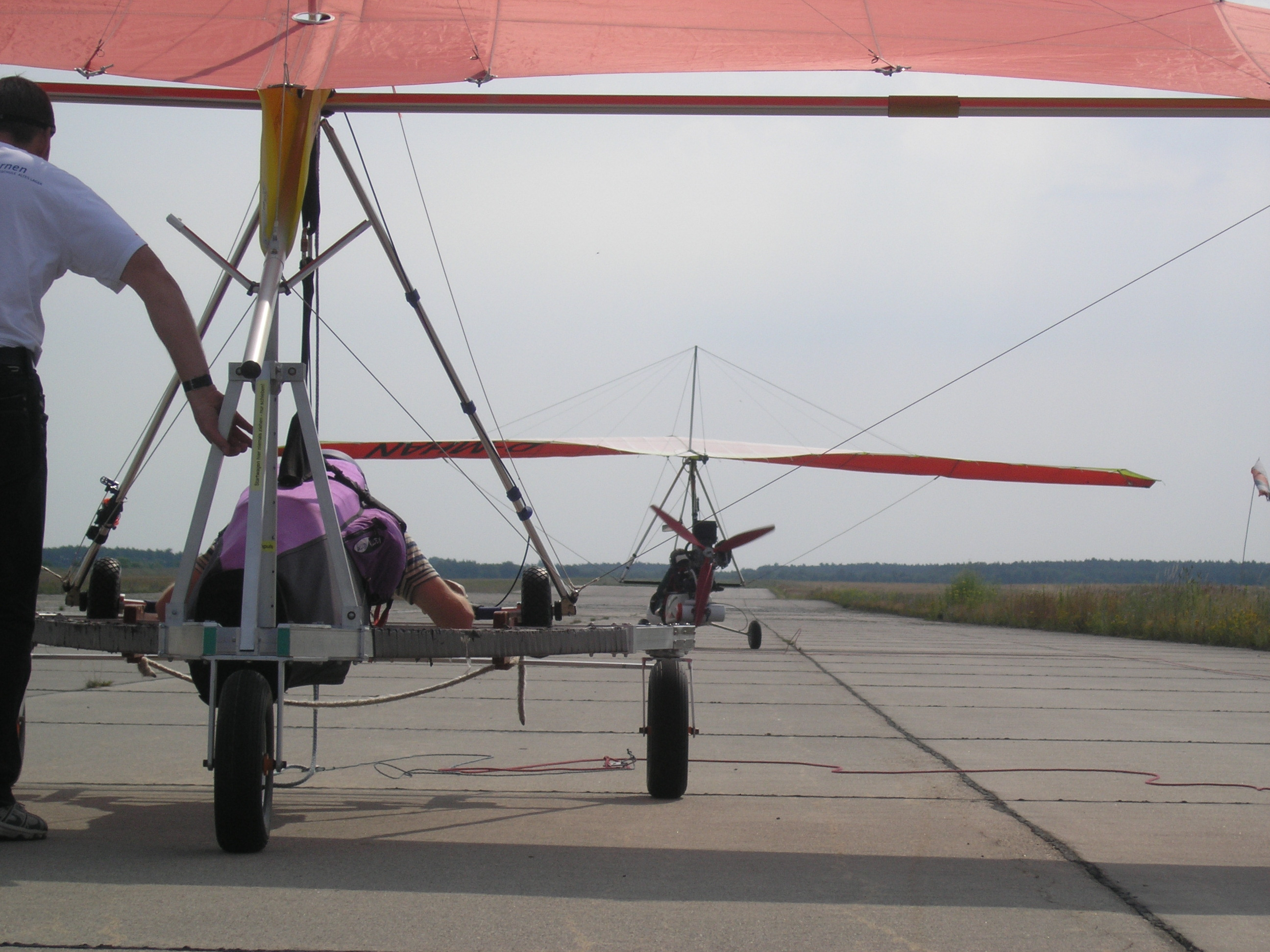
Complex control: The kited hang glider pilot is the main decision maker; the ultralight tug pilot has control duties. Hang glider on a runway, ready to start by UL-tow. The kite hang glider is sitting in a three-wheeled trolley while the trike is starting its engine.

=== Under static-line tow ===
Here the tug kite line stays the same length during the kiting operation. The ground vehicle driver has special control duties. The kited hang glider person controls the kite in some ways different from other tow methods; careful distinctions are learned in professional instruction. Controlling things when unexpected events occur is a large part of instruction.

=== Under non-static-line tow ===
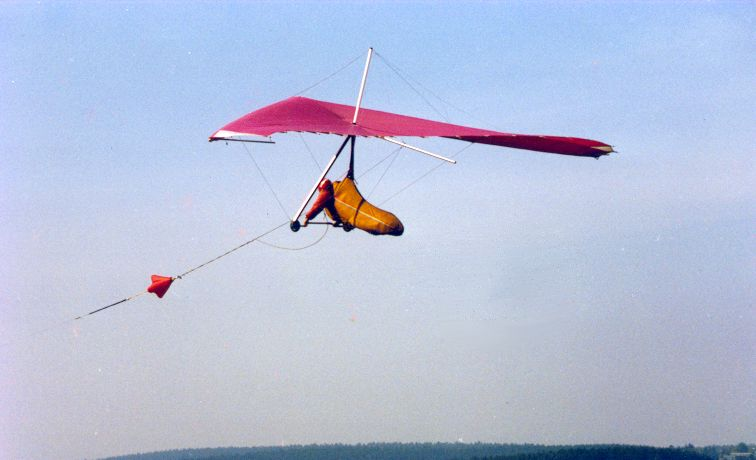
Hang glider tow with stationary winch in 1987; pilot: Manfred Laudahn in Clausthal-Zellerfeld, Germany. The red item on the long kite line is a line parachute that will soften the fall of the released kite line. After release, the human will hang from a short hang line only to tug the kite hang glider wing; he then moves the triangle control frame to control the attitudes of the kite's wing. The fall of the pilot's mass provides the tension to fly the wing.

The complex control system includes the operator of the winch. The length of line starts long and then gets shorter as the winch reels the tug line; this alters the control decisions by the kited hang glider pilot. Instruction for controls is available for new winch operators and hang glider pilots who want to be so kited. Distinguish this method from static-line (tug line stays same length during the tow). The control system for the shortening-the-tug-line method of kiting is different.

=== Under bungee-line launch ===
Bungee launch control systems for kited hang gliders has its own special details. The tug kite line is very elastic; when tensed, the line is long; during use for launch, the kite line shortens. Controlling the kite's wing attitudes is up to the pilot who frequently is hung from a short kite line while controlling a triangle control frame or other airframe part or even aerodynamic surface controls. Professional instruction is highly recommended. Inelastic portion of the bungee assembly is used to help guard against what can happen if the bungee breaks and snaps back toward the pilot; a tug-line parachute can be used to lower the speed that the released bungee will fall. Bungee launch is used most frequently for launch off slopes when free-foot-launch is not easy (site structure or pilots who have not the use of their legs), or for flatland short-flight demonstrations.

== Paragliders ==
The non-stiffened Francis Rogallo parawing, the Domina Jalbert founded parafoil wing, or other modified fully flexible wings (Barish sailwing, KiteShip wing, parasails, modified conical parachutes) do not lend themselves to a mounting of a prime moving engine or motor to them; rather the kiting lines to the unpowered wing terminate below the wing to a static or mobile anchoring; that anchoring itself may be with its own active thrusting engine or motor or the anchor (which could be payload, pilot, or both payload and pilot) may simply fall by gravity force—and thus by gravity tug the wing through the kite lines. When the payload or pilot is simply falling without adding a prime moving engine or motor, then the kited flexible wing is a paragliding wing; when the payload or pilot is additionally arranged with a thrust engine or motor, then the kited unpowered flexible wing with such thrust payload or pilot is a powered aircraft system or powered paragliding system. The control systems are varied for particular applications (ranging from lowering military payloads, autonomous powered paragliders or drones, sport paragliding, sport powered paragliding, scale-model paragliding, scale-model powered paragliding). All variations have in common the unpowered kite whether or not the payload and/or pilot is powered.

== Governable gliding parachutes ==
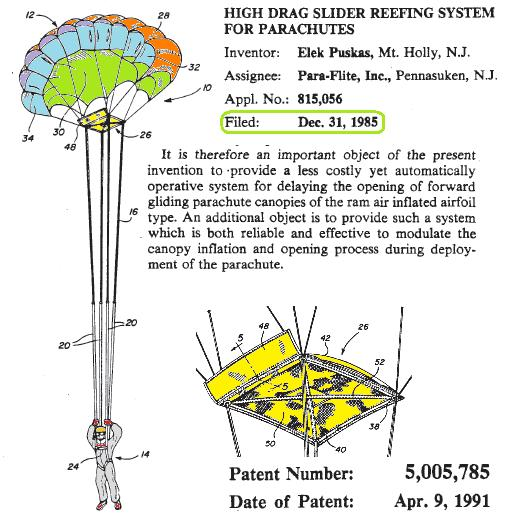
Slowing opening and reducing opening shock with a slider.

These free-flight kites are governable parachutes and are used as payload delivery systems, sport gliding parachuting or skydiving, BASE jumping, scale-model parachuting. When used for delivery of sensitive payloads or carrying humans, the fast opening from packed format is damped by use of a slider. The wing remains unpowered and kited by bridle tethering lines; the lines attach to platforms or harnesses. The size and design of the kited wing is customized for the final type of use where packing, opening, and sink rate are important feature. Control systems are specialized for the specific use. Control systems sometimes include radio control from remote locations.

== Kite aerial photography ==
Kites used in kite aerial photography (KAP) are typically controlled using the same reels and spools as non-KAP kite flyers. The best KAP work seems be done at lower altitudes than expected (100–200'), so no special equipment is required. The most problematic KAP flights are when the best camera shot requires the kite to be flown amongst tall trees or buildings, so quick haul-in can be a plus.

The camera rig itself is attached to the kite line some distance beneath the kite, preferably with a pulley scheme that will permit the camera to float in a level attitude regardless of the kite's gyrations. The Picavet system is one such scheme.

Further sophistication in kite photography comes with live video and radio control features to control where the camera is pointing. This is superior to the minimal rig which simply clicks the camera every few minutes and must be hauled down to earth to change the direction in which the camera points. The penalty of the radio control rigs is weight, which requires higher winds to do photography. So in addition to clear skies, high winds are also necessary, which will limit opportunities for photography.

== Solar sail and plasma kites ==
Scientists on one type of solar kite take pride that there will be a minimum of moving parts to control the movement of the solar kite through space and around the Earth, Moon, comet, or other Solar System body. A collection of scientists and engineers are expanding the definition of what a kite is; the solar kite described by authors C. Jack and C. Welch has the inertia of the mass of the kite providing resistance against photonic flow. Also, the controlling of the kite to alter the kite's acceleration sets up a kiting scenario: causing the kite to deflect away from the pull of gravity to keep it flying on its intended path supports the inclusion of the solar sail as a kite in photonic flow. The kite is fed start data; the kite tracks the stars and operates three elements to control its attitude to effect its deflections to result in the flight path desired by the ground-directing kite operators. The position of the payload is changed to alter the relative positions of the kite's center of pressure and center of mass; this is done in part by piezoelectric actuators. Also, the struts that hold the centered payload are differentially heated; such causes one of the struts to become longer than the cooler struts and thereby changing the center of mass relative to the center of pressure of the kite. Further, to cause an attitude change, tiny photo thrusters (heated wire) tweak the attitude of the kite; such thrusters do not propel the kite, but are only used to change the attitude of the kite's sail. These mechanisms aim to give authoritative control at minimum power use for giving direction to the kite. Working solar kite groups are considering at least seventeen means of control of the solar kite/solar sail.

== Patents ==
- US Patent 2613894
- US Patent 4280675 Controllable kite Lynn M. Davis et al.
- US Pat. 3138356 KITE CONTROL Raymond L. Mcclain
- US Pat. 2556877 KITE CONTROL Kenneth C. Howard
- US Pat. 2613894 KITE CONTROL Howard
- US Pat. 4129273 Kite control mechanism Donald R. Hill
- US Pat. 3355129 KITE CONTROL ASSEMBLY E. V. KINSEY

== See also ==
- Aircraft flight control system
- Barrage balloon
- Flight control surfaces
- Man-lifting kite
- Paravane (water kite)
- Speed sailing
- Windsport
