= Kite (disambiguation) =

A kite is a tethered heavier-than-air or lighter-than-air craft with wing surfaces.

Kite or kites may also refer to:

- Kite (bird), the common name for a number of birds of prey
- Kite (geometry), a quadrilateral with reflection symmetry across a diagonal

== Arts and entertainment ==
=== Fictional characters ===
- Kite (.hack), from the video game series
- Kite, a Hunter × Hunter character
- Kite, in the TV series Extraterrestrial
- Mr. Kite, a character on the American comedy children's television series Pee-wee's Playhouse

=== Film and television ===
- Kite (film series), by Yasuomi Umetsu
  - Kite (1998 film), an original video animation
  - Kite (2014 film), a live action film
- The Kite (2003 film), a Lebanese drama
- Saranggola, or The Kite, a 1999 Filipino film
- Kites (film), a 2010 Indian romantic action thriller
- Patang (1993 film) ('The Kite'), an Indian film
- "Kite" (Balamory), a 2002 television episode
- "The Kite" (Shaun the Sheep), a 2007 television episode

=== Literature ===
- Kite (novel) by Melvin Burgess, 1997
- The Kite, a 1962 novel by W. O. Mitchell
- Les Cerfs-volants, a 1980 novel by Romain Gary, translated as The Kites (2017)

=== Music ===
- Kite (band), a Swedish synthpop duo
- "Kite" (Arashi song), 2020
- "Kite" (Kate Bush song), 1978
- "Kite" (Benjamin Ingrosso song), 2024
- "Saranggola (Ben&Ben song)" or Kite, 2025
- Kite (Kirsty MacColl album), 1989
- Kite (Stefanie Sun album), 2001
- "Kite" (U2 song), 2000
- "Kite", a song by Nick Heyward from the 1993 album From Monday to Sunday
- "Kites" (song), by Simon Dupree, 1967
- "Kites", a song by Reks from the 2016 album The Greatest X
- "Kite Song", a song by Kevin Roth from "Faith, Hope and Anxiety", an episode of Shining Time Station

== Ships ==
- HMS Kite, the name of several ships of the Royal Navy
- SS Kite, a ship used in the Peary expedition to Greenland of 1891–1892
- USS Kite, the name of several ships of the U.S. Navy

== Other uses ==
- Kite (sail), or spinnaker
- Kite (sailboat), an American sailboat design
- Kite (surname), including a list of people with the name
- Kite, Georgia, U.S., a place
- Kite, Kentucky, U.S., a place
- Kite, any aircraft, in RAF slang
- Kite and dart tiling, in geometry
- KITE (AM), a radio station (1410 AM) licensed to Victoria, Texas, U.S.
- KITE (Kansas City), a radio station licensed to Kansas City, Missouri, which held the call sign KITE from 1938 until 1942
- KNAL (FM), a radio station in Texas (93.3 FM) licensed to Port Lavaca, U.S., call sign KITE 2001–2014
- KiTE, KGiSL Institute of Technology in Coimbatore, India
- KITE Kerala, Kerala Infrastructure and Technology for Education, an Indian education company
- Kite Pharma, an American biotechnology company
- Alpi Pioneer 300 Kite, an Italian light-sport aircraft design
- Wright GB Kite, an electric single-decker bus

== See also ==
- Index of kite articles
- Kiting (disambiguation)
- Kiteboarding, a sport using wind power with a large power kite
- Desert kite, a dry stone wall structure
- Kite shield a type of shield
