= Arc kite =

Type of traction kite

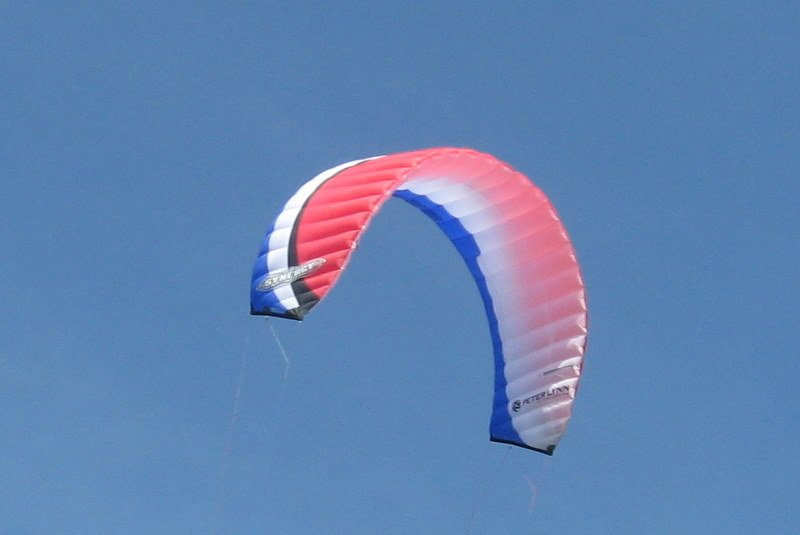
An arckite

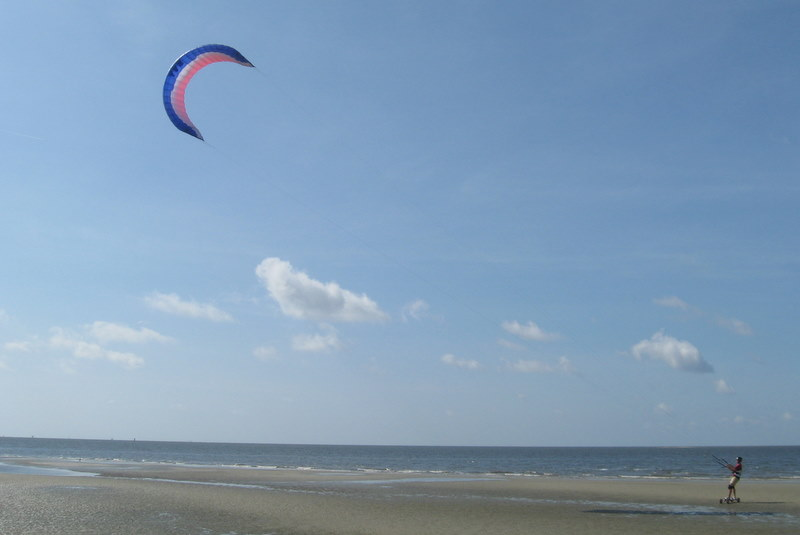
Using an arckite with a landboard

The arckite or twinskin kite is a type of traction kite designed and patented by Peter Lynn. It is a very stable, safe and secure type of powerkite. It can be used for all kinds of kite powered sports, for example: kiteboarding, landboarding, kite buggying or snowkiting. The shape of the kite is similar to a C-shaped leading edge inflatable kite, however the construction is similar to a foil kite. These kites also fall into a category of foils called "closed-cell inflatables", meaning that the ram-air inlets on the leading edge of the kite are normally closed by flaps that act as one-way valves to maintain internal air pressure. It is this feature that makes the kite useful for kitesurfing since, unlike standard open-cell foils, if the kite crashes on the water, it will stay inflated and float long enough for the rider to recover and re-launch.

== History ==
- 1999-2000 S-Arc
- 2002 F-Arc
- 2003 Guerilla & Phantom
- 2004 Bomba & Guerilla II
- 2005 Venom
- 2006 Venom II & Vortex
- 2007 Scorpion
- 2008 Synergy
- 2009 Charger
- 2012 Phantom II
- 2013 Charger 2013

== Styles ==
Depending on the specific style of the kite its suitable better for different usages, however, each of the kites can be used on all terrain.

=== Land based kites (highest aspect ratio) ===
Kites which are not as easy to water relaunch, but have better depower and upper wind range.

- Phantom
- Scorpion
- Phantom II

=== Water based low aspect ratio ===
- S-Arc
- Bomba
- Vortex

=== Water based high aspect ratio ===
Better low wind performance,

- F-Arc
- Guerila I & Guerilla II
- Venom I & Venom II
- Synergy
- Charger
