= Kiting =

Kiting may refer to:

- Flying a kite
- Check kiting, a form of banking fraud
- Domain kiting, a practice in domain name registration
- Kiting, a video game term
- Kiting, or ballooning, a process by which spiders move through the air

== See also ==
- Kite (disambiguation)
- Index of kite articles
- Kiteboarding, a water sport
