= Rigid kite =

Rigid kite may refer to:

- Rigid kite (airborne wind energy), aircraft-like wing that is flown autonomously to harvest wind energy
- Rigid-framed power kite, one of the power kites which consists of a single skin and a rigid frame
- Rotor kite, an unpowered rotary wing aircraft or kite
