= Power kite =

Large kite designed to provide significant pull to the user

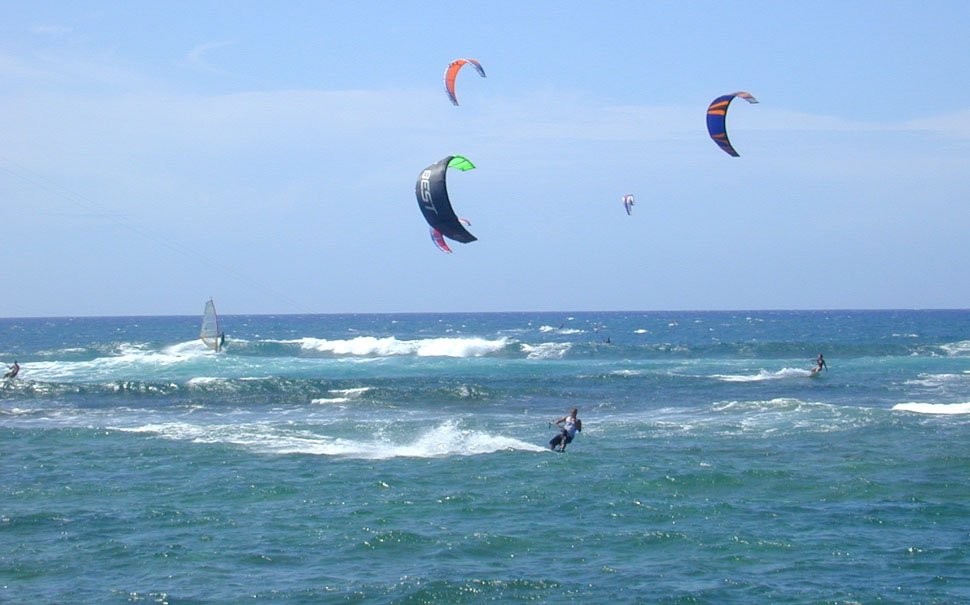
Kitesurfing in strong onshore winds off the north shore of Oʻahu in Hawaii.

A power kite or traction kite is a large kite designed to provide significant pull to the user.

== Types ==
The two most common forms are the foil, and the leading edge inflatable. There are also other less common types of power kite including rigid-framed kites and soft single skin kites. There are several different control systems used with these kites which have two to five lines and a bar or handles.

Foil kites consist of a number of cells with cloth ribs in each cell. It is the profile of these ribs that gives the kite its aerofoil shape and enable it to generate lift. The most common type is the ram-air foil, where each cell has a gauze-covered opening at the front, meaning air is forced in during flight, giving the kite its stiffness and enabling it to hold its profile. Some ram-air foils are closed-cell, where a one-way valve locks the air inside the cells, giving some increased water relaunch capability.

Leading edge inflatable kites (LEIs) are made of a single skin of fabric with, as the name suggests, an inflated tubular leading edge and inflated ribs. The leading edge and ribs are inflated by the user with a pump prior to launching the kite. The profile of an LEI type kite comes from the inflatable edge and ribs. LEI kites are primarily used for kitesurfing, as they retain their structure when wet and can be easily relaunched from the water after sitting on the surface for an extended period. Conversely, an open-celled foil kite crashed into the sea immediately becomes saturated with water and unflyable.

== Uses ==
Power kites are generally used in conjunction with a vehicle or board, such as in:

- kitesurfing on a kiteboard
- kite buggying on a purpose-built 3-wheeled cart
- kite landboarding on an all-terrain/mountain/land board
- kite skating on all-terrain roller skates
- kiteboating, on a boat
- snowkiting on skis or snowboards

Power kites can also be used recreationally without a vehicle or board, as in kite jumping or kite man lifting, where a harnessed kite flier is moored to the ground or one or more people to provide tension and lift

Research is also under way in the use of kites to generate electric power to be fed into a power grid. Laddermills are a type of airborne wind turbine. As an alternative to fuel-powered generators, shipping container sized generators can provide electricity to remote locations using large computer-controlled foil kites and battery reserves. Kites are used to reach high altitude winds such as a jet stream, which are always present, even if ground level winds available to wind turbines are absent.

Kites of related design are used for sailing, including speed sailing. Jacob's Ladder, a kite-powered boat, set the C-Class world sailing speed record with a speed of 25 knots (46 km/h) in 1982, a record that stood for six years. A kiteboard was the first sailing craft to exceed a speed of 50 knots (93 km/h) in October 2008.

Power kites range in size from 1.2 to 50 m^{2} (13 to 538 ft^{2}). All kites are made for specific purposes: some for water, land, power or maneuverability.

== Bridle configuration ==
The lift generated by the kite and other flying characteristics are affected by the kite's angle of attack, which is set by the bridle; the arrangement of lines which terminate the main kite lines and attach to a number of points across the kite's surface. Power kites having 4 or 5 lines come in two variants, fixed bridle and depowerable.

=== Fixed bridle ===
Fixed bridle kites have a fixed angle of attack which is set by the bridle. Small adjustments may be possible by adjusting the bridle with the kite on the ground, however the angle of attack is not adjustable whilst the kite is airborne. A high angle of attack setting results in more power from the kite, but at the expense of speed and ability to fly close to the wind. A low angle of attack results in less power, but speed is increased and the kite can fly a lot closer to the edge of the wind window. Fixed bridle kites may be used with handles or a bar, with handles typically being preferable for activities such as kite jumping and kite buggying, and a bar being preferable for kite landboarding.

=== Depowerable ===
Depowerable kites are used with a control bar and harness system, with the kite's primary power lines attached to the user's harness through a hole in the centre of the bar. The bar has a few inches of travel along the lines, and the lines are configured such that the user may pull the bar towards themselves to increase the kite's angle of attack, increasing the lift and thus the power delivered through the harness whilst the kite is in flight. Kites used for kitesurfing are almost invariably depowerable, and some modern kites such as bow kites allow power to be reduced by almost 100% for increased safety and versatility.

Illustration of LEI (R), bow (L) and foil (T) power kites

Power kite video

== Safety ==
Kite safety systems have become more prevalent in recent years, and today almost all 4 and 5 line kites are used with a safety system designed to remove power from the kite in the event that the user becomes overpowered or loses control of the kite. When flying a fixed bridle kite, one or more straps known as 'kite killers' are attached to the user's wrist(s) by bungee cords. When the handles or bar are released, these straps pull on the kite's brake lines at the trailing edge of the kite, allowing the kite to flap in the wind with no structure.

Depowerable kites have safety systems that work in a similar way, but since the kite is semi-permanently attached to the user's harness, a toggle or handle is used to activate the safety system which releases the bar and power lines from the harness.

Some depowerable kites have a 5th line safety system, the 5th line being redundant during normal use until the safety mechanism is activated. Here, all of the usual four lines are slackened, causing the kite to either fold or roll backwards, and lose its profile to the wind and therefore its power. The kite is left attached to the user by the 5th line to allow retrieval.

== History ==
=== 19th century ===
In the 1820s, George Pocock used kites of increased size to propel carts on land and ships on the water, using a four-line control system—the same system in common use today. Both carts and boats were able to turn and sail upwind. The kites could be flown for sustained periods. The intention was to establish kitepower as an alternative to horsepower, partly to avoid the hated "horse tax" that was levied at that time. Aviation pioneer Samuel Cody developed several "man-lifting kites" and in 1903 succeeded in crossing the English Channel in a small collapsible canvas boat powered by a kite.

=== 20th century ===
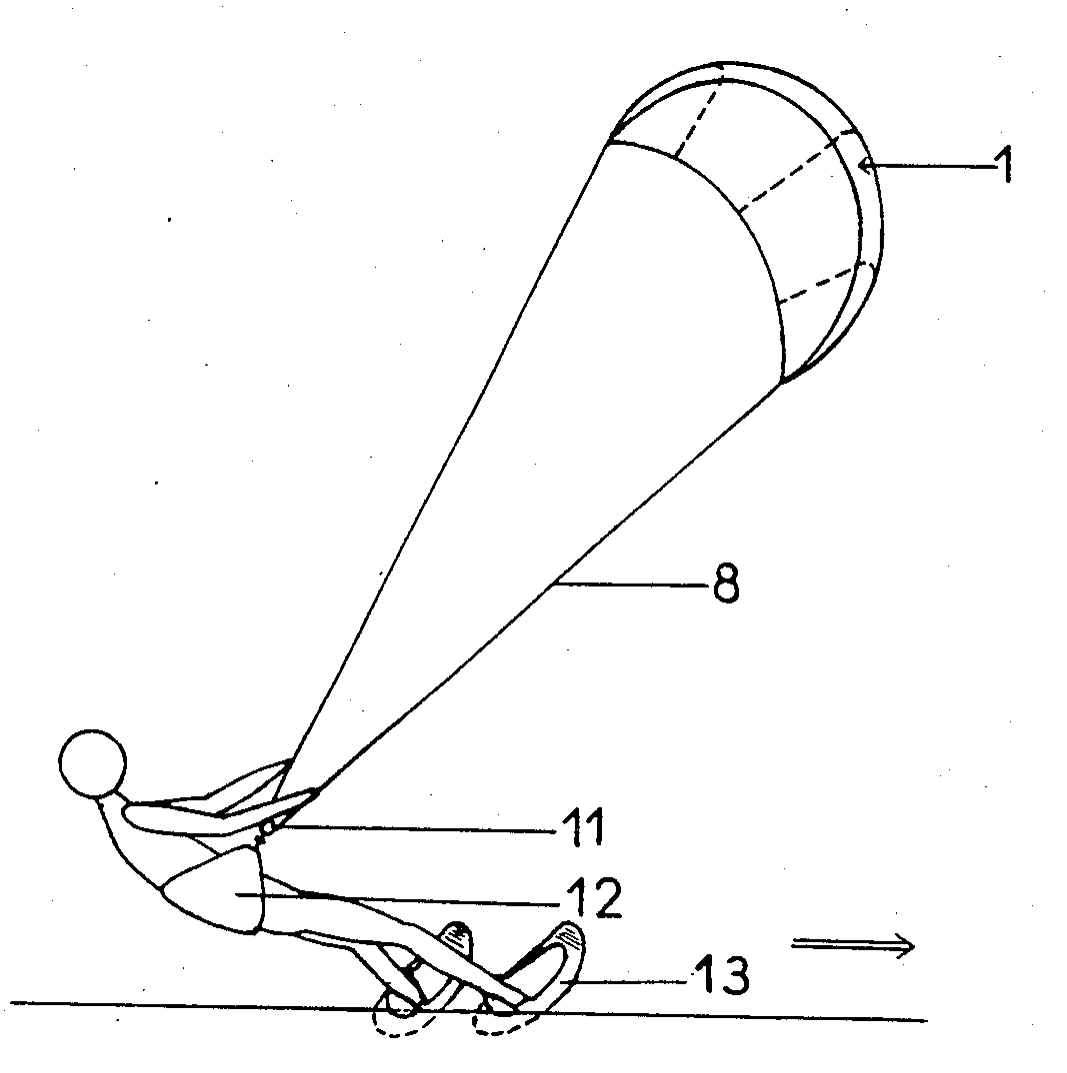
1984 patent of the Legaignoux brothers

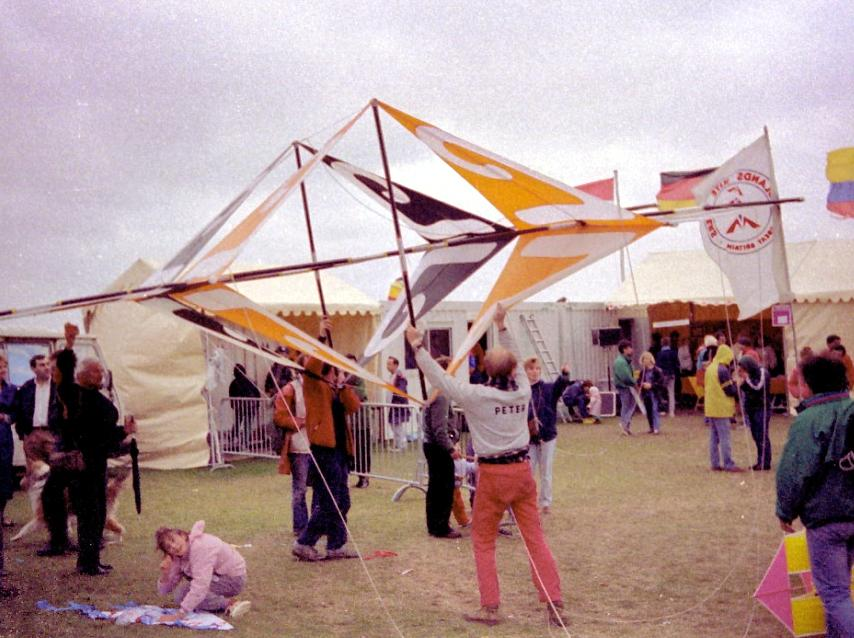
Peter Lynn lifting a kite in Dieppe, September 1988

In the late 1970s, the development of Kevlar then Spectra flying lines and more controllable kites with improved efficiency contributed to practical kite traction. In 1978, Ian Day's "FlexiFoil" kite-powered Tornado catamaran exceeded 40 km/h.

On 11 October 1977 Gijsbertus Adrianus Panhuise (Netherlands) received the first patent for KiteSurfing. The patent covers, specifically, a water sport using a floating board of a surf board type where a pilot standing up on it is pulled by a wind catching device of a parachute type tied to his harness on a trapeze type belt. Although this patent did not result in any commercial interest, Gijsbertus Adrianus Panhuise could be considered as the originator of KiteSurfing.

On 28 August 1982 Greg Locke and Simon Carter, from Brighton UK, set the world record for kite traction at sea, travelling nearly 26 miles under wind power alone along the English channel. This followed a successful crossing of the English Channel from Sussex to France by Locke & Carter the previous year.

Through the 1980s, there were occasionally successful attempts to combine kites with canoes, ice skates, snow skis, water skis and roller skates.

Throughout the 1970s and early 1980s, Dieter Strasilla from Germany developed parachute-skiing and later perfected a kite-skiing system using self-made paragliders and a ball-socket swivel allowing the pilot to sail upwind and uphill but also to take off into the air at will. Strasilla and his Swiss friend Andrea Kuhn used this invention also in combination with surfboards and snowboards, grasskies and self-made buggies. One of his patents describes in 1979 the first use of an inflatable kite design for kitesurfing.

Two brothers, Bruno Legaignoux and Dominique Legaignoux, from the Atlantic coast of France, developed kites for kitesurfing in the late 1970s and early 1980s and patented an inflatable kite design in November 1984, a design that has been used by companies to develop their own products.

In 1990, practical kite buggying was pioneered by Peter Lynn at Argyle Park in Ashburton, New Zealand. Lynn coupled a three-wheeled buggy with a forerunner of the modern parafoil kite. Kite buggying proved to be popular worldwide, with over 14,000 buggies sold up to 1999.

== See also ==
- Kite types
- Kite applications
- Kite mooring
- Rigid kite
- SkySails - industrial-scale power kites for pulling ships
