= George Pocock (inventor) =

British schoolteacher and inventor

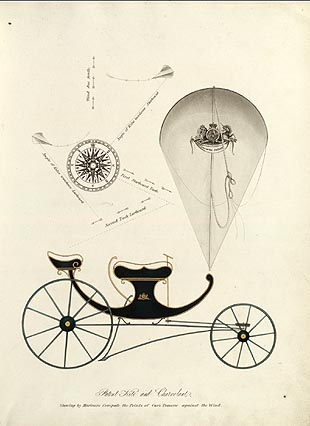
The Charvolant - a kite-drawn buggy

George Pocock (1774–1843) was an English schoolteacher, the founder of Tent Methodism and an inventor, particularly known for having invented the 'Charvolant,' a kite-drawn carriage.

George was born in Hungerford in Berkshire in 1774, the son of John Pocock, a cabinet-maker in that town, and his wife, Mary. In adulthood, he moved to Bristol where he became a schoolteacher. Pocock was interested in kites from an early age, and experimented with pulling loads using kite power, gradually progressing from small stones to planks and large loads. He taught at a school in Prospect Place, Bristol and continued his experiments with his pupils. By 1820 he had determined that in combination they could support considerable weight and began experimenting with man-lifting kites. In 1824, he used a 30-foot (9 m) kite with a chair rig to lift his daughter, Martha (the future mother of cricketer W.G. Grace) over 270 feet (82 m) into the air. Later the same year and continuing to use his family as subjects, he lifted his son to the top of a cliff outside Bristol; his son briefly dismounted from the chair at the top of the 200-foot (60 m) cliff and then concluded the test by releasing a clip on the kite line which allowed him to slide down the line in the chair and return to earth.

Having concluded that kites were capable of lifting humans, he turned again to experimenting with them as a way of pulling loads, this time as a method of pulling vehicles. Using kites in various arrangements he determined that a small number of large kites were capable of pulling a carriage with passengers.

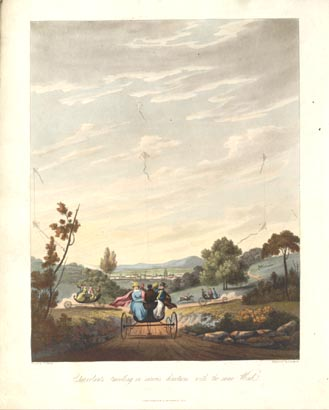
Charvolants travelling in various directions with the same Wind (1827), a romanticised view of mass transportation by Charvolant.

In 1826, he patented the design of his "Charvolant" buggy. This used two kites on single line 1,500 to 1,800 feet (457–459 m) long to provide enough power to draw along a buggy carrying several passengers at considerable speed, similar to the modern sport of kite buggying. In his book, The Aeropleustic Art or Navigation in the Air by the use of Kites, or Buoyant Sails, Pocock records that it performed at the rate of 20 miles an hour (32 km/h) over considerable distances and that a mile could frequently be covered even over heavy roads in 2¾ minutes. A group of three Charvolants made a trip of 113 miles (182 km) together, and on a run between Bristol and Marlborough one of the buggies sailed past the mail coach, which at the time was the fastest passenger transport. On another trip, a Charvolant passed the coach of the Duke of Gloucester, a breach of etiquette that was considered so rude that the occupants had to stop to let the Duke pass them.

Four control lines to the kite provided a method of steering; these lines were paid out or drawn in from large spools mounted on the front of the carriage. Large wheels allowed the carriage to utilise the power from the kites effectively. In addition to controlling the kites, the driver had to steer the carriage by means of a T-bar which controlled the direction of the front wheels, and was responsible for the brake, an iron bar mounted on the carriage which dug into the road when the lever was pulled. Controlling the Charvolant was difficult, and this may have been why it never became successful commercially, even though it escaped the tolls levied on the roads for horse-drawn carriages: tolls were applied according to the number of horses and since the Charvolant had none it incurred no charge.

Pocock advocated other uses for kites in his book, including auxiliary sail power for ships (similar to modern traction kites), a means of dropping anchor and effecting rescues from shipwrecks. He also used his book to advertise other of his inventions, including a celestial globe for viewing the stars that a teacher and pupils could stand inside.

He died of bronchitis at his home in Bristol on 9 November 1843.
