= Snowboard binding rotating device =

Some Snowboard binding rotating devices are designed to minimize the torque force that occurs when a snowboarder has one foot out of the binding and one locked on the board. The rotating device allows the snowboarder to turn the locked foot straight into the direction of the tip of the snowboard without removing their boot from the boot binding. Like this they can push themselves forward like a skateboarder. Others are designed to be free rotating the entire time you ride. Both feet are free to turn and adjust to the optimal position for a certain terrain. These subtle changes in foot position help keep stress off of ones knees as well as help ones control down the slopes.

== Background ==
Snowboard boot bindings are normally screwed onto the snowboard in a permanent orientation which is almost perpendicular to the direction of travel of the snowboard. When a snowboarder reaches the bottom of a run, the rear boot is typically released from its binding to allow the snowboarder to propel himself forward across relatively flat snow. Because the front foot in the snowboard binding is at an angle to forward motion, the snowboarder experiences discomfort and tension on his leg, knee and foot joint.

Four to 8 percent of snowboarding injuries take place while the person is waiting in ski-lift lines or entering and exiting ski lifts. Snowboarders push themselves forward with a free foot while in the ski-lift line, leaving the other foot (usually that of the lead leg) locked on the board at a 45- to 90-degree angle, placing a large torque force on this leg and predisposing the person to knee injury if a fall occurs.

Approximately 15% of snowboarding injuries are ankle injuries, with half of those being LPT or other fractures. The mechanism of injury in “snowboarder’s fracture” is generally due to dorsiflexion of the ankle with inversion of the hind foot. This action occurs during a landing from an aerial maneuver or jump, especially when the landing is over rotated. The primary stress on the rider’s foot is due to the foot being locked rigidly to the board. There is no additional torque or force compelling the lower leg to turn counter to the upper leg and torso.

When a free rotating binding is placed between the rider’s boot binding and the board, the effect of the torque due to the landing is reduced. The predominant force on the lower leg is the torque from the upper leg and torso. Since the foot is free to rotate on the board, the leg naturally rotates in the same direction as the upper leg, and the ability of the foot to rotate accommodates this.

The two motions described leave the foot, ankle and knee in the best position to continue riding after landing, increasing the probability of a successful landing, improving overall enjoyment, and reducing risk of injury from a less-than-optimal landing.

== Techniques ==
The rotating device is usually installed between snowboard and binding or integrated into the binding. There are two primary types of rotating bindings.

The first type allows the snowboarder to rotate the snowboard boot binding in relation to the snowboard by pulling upon a tether or releasing a lock. Repeating and rotating in the opposite direction leads back to the original angle position. These bindings are mainly either for comfort in the line or for one-time adjustments at the start of a run. Except for locked-in adjustments at the start of each run, these bindings are essentially the same as regular bindings except for the ease of adjusting foot angles.

The second type of rotational binding allows freedom of movement at all times, including throughout a ride. These help remove stress from your knees while riding and allow you to adjust your foot angle to an ideal position for a specific terrain. The rider's feet naturally assume the best position and angles for the fall lines and bumps in the ride, just as when skateboarding, during or wake-surfing. This is also true in landing jumps. The rider's feet will naturally assume the best position given the rider's motion and orientation prior to landing, and will move to the best position after landing to continue the run and set up the next action. This type of binding also allows the rider to orient his or her feet comfortably while standing and moving in lift lines. On the lift itself, the board can hang vertically with the foot straight up and down, relieving all stress on the lift and reducing interference with other boards and skis.

The free-rotating bindings are becoming very popular when snowkiting due their ability to release stress and tension on ankles and knees.

== Products ==
- Broko Snowboard Bindings
- Quick Stance
- Swivler Plate & Binding
- Lumbos
