= Windsport =

Type of sport involving wind power

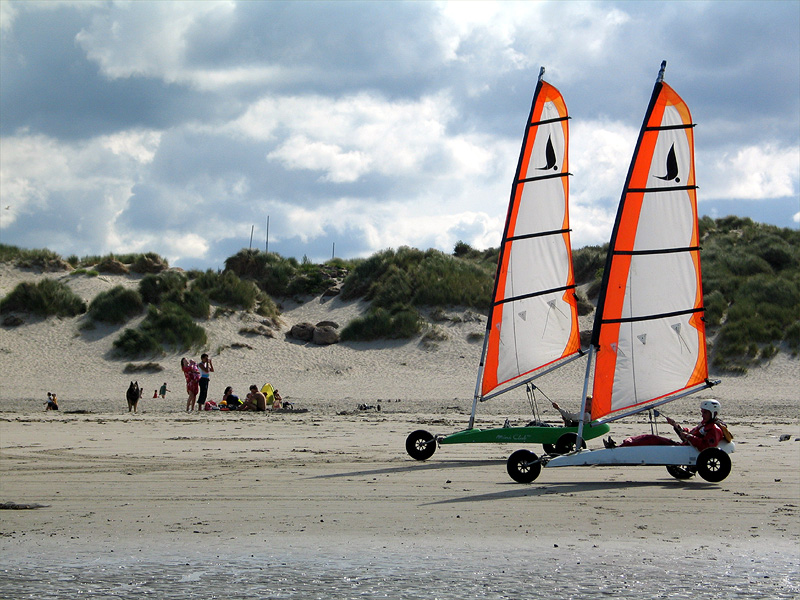
Land sailing

A windsport is any type of sport which involves wind-power, often involving a non-rigid airfoil such as a sail or a power kite.The activities can be land-based, on snow, on ice or on water. Windsport activity may be regulated in some countries by aviation/maritime authorities if they are likely to interfere with other activities. Local authorities may also regulate activity in certain areas, especially on crowded beaches and parks.

- Ice boating - using a masted sail attached to a vessel with skates
- Kite boating - sailing a boat in displacement or planing mode using a kite
- Kite landboarding - using a power kite with a wheeled board while standing
- Kite buggy - using a wheeled buggy with seats attached to a power kite
- Kite flying - flight of a small airfoil by a standing ground operator using 1-4 flying lines
- Kite skating - as for kite jumping but while using specialized skates
- Kiteboarding - using a surfboard attached to a power kite
- Land sailing - a masted sail attached to a land vehicle - see also land yacht
- Sailing - navigating a boat with sail attached to a mast
- Snowkiting - skiing/snowboarding under the power of a kite
- Windsurfing - sailing using a masted sail attached via a gimbal to a surfboard
- Wing foiling or wingsurfing is a surface watersport where a rider uses a lightweight wing on a surf board with a hydrofoil.

== Air sports ==
The following air sports are not classed as windsports because in these the participants actually leave the ground for long periods and many do not use the wind:

- Gliding - use of vertically moving air to keep an aircraft aloft
- Hang gliding - use of vertically moving air to keep aloft an aircraft with a flexible wing
- Microlighting - flying a hang glider with an engine (also see ultralight aircraft)
- Parachuting (skydiving) and base jumping - controlled descent of the operator under a large flexible canopy
- Paragliding - soaring under a parachute canopy
- Parasailing - hanging under a paraglider towed by a vehicle (boat, car, or snowmobile) in order to ascend (usually over water)
- Hot air ballooning - a balloon you ride which uses fire to go up and wind to stay afloat
- Paramotoring - a motor vehicle attached with a parachute which can hang into the air for hours and can also be used as a vehicle to cross countries or jumping to an island. It is self-controllable, and you may need the permission of the local government to fly over an area.
