= Luffing =

Nautical term

In sailing, luffing refers to when a sailing vessel is steered far enough toward the direction of the wind ("windward"), or the sheet controlling a sail is eased so far past optimal trim, that airflow over the surfaces of the sail is disrupted and the sail begins to "flap" or "luff" (the luff of the sail is usually where this first becomes evident). This is not always done in error; for example, the sails will luff when the bow of the boat passes through the direction of the wind as the sailboat is tacked.

A sailboat can also be "luffed" slightly without completely de-powering the sails. Often this occurs on the point of sail known as close hauled, this is sometimes referred to as pinching or "feathering" and is sometimes done deliberately in order to make a more direct course toward an upwind destination (see: "beating to windward"), or to "de-power" a sail on a windy day to maintain control of the sailboat. "Luffing" can also be used to slow or stop a sailboat in a controlled manner. To offset luffing at the top of the sail one should move the sail "lead" forward until the point where the "telltales" break evenly.

Luffing is also a process of power kites when they stall and the front (or leading) edge falls downwards.
