= Soft single skin kite =

Least complex of all the power kites

Soft single skin kites are the least complex of all the power kites.

The best known design is the NASA Parawing or NPW. For more, see rogallo wing. This is a very simple kite with mixed performance. It has excellent pull, but is slow to maneuver and suffers from a limited wind window. Its simple construction and forgiving design make it very popular among hobbyists and some traction enthusiasts, especially ski- and sledge-borne expeditions across both Arctic and Antarctic lands, but its drawbacks make it unsuitable for high efficiency and many water-borne sports.

There are also soft single skin kites designed to be used on sailing ships as a free flying spinnaker substitute. There are significant advantages to having the spinnaker catching wind further above the surface of the water than is normal. This design was tested in the 2002 Louis Vuitton Regatta by the Oracle America's Cup team.

== See also ==
- Kite types
