= Peter Lynn =

New Zealand kite maker (1946–2026)

- Born: Peter Robert Lynn; 1946
- Died: 11 April 2026 (aged 79); Ashburton, New Zealand
- Occupation: Kite maker
- Years active: 1973–?
- Website: www.plk.nz

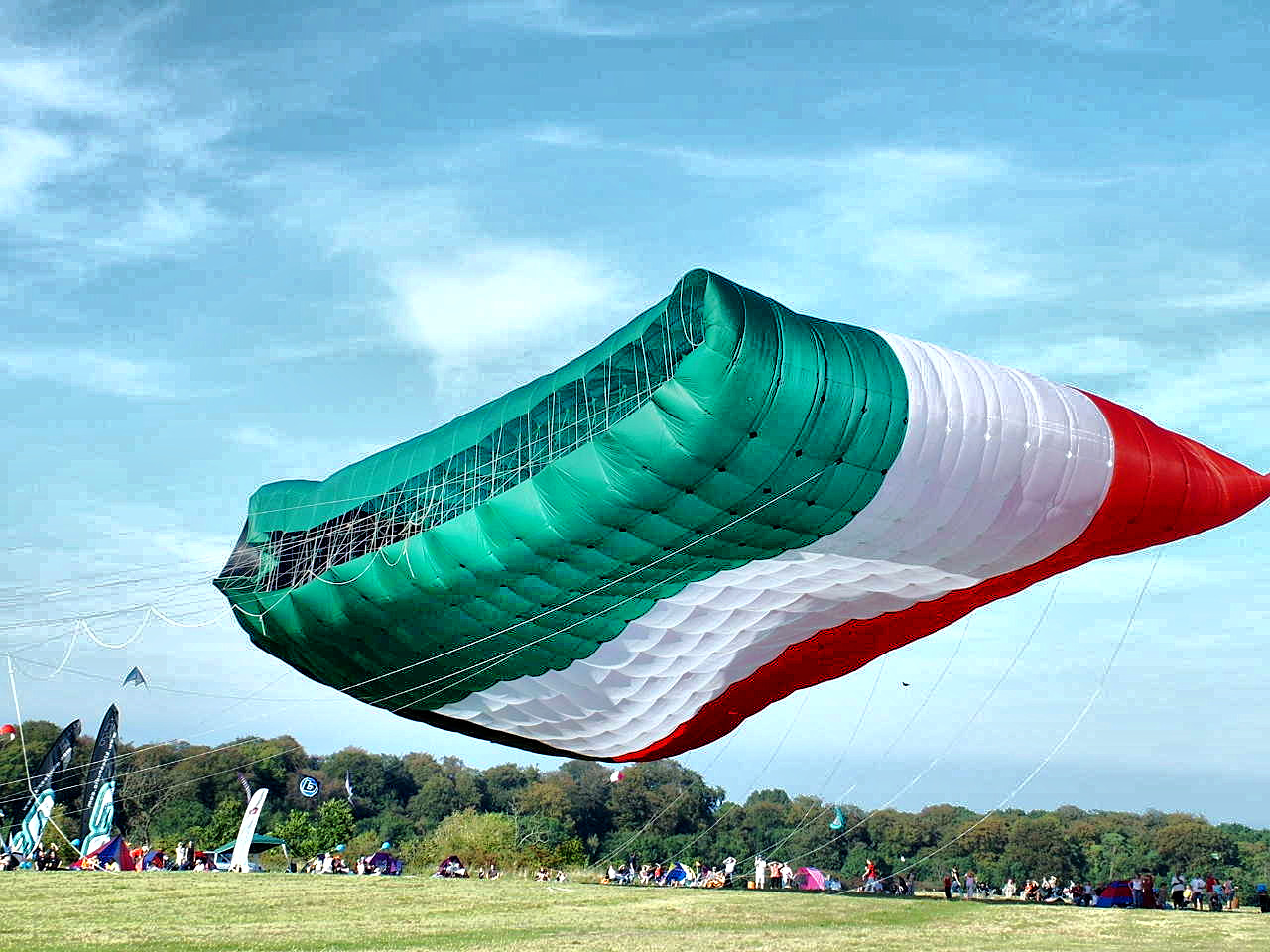
The World's Largest Kite (2005–), the Flag of Kuwait

Peter Robert Lynn (1946 – 11 April 2026) was a New Zealand kite maker, engineer and inventor. He is notable for his construction of the world's largest kites (Guinness book of records holders), giant inflatable (sparless) display kites (the most widely known is the 27-metre (89 ft) octopus kite), the popularisation of kite buggying and contributions to the development of power kiting and kitesurfing. He travelled worldwide, displaying his kites at international kite festivals.

== Kitemaking ==
Lynn, together with his wife Elwyn, established a kite business at Ashburton, New Zealand, in 1971, producing single-line kites for children. In 1974 he developed the Peter Lynn Triangular box kite, a framed triangular form cellular single line kite. Beginning in 1984 with the Centipede design, he then developed large creature-themed display kites for the growing number of international kite festivals. These large-scale sparless kites include the manta ray, octopus, puffer-fish, gecko and trilobite.

In 1987 he began developing power kites for traction uses, and designing boats, buggies, boards and snow sleds to use with them. The sport of kite buggying in its modern form began from a kitesailing craft Lynn developed. It was equipped with three 'skis' and was quite unsuccessful on the water. In 1990 he converted it to a land buggy by replacing the skis with wheels. More than 10,000 of his buggies are now in use, and there are also many other kite buggy manufacturers. Kite buggying has become a popular worldwide sport. Also in 1990, Lynn was awarded the New Zealand 1990 Commemoration Medal.

Inside the 1997 world's largest kite. The thru cord system is visible.

In 1994 he developed the 'super-ripstop/thru cord' ram air kite construction system for large display and traction kites. This is a technique of strengthening ripstop nylon by sewing high-tech dacron or spectra/dyneema cord across the material, and providing an adjustable cross-sectional aerodynamic profile by the use of variable length cords rather than the fixed rib used in a conventional wing or ram-air parafoil such as a parachute.

In 1995 he designed the ram-air inflated Megabite, a 635-square-metre (6,840 sq ft) kite. It was accepted as the world's largest kite by Guinness in 1997. When on the ground, more than 1,000 people can comfortably stroll around inside it. He also designed the current Guinness record holder, a 1,019-square-metre (10,970 sq ft) Kuwait flag, which took over the world record from the Megabite in 2005. That same year, he built two additional identically sized kites (Mega Flag in the United States and Mega Moon in Japan), allowing for more exhibitions of the World's Largest Kites around the world.

In 1997 he developed the first 'hybrid' traction kite. It is referred to as hybrid as the form is a single skin kite supported by a combination of both aerodynamic forces and a flexible frame. Conventional traction kites use either a rigid frame inflated with a pump prior to launching or ram air inflated cavities.

In 1999 he developed the first bridleless arch style ram air kite, primarily for kitesurfing. Arc style kites are generally more efficient (better upwind performance) and are more resistant to luffing (more stable and reliable in gusty conditions) relative to leading edge inflatable (LEI) sled kites but have slightly lower lift coefficient (less power from the same size kite).

Lynn developed the KiteSled (see image), for kite-powered snow expeditioning. It steers by bending its skis, which are constructed from multiple longitudinal elements dovetailed together. Using KiteSleds, in May 2006 Australians Patrick Spiers and Ben Deacon completed a 700-kilometre (430 mi) trans-Greenland journey that they believe was 20% faster than would have been possible by kite skiing.

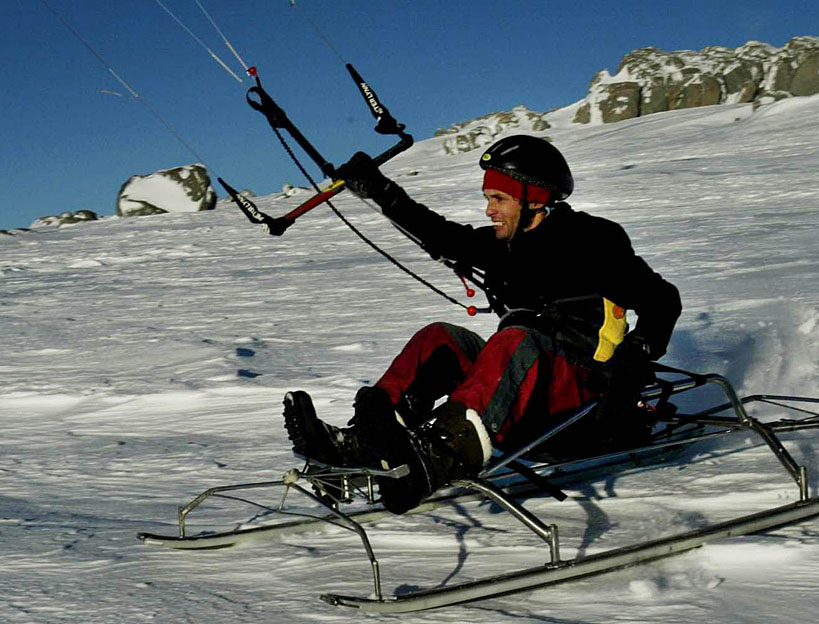
Ben Deacon tests the KiteSled, Thredbo, 2005

Lynn also contributed to the theoretical underpinnings of kite flying through a series of scientific papers.

== Other fields ==
In other fields, his inventions included:

1975. The original 'tipping blade' portable sawmill system, using a single (circular) saw blade which rotates 90 degrees at the end of each pass through a log to enable the production of sawn timber in one operation. While he held the patent on this invention until 1980, after the patent lapsed it became the world standard portable sawmill system.

1987. Started Stirling Research Ltd, and with Donald Clucas began the development of a stirling cycle engine generator for yachts (and later for in-home combined heat and power systems). From 1991, Clucas continued this development through to commercialisation with WisperGen, a business formed for this purpose by elements of the NZ electricity industry.

== Personal life and death ==
Lynn's father, Robert Frederick Lynn (1914–2012) was the founder of the Lynn Historic Woodworking Trust—a collection of historic woodworking tools, equipment and archives, including the world's largest collection of ornamental turning lathes—at The Plains, a colonial era museum park in Ashburton. Robert Fredrick Lynn was awarded the Queen's Service Medal, for community service, in the 2007 New Year Honours.

Lynn died of cancer in Ashburton, on 11 April 2026, at the age of 79.

== Patents ==
- U.S. patent 7,014,149 Traction kite design, filed April 2002, issued March 2006
- U.S. patent 6,837,463 Ram air inflated wing, filed November 2002, issued January 2005
