= Parafoil =

Nonrigid airfoil with aerodynamic cell structure

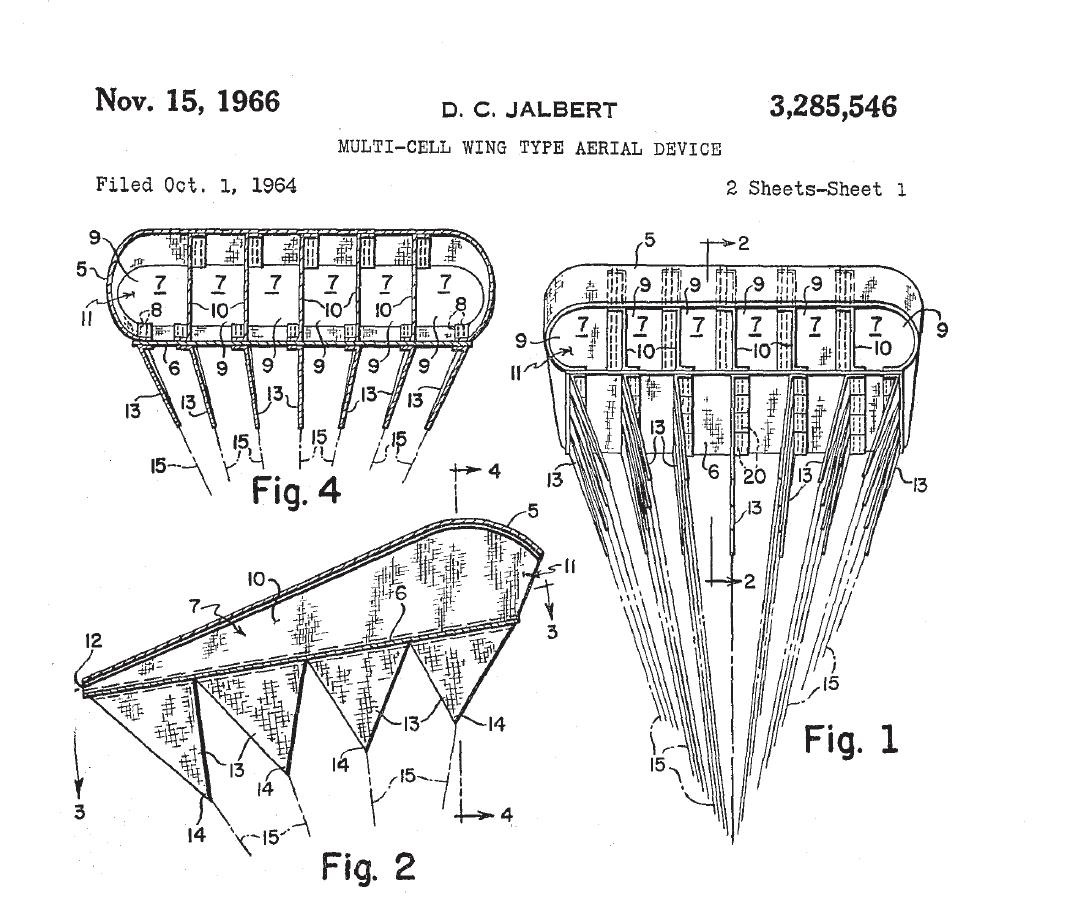
Illustrations from Jalbert's 1966 patent, showing the keels and the airfoil shape.

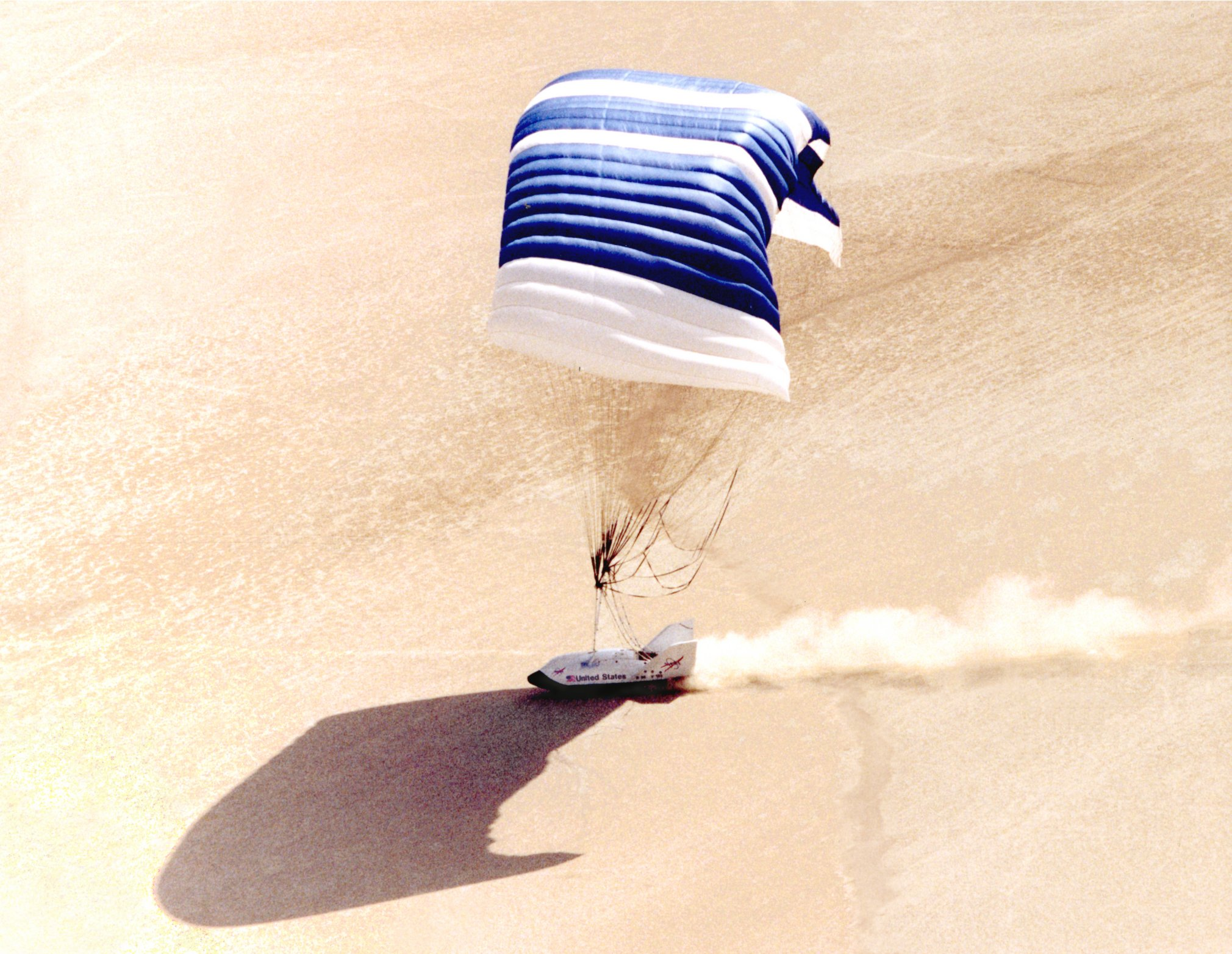
The NASA X-38 prototype makes a gentle lakebed landing at the end of a July 1999 test flight at the Dryden Flight Research Center.

A parafoil is a nonrigid (textile) airfoil with an aerodynamic cell structure which is inflated by the wind. Ram-air inflation (created by dynamic air pressure from the parachute's motion through the air) forces the parafoil into a classic wing cross-section. Parafoils are most commonly constructed out of ripstop nylon.

The device was developed in 1964 by Domina Jalbert (1904–1991). Jalbert had a history of designing kites and was involved in the development of hybrid balloon-kite aerial platforms for carrying scientific instruments. He envisioned the parafoil would be used to suspend an aerial platform or for the recovery of space equipment. A patent was granted in 1966.

Deployment shock prevented the parafoil's immediate acceptance as a parachute. It was not until the addition of a drag canopy on the riser lines (known as a "slider") which slowed their spread that the parafoil became a suitable parachute. Compared to a simple round canopy, a parafoil parachute has greater steerability, will glide further and allows greater control of the rate of descent; the parachute format is mechanically a glider of the free-flight kite type and such aspects spawned paraglider use.

The air flow into the parafoil is coming more from below than the flight path might suggest, so the frontmost ropes tow against the airflow. When gliding, the angle of attack is lowered and the airflow meets the parafoil head on. This makes it difficult to achieve an optimum gliding angle without the parafoil deflating.

In 2019 Jalbert was awarded posthumously the Fédération Aéronautique Internationale (FAI) Gold Parachuting Medal for inventing the parafoil.

Parafoils see wide use in a variety of windsports such as kite flying, powered parachutes, paragliding, kitesurfing, speed flying, wingsuit flying and skydiving. The world's largest kite is a parafoil-variant.

== Patents ==
- U.S. patent 3,285,546 Multi-cell wing type aerial device, filed October 1964, issued November 1966

== See also ==
- Foil kite
