= USS Kite =

USS Kite may refer to the following ships of the United States Navy:

- USS Kite (AM-75), was purchased by the US Navy 11 September 1940 and was sold 2 March 1945
- USS Kite (AM-403) was canceled during construction 12 August 1945
- USS Kite (AMS-22), was launched 17 February 1944 and transferred to the South Korean Navy 6 January 1956
