= Kite buggy =

Recreational vehicle powered by a kite

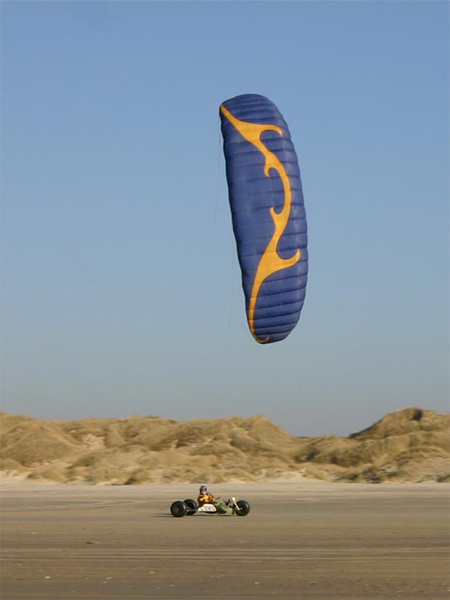
A kite buggy

A kite buggy is a light, purpose-built vehicle powered by a traction kite (power kite). It is single-seated and has one steerable front wheel and two fixed rear wheels. The driver sits in the seat located in the middle of the vehicle and accelerates and slows down by applying steering manoeuvres in coordination with flying manoeuvres of the kite. This activity is called kite buggying. The speed achieved in kite buggies by skilled drivers can range up to around 110 km/h (70 mph), hence protective clothing, including a safety helmet, is commonly worn.

The kite buggy was promulgated by George Pocock (inventor) in the UK in 1827 and kite buggies were available commercially in US and UK in the late 1970s. Peter Lynn is generally attributed with the modern popularization of buggies and kite buggying with his introduction of strong, lightweight, affordable buggies in the early 1990s.

Kite buggying is similar to land yachting, windsurfing or even yachting, and therefore much of its terminology and technique has been adopted from these activities. Kite buggies are classified as "Class 8 Land Yachts " by FISLY and kite buggying competitions are often based on established land yachting guidelines.

== Steering and seat ==
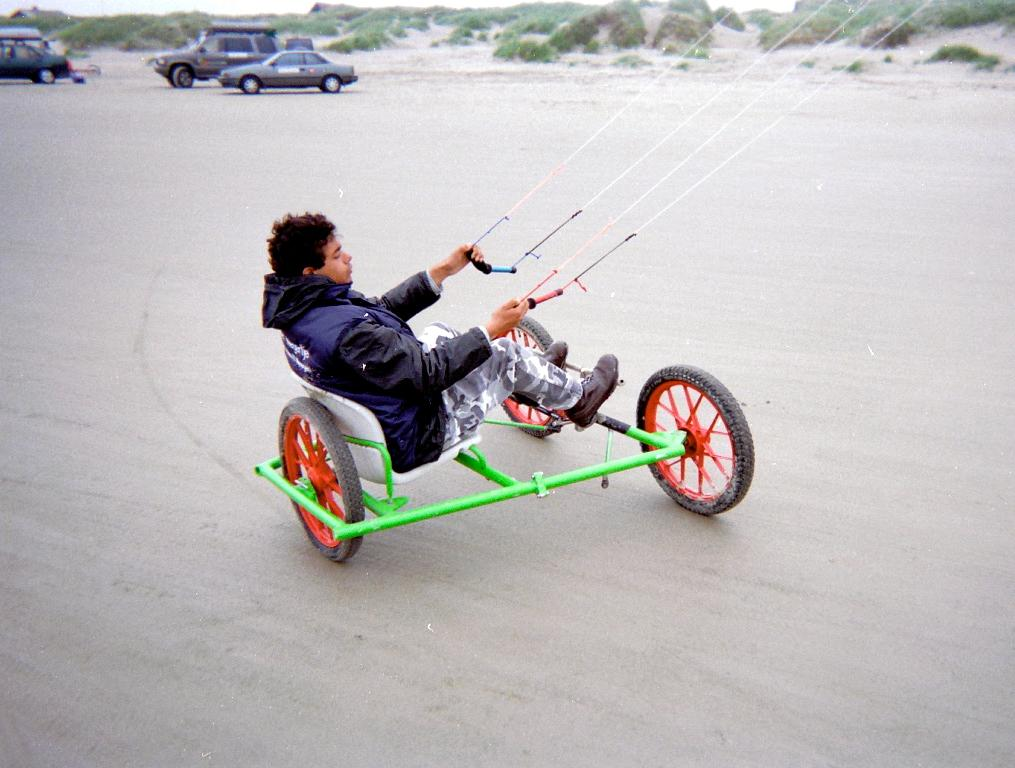
Kite buggying at Fanø

The kite buggy's rear wheels are mounted at the ends of the rear axle. The front wheel is mounted in the front fork. In advanced buggy designs either or both front and rear wheels can be attached via suspension mechanisms.

The front fork is not unlike a bicycle's fork apart from proportions and the fact that there is no handle bar at the top. Instead there are two foot rests sticking out, on the left and right of it, attached to the fork very low down, near where the wheel is mounted. These foot rests have two main purposes:

- they allow the pilot to easily steer the buggy. Pushing the left foot forward will turn the front wheel to the right, pushing the right foot forward will turn the front wheel to the left.
- they allow the pilot to lodge himself tightly into the seat so he is not pulled out of the buggy by the kite.

Foot rests can be fitted with foot straps and grip tape to prevent the feet from sliding off the rests during extreme buggying action. Foot straps are not recommended for beginners, due to the possibility that they will not be able to remove their feet from the pegs if the buggy flips over and therefore risk breaking their ankles.

The seat of the buggy is a bucket style seat giving the pilot good side and back support. This is necessary as the driver has to transfer the force of the used traction kite into the buggy.

== Power and Braking ==
The buggy is powered by a traction kite, controlled by the pilot. The traction kite is normally not directly attached to the buggy. Instead it is—through its lines and handles—either held by the pilot or attached to the pilot by a harness and strop line. The kite is used to accelerate the buggy and also assists in braking.

The buggy itself does not have any dedicated braking system that would apply a braking force directly to the wheels.

== Frame, Wheels and Weight ==
The geometry and measurements of a buggy's frame determine what kind of buggying activities it is best suited for.

Longer buggies are generally more stable on a straight line whereas shorter buggies tend to be more nimble when cornering. A wider rear axle will make the buggy more resistant against accidentally toppling over. However, intentional trick riding, e.g. on only two wheels (the front and one of the rear wheels), is more difficult. Rear axles will generally be in the range of about 1 to 2 metres (3 ft 3 in to 6 ft 7 in). Shorter or longer measures are possible for more extreme applications.

Possible styles of wheels vary from very thin (like a speed-sail's wheels) over standard size (like a wheelbarrow's) to very large, also known as "big foot". Wheels are not constructed with exposed bare spokes (like bicycle wheels are) because this would put the buggy driver's hands and kite handles at risk of getting caught in the wheel.

The different types of wheels are used in different terrain conditions and buggying activities. A few examples include:

- thin rim wheel: best used on very firm ground; activities: race and speed buggying
- standard size wheel: best used on very to moderately firm sand, not too bumpy fields; activities: general buggying, trick buggying
- big foot: best used on beaches of any kind, fields, even if uneven and bumpy; activities: general buggying, trick buggying, racing

The buggy's (and pilot's) mass has a considerable impact on its handling. A very light buggy is more agile and quicker to manoeuvre. A heavier buggy does not slide sideways as easily, enabling it to transfer higher lateral kite forces into the ground via friction. This allows the use of higher powered kites which can propel the buggy to higher speeds.

To increase the usable kite force, a buggy can be equipped with additional weights. These weights will be attached to the buggy as low down as possible to keep the overall centre of gravity low. Also possible is filling some of the buggy frame's usually hollow tubes with a dense substance such as lead.

== Tandem Configurations ==
Some buggies allow for attaching a second buggy using a specialized kind of trailer coupling.

Buggies joined up like this can be powered by a single kite controlled by the pilot in the first buggy. This allows the passenger in the second buggy to be simply pulled along passively.

Alternatively, a tandem kite configuration can be flown where both front and rear buggy pilots steer a separate and independent kite each. This requires very skilled pilots and good communication between them.

== Extensions, Custom Designs ==
In addition to the traditional 3-wheeled buggy there are designs applying 4 wheels—with a more complex steering mechanism. Even 2-wheeled buggies exist—with only one single wheel at the back instead of the common 2-wheel rear axle.

Some buggies can be equipped with ice skating blades replacing the wheels for use on ice or cut-down skis for use on snow.

== Buggy jumping ==
Buggy jump

One of the more extreme manifestations of the sport is buggy jumping. This involves the pilot being physically attached—which is not the case for the other, more moderate kite buggying activities—to the buggy by means of a lap belt and the use of relatively large kites.

The pilot flies the kite overhead to generate maximum lift and is then—with the buggy—hoisted up to tens of feet into the air. Very advanced pilots even perform aerial manoeuvres such as 360° (or more) spins, sidewinders, pendulum swings and reverse landings.

== Safety ==
Kite buggying and other traction kite activities can be classified as extreme sports. Wind is the only power source and is often very unpredictable. An attitude of caution and respect towards the wind is essential, for the novice just as well as the advanced pilot.

Common advice is to start with a relatively small kite in relatively low wind conditions (e.g. 2-to-3-square-metre (22 to 32 sq ft) kites in winds of force 2 to 3 bft) and progress to bigger kites or higher wind conditions as ability improves. Novices should first achieve and practice full control over their kite before considering the next step, the actual kite buggying.

Performing the sport, the kite buggy pilot has to always act responsibly and make sure to not harm bystanders or cause damage to the environment or property. Choosing a kiting location with enough space is crucial for this.

All possible safety precautions should be taken: protective clothing and an adequate helmet are a must. Helmets to be considered are downhill mountain bike helmets with chin guard (light, well ventilated, good field of vision) or paragliding helmets (light, relatively well ventilated, good field of vision). True motorbike helmets are often considered less suitable as they are relatively heavy and the field of vision can be impaired (when kite buggying, both the kite itself and the terrain around the buggy should be easily visible).

A frequent cause of accidents is flying a kite too large for the wind conditions and experience of the pilot. In such a case buggy and pilot tend to be pulled downwind, often skidding and sliding sideways with a high risk of the pilot entirely losing control of kite and buggy. This can be avoided by flying kites small enough so that they allow the pilot to safely stop the buggy by turning it through the wind and driving upwind.

Pilots are encouraged to obtain 3rd party liability insurance as there is a risk of coming into contact with bystanders or each other. Such insurance is available through the various national and regional organisations like the South and West Association of Traction Kiting (SWATK) or the British Power Kitesports Association (BPKA).

Responsible shops should strongly discourage newcomers from buying very powerful kites without instruction. They should also offer or help organising tuition for novice pilots, ideally through PKSF-accredited instructors.

As with all kite-flying activities, the kiting code of conduct applies.

== See also ==
- Buggy (disambiguation)
- Buggy (automobile)
- Kite landboarding
- Kitesurfing
- Snowkiting
- Windsport
