= Kite rollerskating =

Kiteskating – inline, off-road skates pulled by controllable parafoil kites.

Kite skating, sometimes referred to as Kiteblading, is a land-based extreme sport that uses powerful and controllable kites to propel riders of inline skates or off-road skates. They can reach speeds up to 60+ mph across parking lots, desert dry lakes, grassy fields, and sandy beaches.

Four-line, steerable para-foil kites are used as the power source. Typically used in rough terrain, kite skates use large pneumatic tires (8 to 12 inch diameter). Similar to Kite ice skating.
