= Kite landboarding =

Using a kite to ride a landboard across land

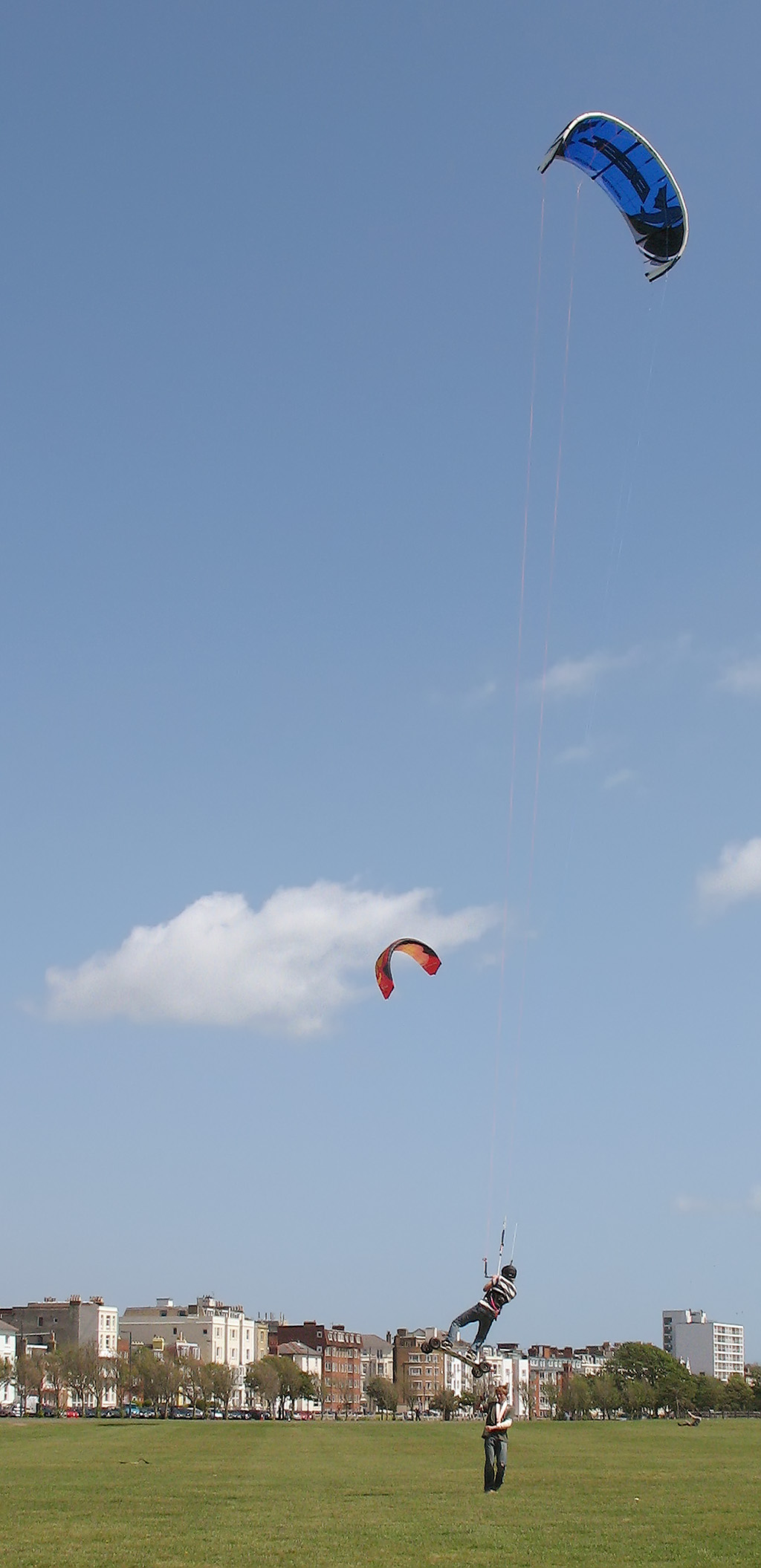
A kite landboarder in action.

Kite landboarding, also known as land kiteboarding or flyboarding, is based on the sport of kitesurfing, where a rider on a surf-style board is pulled over water by a kite. Kite landboarding involves the use of a mountain board or landboard, which is essentially an oversized skateboard with large pneumatic wheels and foot-straps. Kite landboarding is a growing sport, and there are several competitions. Kite landboarding is attracting growing publicity although it is not yet as popular or as well known as kitesurfing.

== Technique ==
Typically, kite landboarding takes place in large open areas where the wind is constant and there are no obstructions such as trees or people. Large hard-packed sandy beaches are typical landboarding locations because of the large space available and wind conditions.

The rider starts off by getting the kite into a neutral position overhead. Once strapped onto the board, the rider can orient the kite such that it pulls the rider across the ground. This is done by moving the kite in either direction, generating a pull. As in kitesurfing, competent riders are able to "get some air" which is essentially maneuvering the kite to pull the rider into the air, possibly several feet up. More competent riders are able to do several moves in the air such as grabs, rotations and flips.

== Tricks ==
More advanced riders can do a number of tricks that are mainly based on those found in kitesurfing and wakeboarding. These include tricks while the rider is in the air which could involve rotations, flips, grabs, or combinations of these tricks. "Board-off" moves are tricks where the rider removes the board from his feet in the air and he can spin or flip it before putting it back on his feet and landing. On the ground, tricks include sliding the board, wheelies and riding toeside (riding with your back to the kite). Various tricks have not readily transitioned from kitesurfing due to the harder surface involved. One such trick is the "kiteloop" which involves looping the kite through the power zone while the kiter is in the air, giving a strong horizontal (and sometimes downwards) pull. In addition to these kitesurfing based tricks, there are also a number of skateboarding style accessories that have become popular such as ramps and grinders. In recent years, specific kite landboarding parks have opened with large areas and ramps and other obstacles available.

== Equipment ==
The kite is a large sail, usually made of strong ripstop nylon, and is flown on either 2, 3, 4 or 5 lines. Models of kites can have several different sizes within the range - because the stronger the wind is, the smaller the kite used. The kite is controlled via a control bar or a set of handles (kite control systems). There are various types of kites used in kite landboarding. Foil type kites, from manufacturers such as FreakDog, HQ Powerkites, Flexifoil, Ozone Kites, Flysurfer or Best Kiteboarding can be fixed bridle or de-power systems. De-power systems allow the rider to change the kites angle by moving the bar toward or away from them to power or de-power the kite respectively. Most riders prefer de-powerable kites as it is possible to easily adjust the power in case of gusts or an increase in wind speeds. Alternatively "arcs" are growing in popularity thanks to several kites made by Peter Lynn.

There are many different types of boards. Landboards are often made out of wood, although some riders prefer lighter composite boards. Size and width of the board varies. Longer and wider boards are more stable and tend to be for larger riders or beginners while narrower smaller boards are for smaller people or for pulling off more tricks. Many boards also have suspensions which can be adjusted to preference. These can usually be adjusted by adjusting the actual suspension or by inserting a "shock egg" (an egg shaped rubber shock absorber) into the suspension. The boards also have some similar features to kitesurfing boards, and have similar style bindings to keep the rider's feet locked into place. They allow the board to stay with the rider while airborne but they are also easy to remove in the case of any "board-off" tricks. Many also have a grab handle in the centre of the board in order to facilitate the removing of the board during a trick.

Some riders attach the kite's handle or control bar via a strap to a harness worn by the rider, allowing the rider to remove his hands from the control system in order to do tricks. The use of a harness also allows a rider to ride for a longer time, as much of the force of the kite is taken off the rider's arms. For de-powerable kites, the harness connection is used to power and de-power the kite. There are different types of harnesses (e.g., waist or seat), and selection depends on the personal preference of the rider. Some riders use specially designed snowkiting harnesses that are very similar to those used in rock climbing (or just reuse rock climbing harnesses). Because harnesses keep the rider attached to the kite, a number of safety measures have been developed. These include easily reachable safety systems actuated by pins. The pins allow the rider to release the connection between the rider and the kite when necessary. Some harnesses also have an easily accessible knife to cut the lines if necessary in an emergency.

Other commonly used pieces of equipment include a groundstake (in order to hold down the kite when it is landed), a wind meter (to read the exact speed of the wind) as well as various spares, tools and repair tape. In addition various types of safety equipment described below are essential to the sport.

== Safety concerns ==
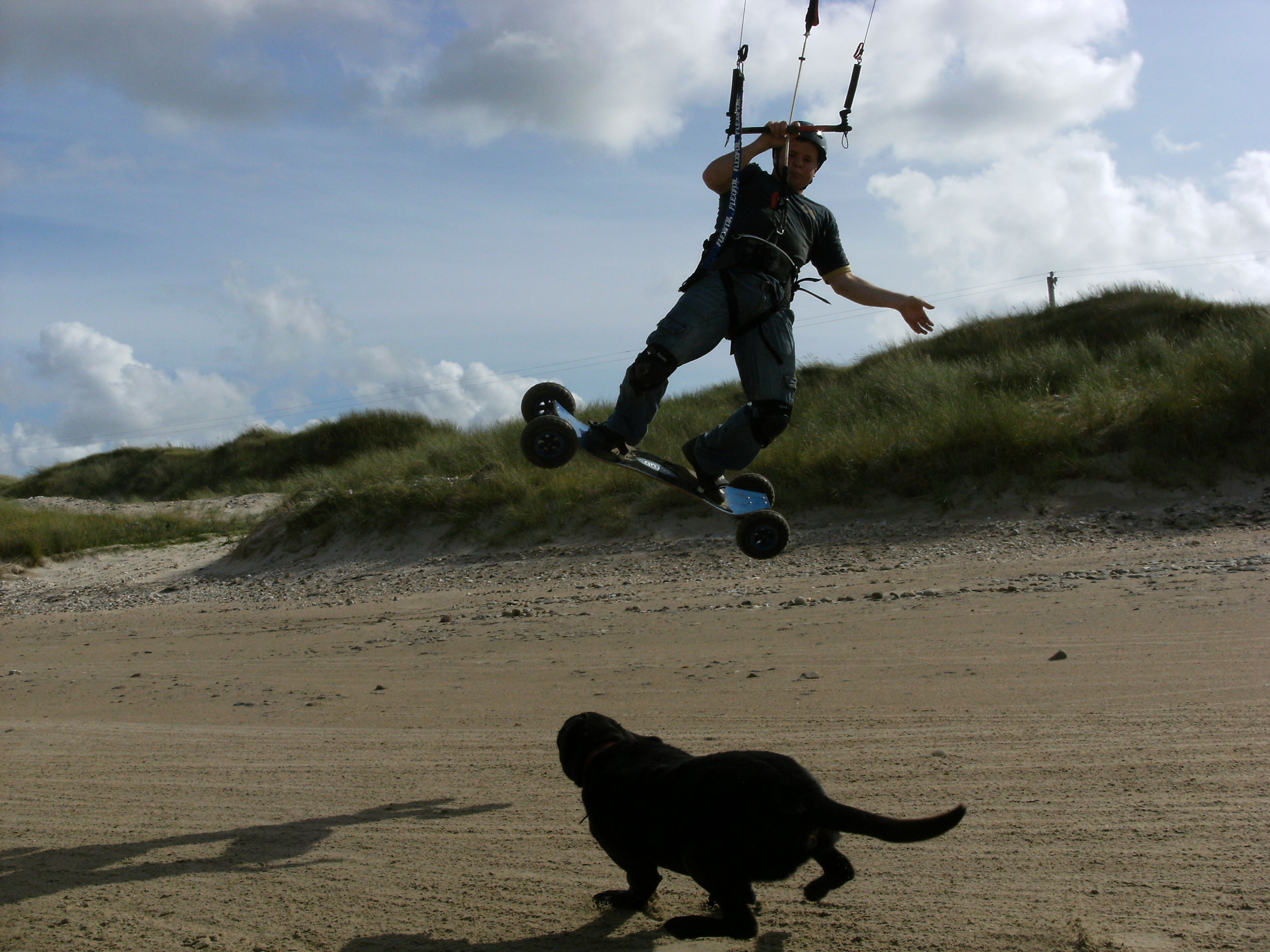
Landboard rider in North Mayo, Ireland, wearing helmet and knee pads

Due to the power that the kites can generate, riders can hit high speeds and propel themselves several feet in the air. As this is a land-based sport, there have been several concerns about the possibility of injury to the rider or to others. As a result, several safety equipment items are used by riders in this sport. Helmets are essential, especially for the more advanced moves, where a rider may find himself rotating and flipping. Padding, including shoulder and knee pads, can be worn to protect from hard falls. Many kite-flying sites in the UK are introducing measures to only allow riders who have helmets and have valid 3rd party insurance policies.

In addition to this, many kite manufacturers have incorporated safety designs in their kites in order to depower the kite in order to stop it dragging the rider after a fall and protecting any other people in the vicinity. These tend to include safety leashes connected to the rider which, when the rider lets go of the kite's control system, will completely depower the kite and bring it gently back to the ground.

Before Kite Landboarding, the rider should assess their chosen kitespot for any risks, making sure that they are keeping themselves and other people around them safe. This can be done with the mnemonic SHOE.

Surface – Is the terrain good for landboarding? Hard sand is a great surface to landboard on.

Hazards – Are you in a big open space away from downwind hazards?

Other People – Are you on a quiet beach or field? Give other beach users space and keep them safe.

Environment – How windy is it? How does the tide affect you? Are you using the correct equipment?

== History ==
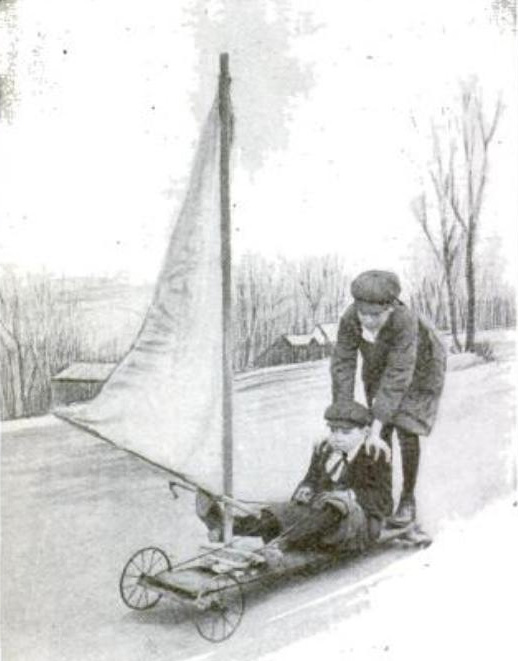
A young boy's 1916 "windmobile". (Popular Science Monthly, Feb 1916, p170)

An early form of the wheeled landboard was invented by children in New York state in 1916 using roller skates, baby carriage wheels, a wooden board and a cloth sail:

With front and rear wheels oiled well, and a brisk breeze blowing, he can travel at a 20 mile-per-hour clip without much difficulty, despite the crude construction of the vehicle.

== See also ==
- Windsport
- Land sailing
