= Kite mooring =

Methods used to secure a kite in flight

Kite mooring refers to a specific method used to secure a kite in flight. The two fundamental parts of a kite are the wing and the kite line. The kite must be moored to a mobile or fixed object to develop tension in the kite line which converts to lift and drag, enabling the kite to fly.

Governments frequently regulate the mooring of atmospheric balloons and atmospheric kites operating in governed airspace. The United States Federal Aviation Regulation Part 101 regulates the mooring of qualified kites and balloons in U.S. governed airspace. These regulations do not apply to ungoverned spaces and special ambient flying media.

== Static mooring ==
When the kite lines of a flying kite are moored to a non-moving object, the kite is considered to be statically moored. The kite operator is responsible for kites moored to static objects under the regulations of the governing body. Mooring kites to static objects occurs for various reasons. The tension in a kite line may be so strong that the kite line pulls off its mooring or breaks the mooring. Injury to property and people may result when a kite or kite system is improperly moored. A kite may drag its mooring inadvertently so that unintended consequences occur.

=== Soil mooring ===
To safely moor kites to the soil, various kinds of anchors can be used. Some kite stores sell stakes for kite anchoring (mooring). The literature has noted that dog-parking helical metal stakes make suitable soil anchors for some kites. The wind strength and kite line tension would be estimated with some safety margin to ensure safe operation.

== Dynamic or mobile mooring ==
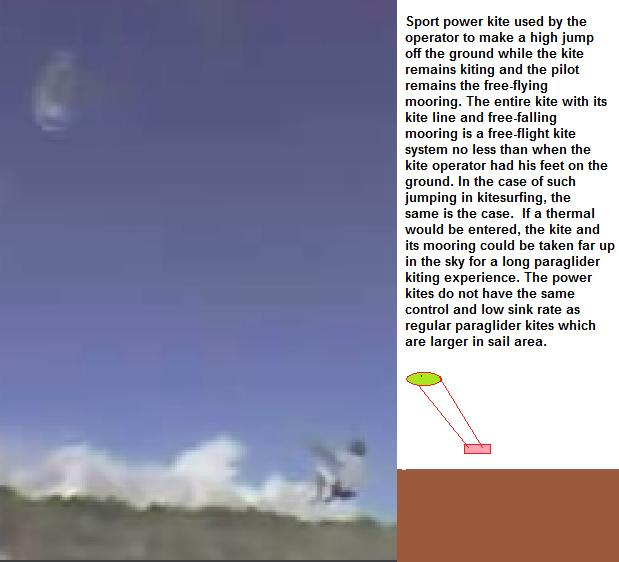
Free-flight kite system.

A person holding a kite line by hand may move their hands to control the kite in kite fighting or stunt-kite flying. Also, the person may walk with or against the wind for various reasons. All of these are examples of mobile kite mooring. Other mobile kite moorings include a towing scooter, a towing bicycle, a skateboard, a wave-moved surfboard or kiteboard, a cargo-ship, a boat, a horse, a dog, a raft, and many other moving vehicles or machines. Some kiters moor a kite to a floating object and let the kite tow the object across ponds, lakes, or bays. Some persons moor themselves to kites and let the kite tow them across water bodies, sand expanses, and grass fields. Others moor themselves to kite lines where the kite is a very large wing while they jump off hills and mountains to fly their kites in the special kiting mode that is then called hang gliding. Since the pilot is mobile, then the mooring is a dynamic mooring. U.S. FAR 101 covers the dynamically moored manned hang gliders without using the word "mooring" in the regulation. Some hang gliders are not kites; some hang gliders are kites.

== Mooring accidents ==
When flying a world-record-sized recreation kite, a famous professional kite flier lost his life as he became an accidental mooring of the large kite. When extreme-sport kitesurfers are themselves the dynamic mooring gone astray, they sometimes slam into rocks, buildings, people, thorns, trees and end up with minor to fatal injuries. The kite system called paraglider has the human pilot as the dynamic mooring; when collapse of the kite's wing occurs too near the ground and there is not time to use a parachute, damage occurs to people and property. When a statically moored kite-type hang glider is moored improperly, gusts sometimes lift the kite and the kite hang glider gets into a lockout condition and slams into the ground, breaking itself and sometimes causing injury to persons and other property. Mooring kites so the kite can reach high voltage electric power lines can cause outages in electrical service and sometimes injury or death to people. Most every recreational kite sold has a tag that refers to where to fly the kite; this is implicitly telling the operator to keep the kite moored in a safe manner. Humans are responsible for the kites they anchor or set into free-flight. One of the downsides to the war-time use of barrage balloon (kytoons) involved cut tether cables that dragged into power lines causing loss of production of other needed goods. See the safety list at National Kite Month.

== Line handling ==
Kite lines are stored in a mooring situation; a storage device or reels become part of the mooring. When a human kite operator holds a reel, the kite line may be let out or wound back onto the reel. The kite operator is the mooring, yet the reel is part of the mooring situation; the reel and the reeling of the kite line has many parameters that make for successful kite operating. Similarly, the kite lines for large cargo-ship kite systems need to be carefully designed to hold and operate the kite lines; huge pressures on the reels require that reels be designed to fit the task.

Kite lines may be damaged when improperly reeled; twist to the kite line may unintentionally increase or decrease when kite line is let out and replaced on the reel incorrectly. The pattern of keeping the kite line on reel cores is given attention by kite operators. De-tensioning kite lines before storing on a reel is done when needed for safety and maintenance of kite line integrity. Avoiding excessive twist, burn, pressure accumulation, cutting, tangles, and knotting during mooring are important aspects of kite operating; injury and death have resulted from inadequate care for handling kite lines. Lines moored to control bars, masts, poles, stakes, anchors, reels, hooks, etc. mean that the mooring being operated requires mechanical reliability of these parts during kite operation.

The mooring of a kite system requires the line holding mechanisms to remain fully operational during all anticipated contingencies of flight sessions. Reels themselves are sometimes involved in special applications like generating electricity. When kiting a hang glider for pay-out launching, the timing of the reel's release of kite line is very important. Reels powered by scooters are kiting manned hang gliders off flatland.

=== Kite reel patents ===
- IMPROVEMENT IN REELS FOR CLOTHES-LINES AND KITE-STRINGS Durene K. Norton, 1874.
- KITE REEL Wong U. S. Patent:3652027 filing date: Oct 8, 1970.
- U.S. Patent number: 282620 Filing date: Feb 3, 1883. This mechanism handles a water kite or underwater inverted kite.
- Reel for flying kites. John C. Gunn. U.S. Patent 274490 of 1883.
- Reel by Albert M. McGuire. U.S. Patent 850236 Filing date: Aug 28, 1908
- Kite reel. U.S. Patent 1067643
- Combination kite control and reel device U.S. Patent: 4796827 Filing date: Aug 26, 1987.
- Kite-string holder. U.S. Patent 1296268 of 1919.
- KITE REEL by George D. Wanner, 1921. US Pat. 1414237 - Filed Apr 18,1921.
- Wind drive apparatus for an aerial wind power generation system by Gaylord G. Olson. US Pat. 7275719 - Filed Feb 9, 2007

== See also ==
- Kite
- Kite line
- Kite applications
- Kite types
- Hang glider
- Mooring (watercraft)
