= Bow kite =

Leading edge inflatable kites

Diagram of a bow kite

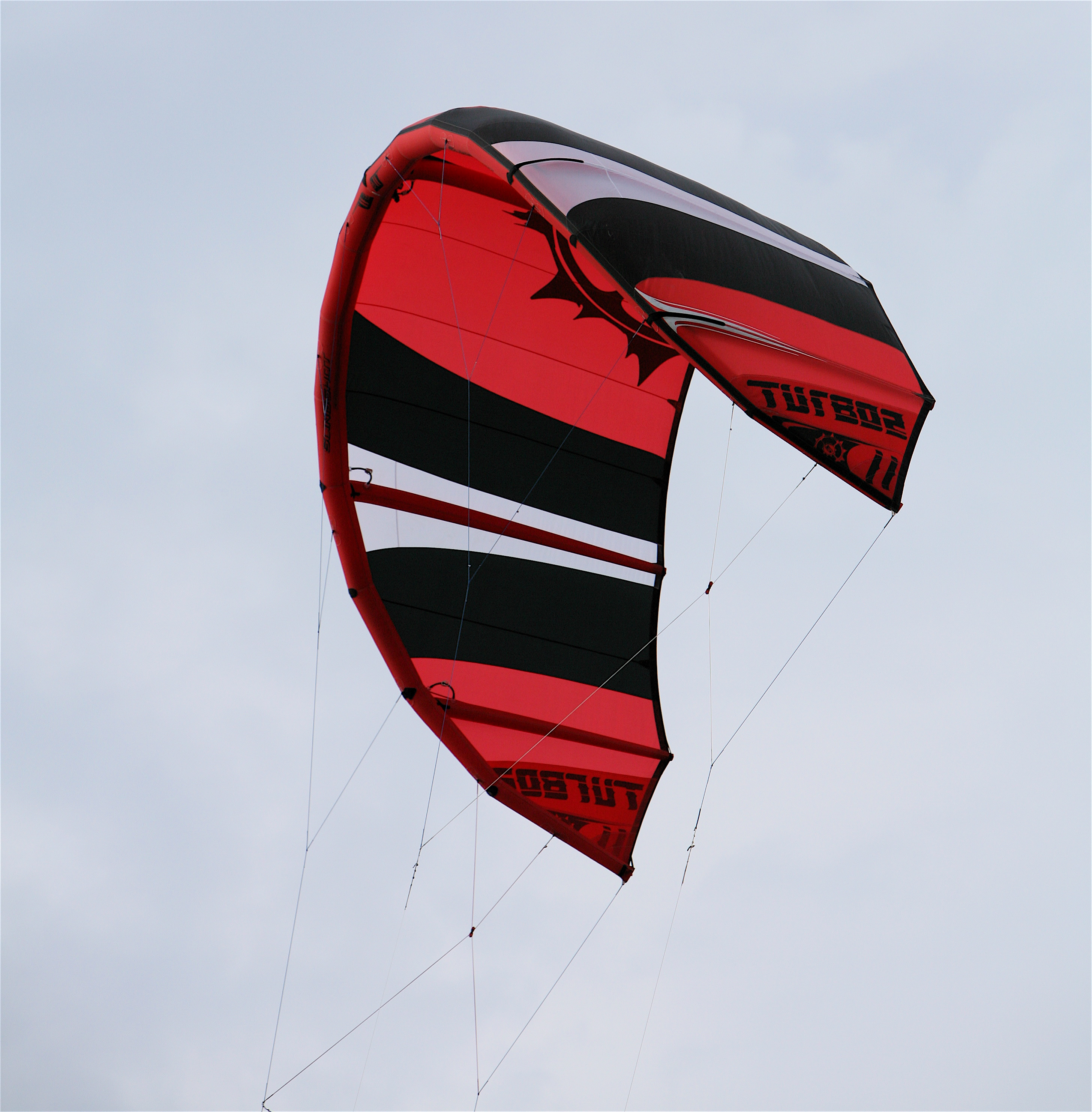
A bow kite

Bow kites are leading-edge inflatable kites (LEI kites) that incorporate a bridle on the leading edge. They are used for the sport of kiteboarding. Bow kites can be identified by a flat, swept-back profile and concave trailing edge, allowing the kite greater depower.

The bow kite design was pioneered by Bruno Legaignoux, and has been licensed to many kite manufacturers.

Bow kites have a wider wind range than C-kites (traditional LEI kites), so two kite sizes (7 and 12 square metres (75 and 129 sq ft)) could form an effective quiver for winds ranging from 10 to 30 knots for a 75-kilogram (165 lb) rider. This makes bow kites more suitable for beginners to kite sports; however, they are also used by professionals.

Bow kites are used in a variety of kite-related sports, including kiteboarding and snowkiting. Because of their depower range, they allow users to combat problems caused by gusts, making them safer to use. They are also used by kite surfers for wave riding, as their unique shape lends itself to this discipline.

== Early kites ==
While early bow kites allowed the kite to be fully depowerable, they had a number of disadvantages compared to classic C-kites. These included possible inversion of the kite; less stability; heavier bar pressure, leading to greater user fatigue; more difficult relaunch; and lack of "sled boosting" effect when jumping. In 2006, second-generation flat LEI kites were developed, which improved many previous issues. The bridle and control bar design has later been refined to give a more direct feel and less bar pressure, while small modifications to the kites themselves have provided more stable kites less likely to invert.
