= Snowkiting =

Using kite power to glide on snow or ice

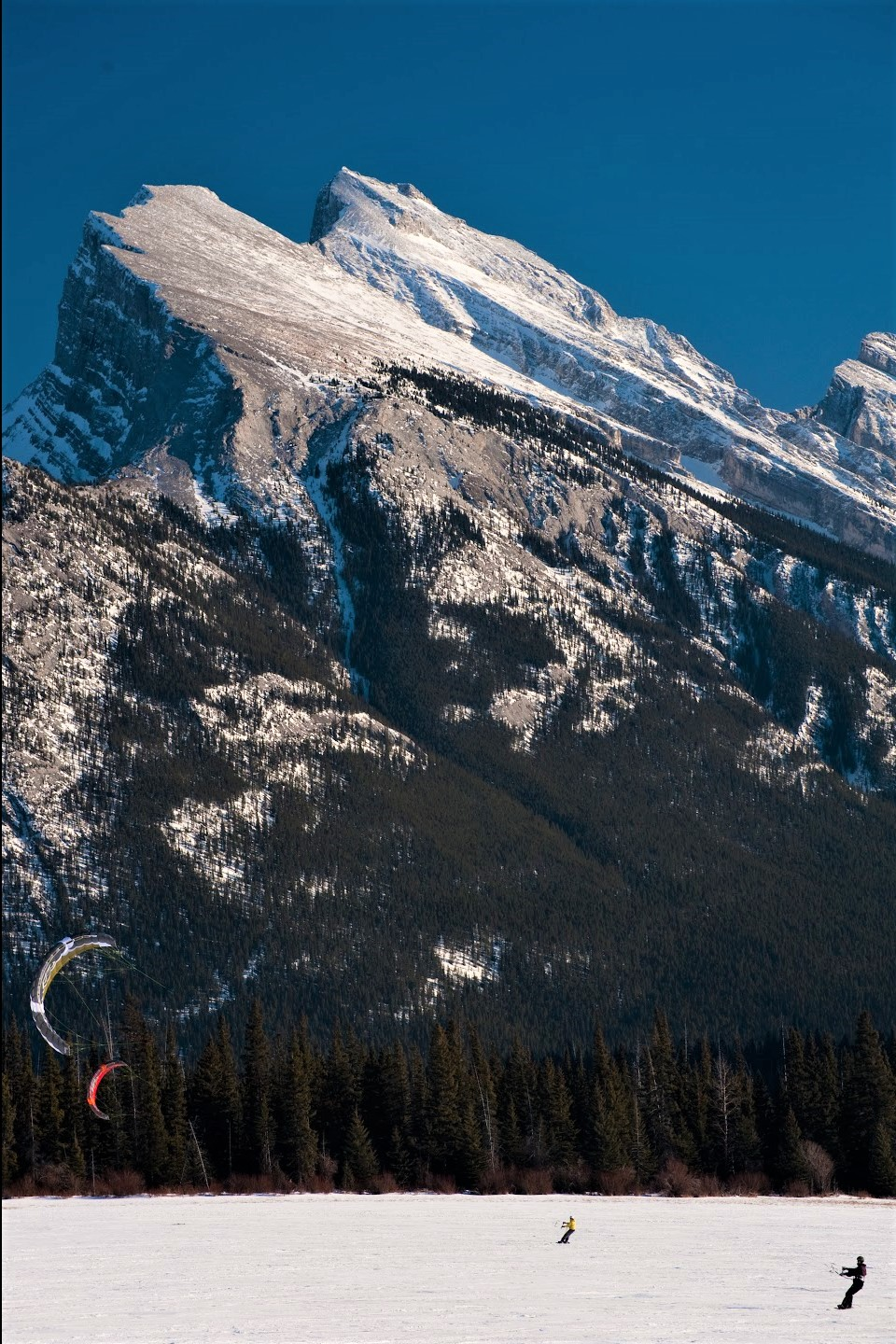
Snowkiting: Mt. Rundle, Banff N.P., Canada

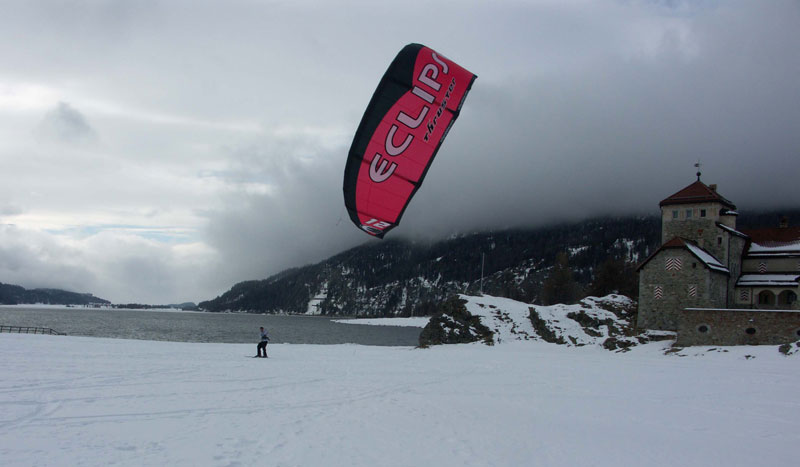
Snowkiters use large kites to travel across snow and jump in the air.

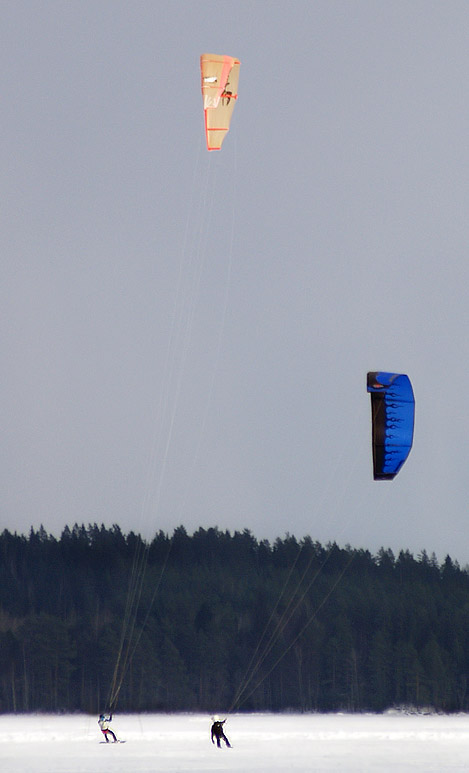
Snowkiting on lake Kallavesi, Kuopio, Finland in March 2005.

Snowkiting

Snowkiting (with variants of kite skiing and kite snowboarding) is an outdoor winter sport in which a skier or snowboarder uses the power generated by a kite to propel them over snow or sometimes ice. With proper wind and terrain conditions, the kite can be used for jumps as well. The kite handling is similar to water-based kiteboarding. The kites used in snowboarding are identical or similar to the ones used on water, with a slight preference for foil kites, especially single skin foil kites. Since 2013, newly developed racing foil kites dominate speed races and expedition races, like Red Bull Ragnarok (held on the Norwegian Hardangervidda plateau) and the Vake mini-expedition race (held at Norway's most northern Varanger peninsula). Snowkiting differs from other alpine sports in that it is possible for the snowkiter to travel uphill and downhill with any wind direction. Like kiteboarding, snowkiting can be very hazardous and should be learned and practiced with care. Snowkiting has become more popular in places often associated with skiing and snowboarding, such as Russia, Canada, Iceland, France, Switzerland, Austria, Norway, Sweden, Finland and the Northern and Central United States. The sport has become more diverse as adventurers use kites to travel great distances and sports enthusiasts push the boundaries of freestyle, big air, speed and backcountry exploration.

== History ==
=== 20th century ===
As a child Dieter Strasilla, inspired by Otto Lilienthal, practiced gliding around Berchtesgaden. In the 1960s he began parapente experiments (also with his brother Udo in USA) in Germany and Switzerland, parachute-skiing in 1972. He later perfected a kiteskiing system using self-made paragliders and a ball-socket swivel, allowing the pilot to kitesail upwind or uphill, but also to take off into the air at will, swivelling the body around to face the right way.

Kiteskiers began kiteskiing on many frozen lakes and fields in the US Midwest and on the East Coast. Lee Sedgwick and a group of kiteskiers in Erie, Pennsylvania were early ice/snow kiteskiers. In 1982 Wolf Beringer started developing his shortline Parawing system for skiing and sailing. This was used by several polar expeditions to kite-ski with sleds, sometimes covering large distances. Ted Dougherty began manufacturing 'foils' for kiteskiing and Steve Shapson of Force 10 Foils also began manufacturing 'foils' using two handles to easily control the kite. In the mid-1980s Shapson, while icesailing, took out an old two line kite and tried to ski upwind on a local frozen lake in Wisconsin. Shapson demonstrated the sport of 'kiteskiing' in Poland, Germany, Switzerland and Finland. He also used grass skis to kiteski on grassy fields. Early European kiteskiers were Keith Stewart and Theo Schmidt, who also were among the first to waterski with kites. American Cory Roeseler together with his father William developed a Kiteski system for waterskiing and began winning in windsurf races featuring high following winds, such as in the Columbia River Gorge. The following terms describe the sport of 'Traction Kiting' or some refer to as 'Power Kiting': Kite buggying, kite skiing, kitesurfing and kite landboarding.

In the mid-1980s e.g. some alpine skiers used a rebridled square parachute to ski upwind on a frozen bay in Erie, PA. In the late 1990s small groups of French and North American riders started pushing the boundaries of modern freestyle snowkiting. The Semnoz crew from France began hosting events at the Col du Lautaret and other European sites where the mountainous terrain lent itself to "paragliding" down the hills. In North America, riders were mainly riding snow-covered lakes and fields where tricks were being done on the flat ground, jumps, rails and sliders.

Between 15 November 1996 and 17 January 1997, Børge Ousland became the first in the world to do an unsupported solo crossing of the Antarctic, 1,864 miles from the edge of the Ronne Ice Shelf to the edge of the Ross Ice Shelf. The ski journey was made with kite assistance, and also holds the record for the fastest unsupported journey to the South Pole (taking just 34 days).

=== 21st century ===
The 2000s have seen a giant leap forward in snowkite-specific technologies, skill levels and participants in every possible snow-covered country. The development of snowkite specific, de-powerable, foil kites have allowed snowkiters to explore further and push the limits of wind-powered expeditions. Recent crossings in record times of large snowfields and even Greenland have been accomplished through the use of snowkites.

On the forefront of extreme freestyle snowkiting, dedicated snowkiting communities from Utah to Norway are pushing the freestyle envelope and documenting their efforts through films like Something Stronger and Dimensions, and Snowkite Magazine which is available as a digital magazine. The extreme envelope of snowkiting freestyle and back country is being pushed by Chasta, a French kiter sponsored by Ozone Kites now based in New Zealand.

Better equipment, safety practices, community know-how and qualified instructors are readily available in many areas, allowing people to learn properly and safely through different means than trial and error. The sport is currently being enjoyed by kiters of all ages and in a wide variety of activities ranging from mellow jaunts on a lake, to kitercross events, from multi-day expeditions, to flying off mountains, from freestyle jib tricks, to huge cliff jumps as well as endurance and course racing.

On 20 January 2007, during the Antarctic summer, Team N2i became the first people to reach the Antarctic pole of inaccessibility without powered aid, using kite skiing as their primary means of propulsion.

There is a small segment of kiters that participate in GPS speed competitions where kiters record speed data on a GPS unit and submit it to a coordinating body for comparison to other kiter's speeds. In the Stormboarding world wide speed ranking Joe Levins, an American kiter, was the first to reach 70 mph/112 km/h in 2008. In 2009 Christopher Krug, an American kiter sponsored by Peter Lynn Kiteboarding pushed the envelope further to a speed of 73.5 mph/118 km/h.

On 5 June 2010, Canadian Eric McNair-Landry and American-French Sebastian Copeland kite-skied 595 kilometres (370 mi) in 24 hours to set a distance world record. The team completed the first partial east to west crossing of Antarctica using kites, a distance of over 4,000 kilometers via Pole of Inaccessibility research station and the South Pole over 82 days in 2011–12.

== Technique and Ride ==
Snowkiting is very similar to kitesurfing in technique. It is harder to maintain balance than with basic snowboarding, since the hands and arms have to control the kite and thus are not completely available for balance. However, the balance issue can be somewhat offset by the up-and-forward force generated by the kite.

With previous snowboard models, it was necessary to minimize side cuts to avoid inadvertently riding upwind. This happens because in leaning back to be a counterweight against the force of the kite, the heels of the snowkiter naturally dig into the snow, causing the board to turn upwind. Modern reverse camber snowboards have addressed this problem.

The specialized skis for snowkiting are 215 cm long with a radius of 100-150m, and snowkiteboards are 200 cm long. Rotational snowboard bindings that go between the board and traditional boot binding are often used. The rotational binding relieves stress in the ankles and knees often associated with snowkiting.

== Terrain ==
Kite Boarding is practical on very many areas, as long as there is a significant amount of wind to keep the kite up. It is not always used on slopes, and can in fact be used with no slope, or even an upwards slope, as long as there is enough wind to offset the drag incurred. It can prove more difficult to have any riding time when you go on a steeper slope, as the wind can be blocked and or become turbulent passing over the peak of the hill, causing the kite to behave erratically and even fall or be pushed to the ground.

== See also ==
- Skiing
- Snowboarding
- Windsport
