= Claire Lutz =

American kitesurfer

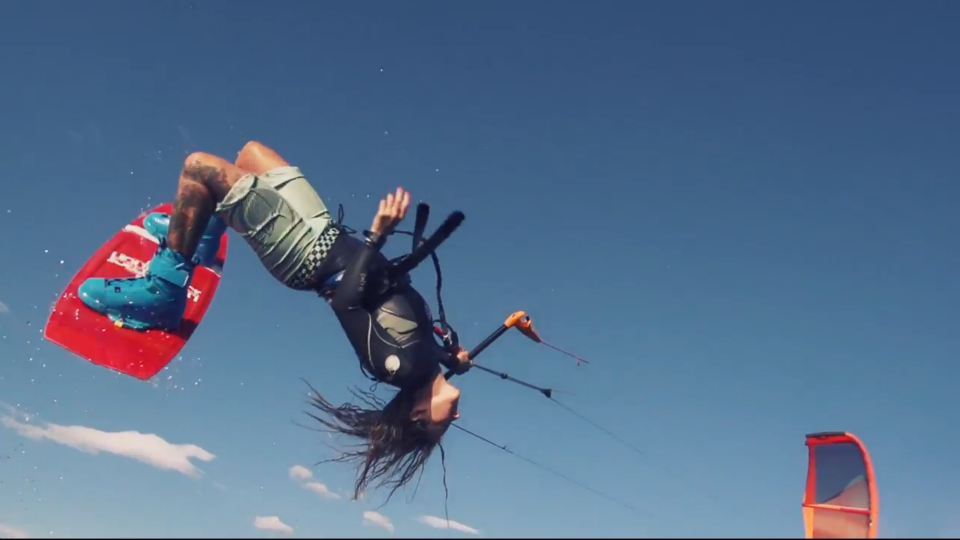
- Claire Lutz kiteboarding
- Born: November 22, 1986 (age 38); St. Joseph, Michigan, U.S.
- Occupation: American kitesurfer

Claire Lutz (born November 22, 1986, in St. Joseph, Michigan) is an American female kite surfer and lives in Orlando. Claire has been a presence in slider riding in kiteboarding, cable riding, and she’s been featured in publications and websites from Alliance Wake to Stance Planet. She is currently starring in a YouTube series, Wake Town. She is sponsored by Liquid Force, Jetpilot, Sensi Bikinis and custom projects sunglasses.

== Titles ==
- 1st place Triple-S 2012 Women’s Winching
- 3rd place Triple-S 2012 Women’s Sliders
- 2nd place Triple-S 2013 Women’s Sliders
- 2nd place Triple-S 2014 Women’s Sliders
- Finalist of "Who is the “Most Influential Girl Kitesurfer” for 2012" contest
- Invited woman rider Triple-S 2015
