= Christophe Tack =

Belgian kitesurfer

Christophe Tack (born 29 December 1992) is the 2014 World Champion Freestyle Kitesurfer.

He first started kitesurfing when he was 10, and has been a professional since 2009, when he won an event on the Junior World Championship Tour. He is supported by Liquid Force, and has been involved in producing the Liquid Force Hifi X, and in 2016 the Element board will feature a pro model graphics design ridden by Tack. In 2020, he switched to Naish Kiteboarding. In 2010, Tack became Belgian senior champion for the first time, and ended the season in 4th place on the European rankings. He progressed then to the World Tour, ending 12th in 2011, 6th in 2012 and 3rd in 2013, when he also won a World Tour event for the first time, in Pingtan. In 2014 he became World Champion as leader of the end-of-year world rankings, having won 4 of the 9 first events and finishing 2nd a further 3 times.
