= Bruno Sroka =

French kitesurfer

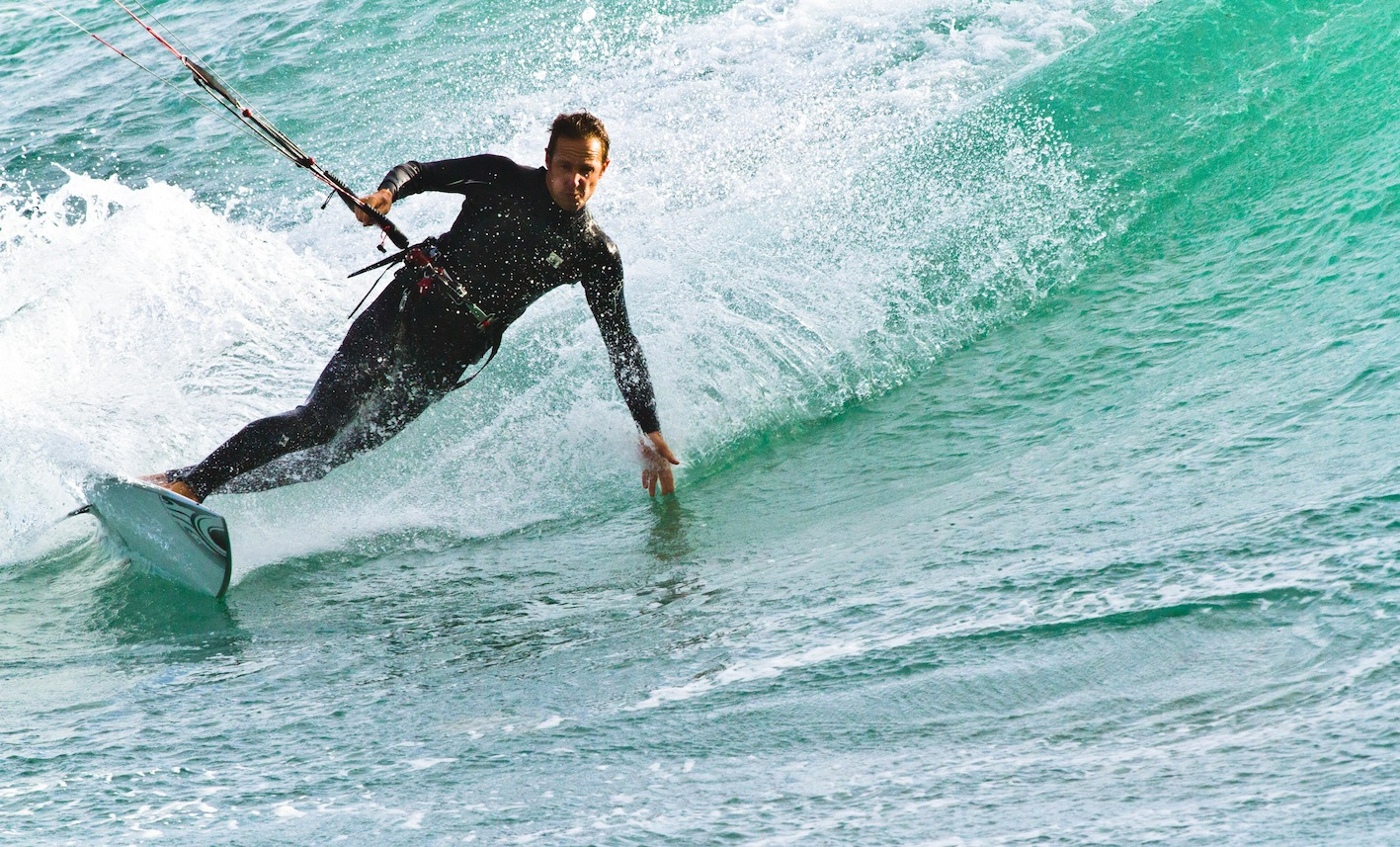
- Born: 9 June 1976 (age 50)
- Occupation: Professional Kitesurfer

Bruno Sroka (born 9 June 1976) is a French kitesurfer. Born in Clamart, Sroka began windsurfing when he was two years old. In 1998, Sroka arrived in Brest and took up kitesurfing, intrigued by the new sport. He had a successful career and went on to achieve many titles, becoming a three-time World Cup champion. Sroka also broke several milestones in the sport: he became the first to kitesurf the Cape Horn in 2008 and from France to Ireland in 2013.

== Biography ==
Bruno Sroka was born in Clamart, France on 9 June 1976 to Edouard and Monique Sroka. His childhood idol was the French windsurfer Arnaud de Rosnay. Sroka's family is passionate about sports. Sroka began windsurfing when he was two years old, on the French Riviera, under the supervision of his parents and older brother Christophe. As a child, he sailed near Courseulles-sur-Mer and developed his windsurfing technique.

Sroka obtained a Certificat d'aptitude au professorat d'éducation physique et sportive (CAPEPS) (transl. Certificate of Aptitude for Teaching Physical Education and Sports) with his sixth attempt, enabling him to teach swimming and sailing. He arrived in Brest in 1998 to finish his studies. While he was there, Sroka was intrigued by the new sport of kitesurfing and took it up the same year. He also began working at the sports shop where Manu Bertin, a pioneer of kitesurfing in France, stores his equipment. He was one of the few competitive kitesurfers from Brest in 1999. In 2001 and 2002, Sroka finished second for France in freestyle. He also won second place in the 2004 Kiteboard Pro World Tour (monde vagues).

He was a speed crossing French champion in 2005, 2006, 2007 and also in 2005 he obtained his Master diploma from Brest University, Bretagne. In 2007 Sroka won three kitesurfing titles of the year: French Champion, European Champion and World Champion. In 2009 he was one of the two competitors that won both the PKRA and KPWT tours and became a winner of IKA World Cup ranking. In 2010 Sroka carried on with the IKA World Cup title and finished 3rd in the World Championship in addition to the European Championship and European Cup. In 2011 he won third place in the World Slalom Championship (Murcia, Spain) and placed third in the European Championship in course racing in Sopot, Poland.

=== Non-competitive milestones ===
On 7 April 2008, Sroka became the first to kitesurf the Cape Horn. He kited for over nine hours non-stop.

On 17 May 2012, Sroka claimed the record for the fastest time to kitesurf the English Channel, in 4 hours and 45 minutes.

On 19 July 2013, Sroka became the first person to kitesurf from France to Ireland. He completed the 240 nautical miles (440 km) in 16 hours and 37 minutes, starting from the Penn Enez beach in Aber Wrac'h, Brittany, and ending in Crosshaven, Cork Harbour. Sroka planned to kitesurf the Mediterranean Sea in 2014 and the Atlantic Ocean in 2015.

== Advocacy ==
In January 2009, Sroka crossed the Gulf of Aqaba with a blue dove on his sail a day after the Gaza War ceasefires. In May 2011, Sroka showed his support for Hervé Ghesquière and Stéphane Taponier, two French journalists held hostage in Afghanistan, by kitesurfing the Pointe du Raz in Brittany with their portraits attached to his sail. It marked five hundred days of their captivity.

Bruno Sroka is an active member in multiple organizations and foundations, advocating for a "cleaner and safer planet." Sroka is an ambassador for the Peace and Sport, Green Cross and UNSS (union national du sport scolaire) foundations.

== Personal life ==
Sroka has been in a relationship with a Lithuanian woman named Deimantina Juskeviciute since 2010.
