= Leading edge inflatable kite =

Single skin kite with inflatable bladders providing structure

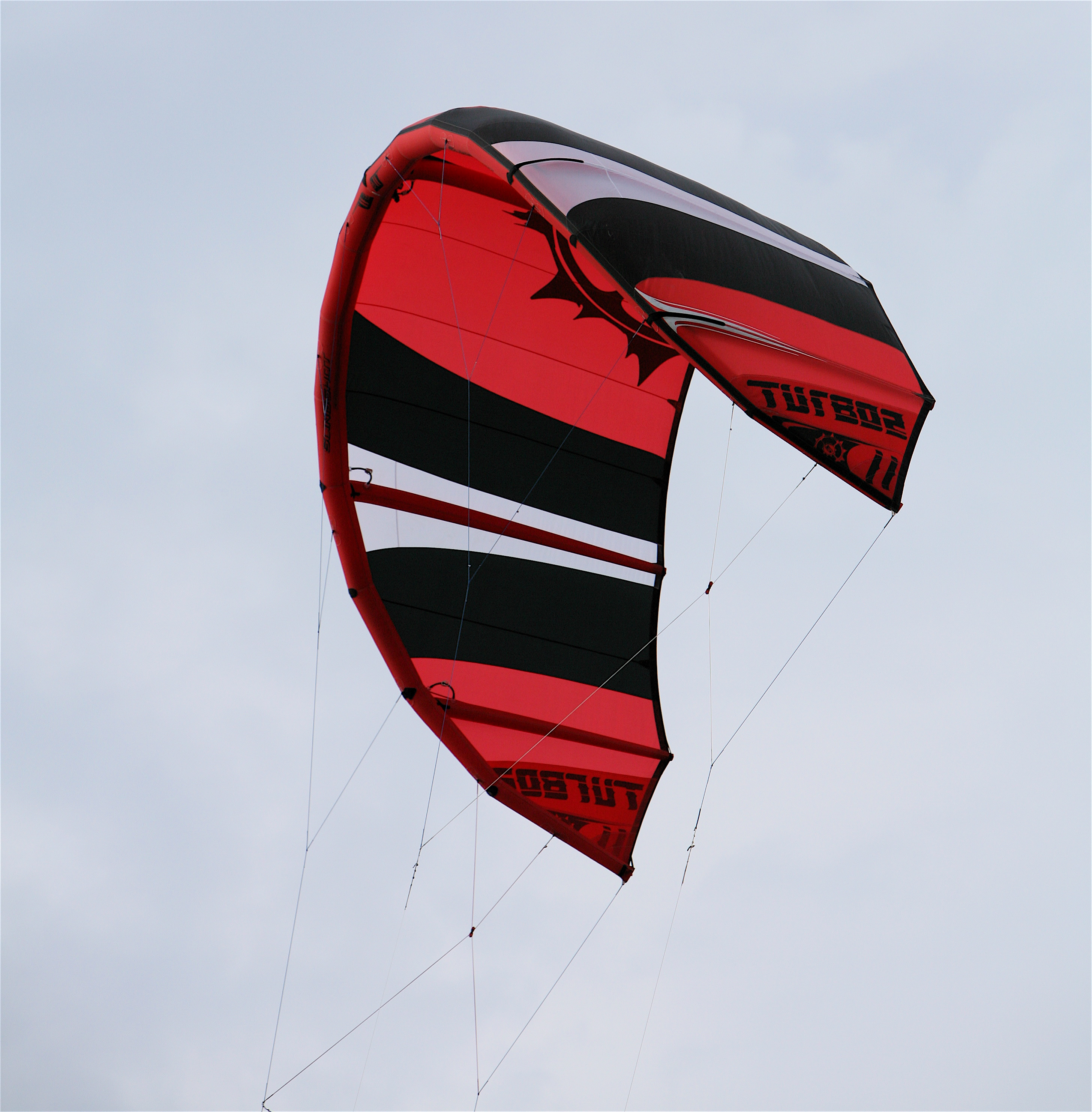
A leading edge inflatable bow kite

Diagram of LEI Kite

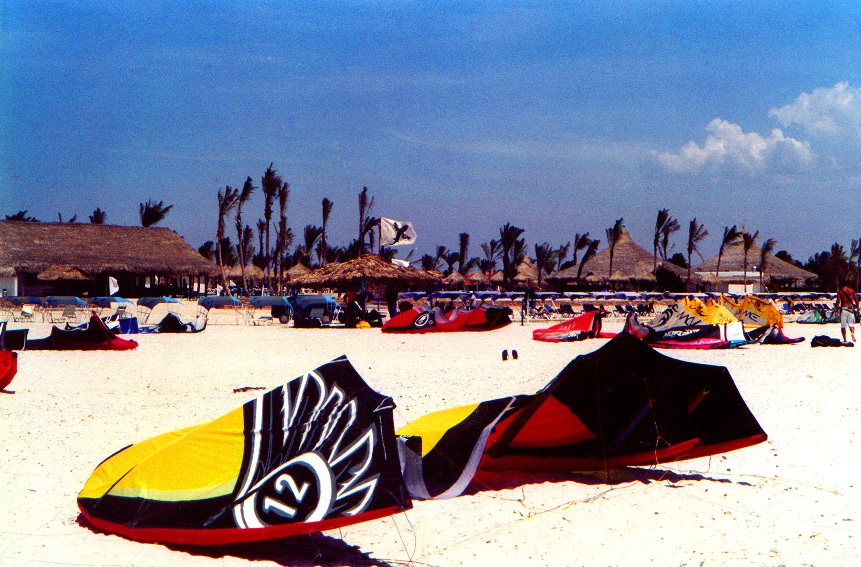
Leading edge inflatable kite on a beach at Coche, Venezuela

A leading edge inflatable kite (LEI) is a single skin kite with inflatable bladders providing structure. It is useful as a power or traction kite. These kites are flown using 2, 4 or 5 control lines and a bar. (See also: kite control systems) A LEI is a great kite for water use because the inflated bladders cause it to float on the water surface. A LEI can sit on the water for an indefinite time and still be relaunched because, unlike a foil kite, there are no chambers that can fill with water. Generally used for kitesurfing and kiteboarding, leading edge inflatable kites come in many different sizes, most commonly from 5 to 18 square metres.

Based on their design Leading Edge Inflatable kites can be broken down into four categories: C-kites, hybrid kites, delta kites, and bow kites.

== C-kites ==
C-kites are the oldest style of LEI used for traction kiting. They typically come with four lines, and some have the option of an additional 5th line for safety and easy relaunching. The main difference between C-kites and other LEI styles is that they do not have any lines that support the leading edge of the kite (called bridles). The lines on a C-kite attach to the four corners of the kite. Hybrid kites, together with bow kites and later delta kites are all subtypes of a SLE-kite (Supported Leading Edge), defined by having a bridle which supports the leading edge. C-kites are the preferred kite of wake-style kiteboarders.

== SLE sub-types ==
=== Bow kites ===
All of the Bow kite's advantages are because of its concave trailing edge. This design feature changes the shape of the kite's trailing edge as it flies, requiring that the leading edge flatten to match, resulting in a much flatter looking kite. The bridles on the kite restrict the leading edge and hold it in line with the rest of the kite. In addition, the concave trailing edge enables the kite to be sheeted out further than a traditional C- kite, which is why a Bow kite can be nearly 100% depowered.

The inflatable and bow kite designs were invented by Dominique and Bruno Legaignoux.

=== Hybrid kites ===
Hybrid kites are a cross between C-kites and bow kites. Like bow kites, they incorporate bridles to support their leading edge. These bridles support the kite and enable designers to experiment with different arc profiles - some Hybrids can have a very flat arc, while some can look similar to a C-kite. Individual characteristics of the Hybrid kites vary depending on how similar they represent one of the other two kite styles. The defining difference between a Hybrid and Bow kite is the shape of the trailing edge. The trailing edge on a Hybrid kite is convex, whereas that of a Bow is concave.

=== Delta kites ===
Delta kites are a refinement of the hybrid design. Their shape (when flattened out) is more triangular, which places more of the kite's canopy in the middle. This increases the amount of "projected area" that is exposed to the wind, resulting in more power. These kites still use a bridle (though often extremely simplified), and so could still be called SLE kites. (They are often called C-shaped, but they are not C-kites as they are traditionally known.) Delta C-kites are a new breed of hybrid which combines the high-performance of a C-kite with the depowerable fast-turning triangular Delta kites.

== See also ==
- List of inflatable manufactured goods
