= Bruna Kajiya =

Brazilian kitesurfer

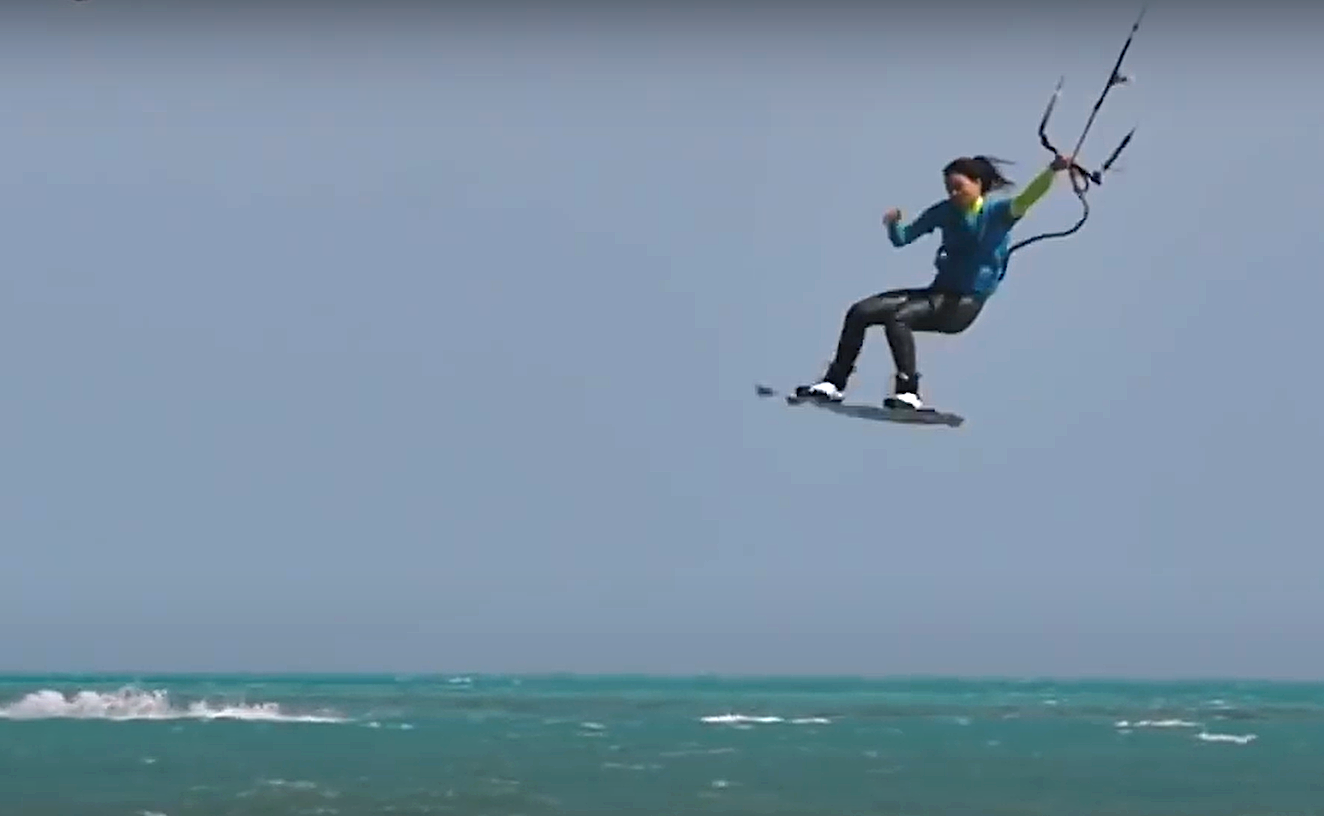
- Kajiya in 2016

Personal information
- Nationality: Brazilian
- Born: February 25, 1987 (age 39)

Sport
- Country: Brazil
- Sport: Kiteboarding
- Team: North, Mystic
- Turned pro: 2005

Bruna Kajiya (born 25 February 1987) is a Brazilian professional kiteboarder. She is a six-time Vice World Champion and a three-time World Champion Freestyle (2009, 2016, and 2017) in the World Kiteboarding League (WKL). In 2018, the WKL was replaced by the Global Kitesports Association (GKA) which became the official Kite Surfing World Title organization. In 2019, Bruna was the GKA Vice World Freestyle Champion, giving her her sixth Vice World Championship Title. In 2016, Bruna was the first woman to land a "Backside 315", a trick that combines a 540 degree rotation and double handle-pass.

Bruna is originally from Ilhabela where she competed as a swimmer from an early age, earning the nickname "Little Fish." Following a surfing accident, she sought out a new sport and discovered wakestyle kiteboarding while studying in Maui.

Bruna is sponsored by Red Bull, Mystic and North Kiteboarding.
