= Kiteboarding =

Extreme sport

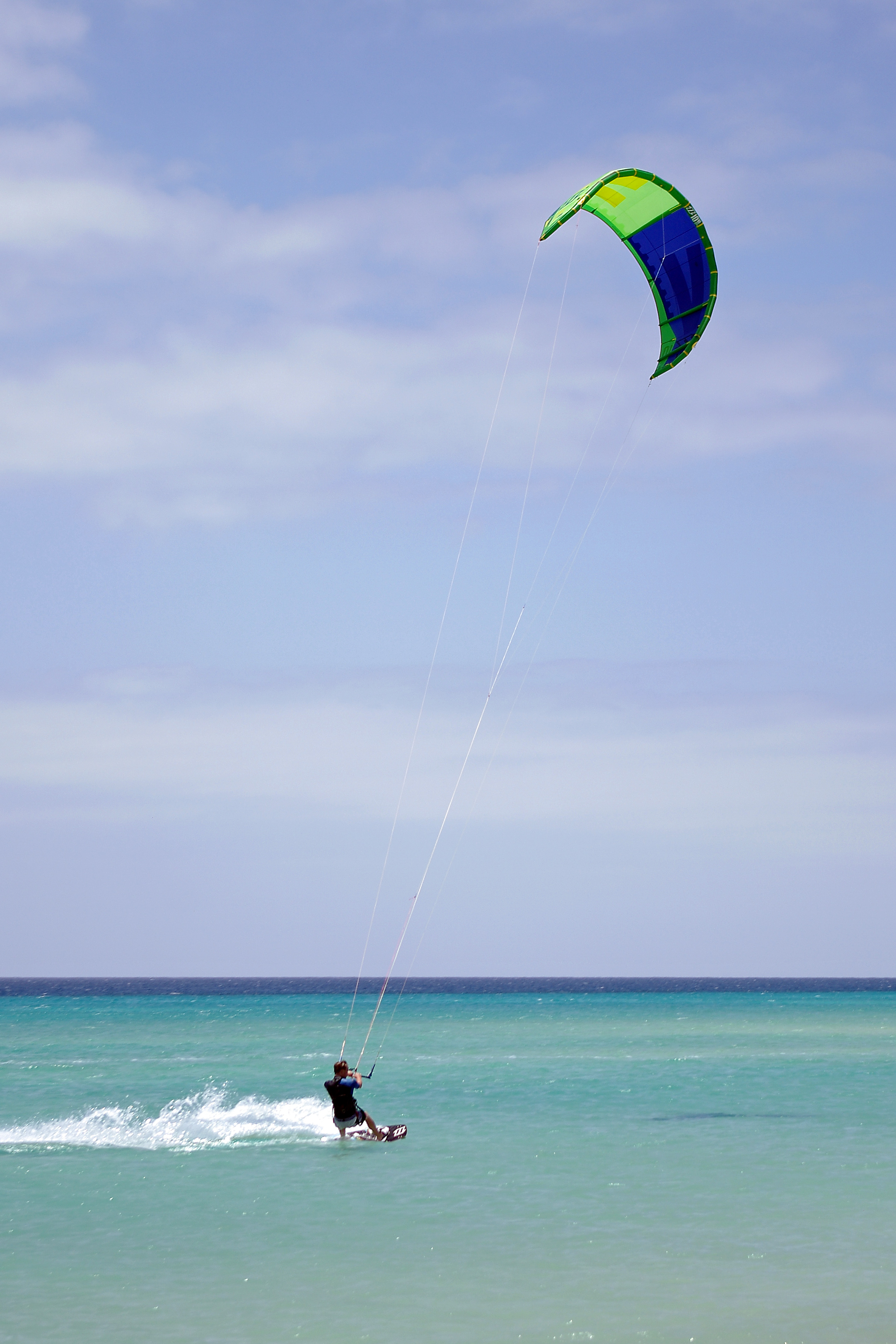
A kiteboarder being pulled across the water by a power kite

Kiteboarding or kitesurfing is a sport that involves using wind power with a large power kite to pull a rider across a water, land, snow, sand, or other surface. It combines the aspects of paragliding, surfing, windsurfing, skateboarding, snowboarding, and wakeboarding. Kiteboarding is among the less expensive and more convenient sailing sports.

While similar, kiteboarding and kitesurfing are different in the sense that kitesurfing uses a directional board meant to ride and carve waves, whereas kiteboarding uses a twin-tip board and more meant for tricks and flips.

A person kiteboarding in Kanagawa, Japan in 2022

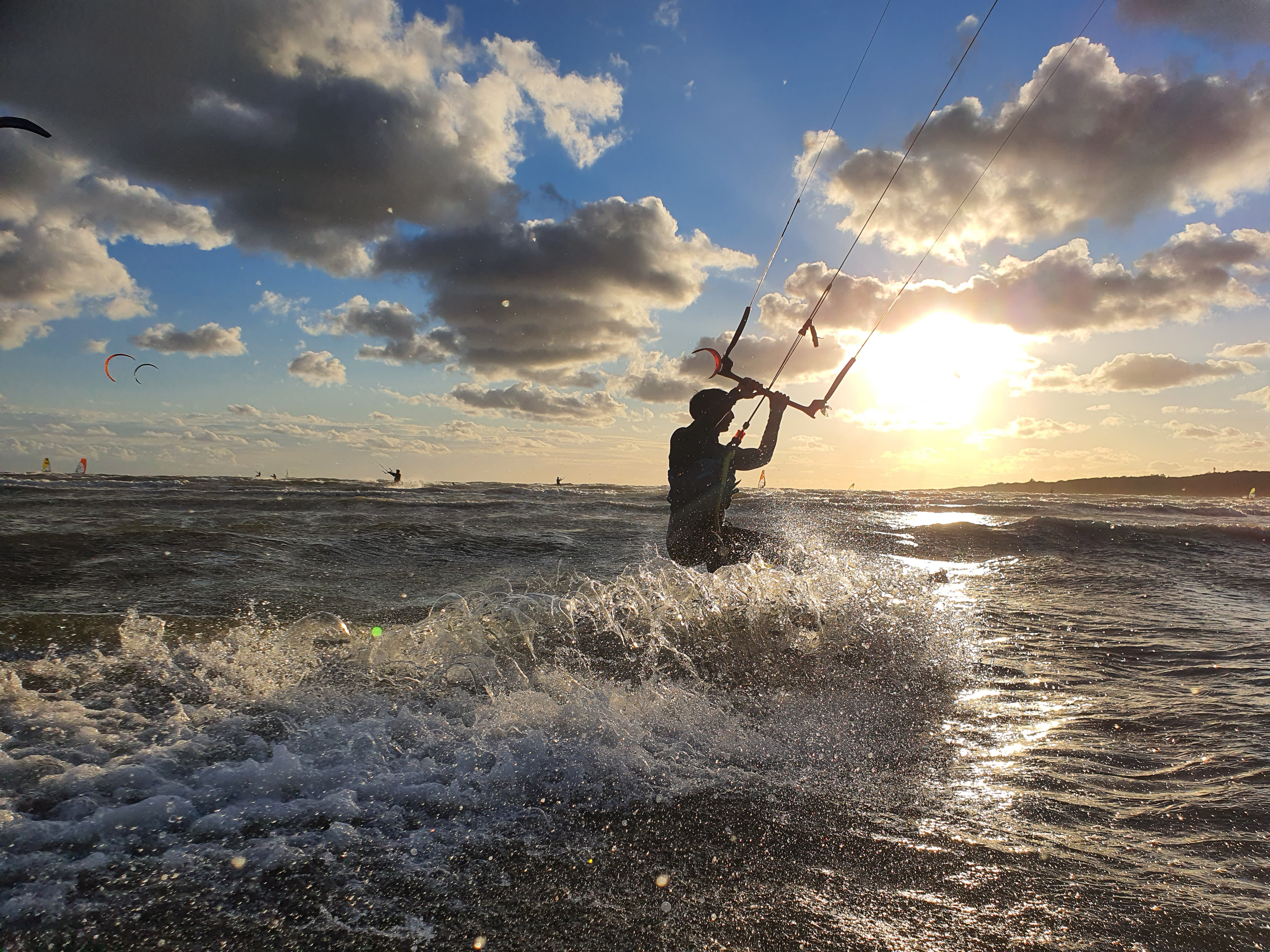
A person kiteboarding in Varberg, Sweden in 2022

After some concepts and designs that emerged in the late 1970s and early 1980s were successfully tested, the sport received a wider audience in the late 1990s and became mainstream at the turn of the century. It has freestyle, wave-riding, and racing competitions. The sport held the speed sailing record, reaching 55.65 kn (103.06 km/h) before being eclipsed by the 65.45 kn (121.21 km/h) Vestas Sailrocket. Worldwide, there are 1.5 million kitesurfers, while the industry sells around 100,000 to 150,000 kites per year.

Most power kites are leading-edge inflatable kites or foil kites attached by about 20 m (66 ft) of flying lines to a control bar and a harness. The kitesurfer rides on either a bidirectional board (a "twin-tip", similar to a wakeboard), a directional surfboard, or a foil board. They often wear a wetsuit in mild to cold waters. In the early days of the sport, there were significant injuries and some fatalities, but the safety record has improved with better equipment and instruction.

== History ==
=== Late 20th century ===
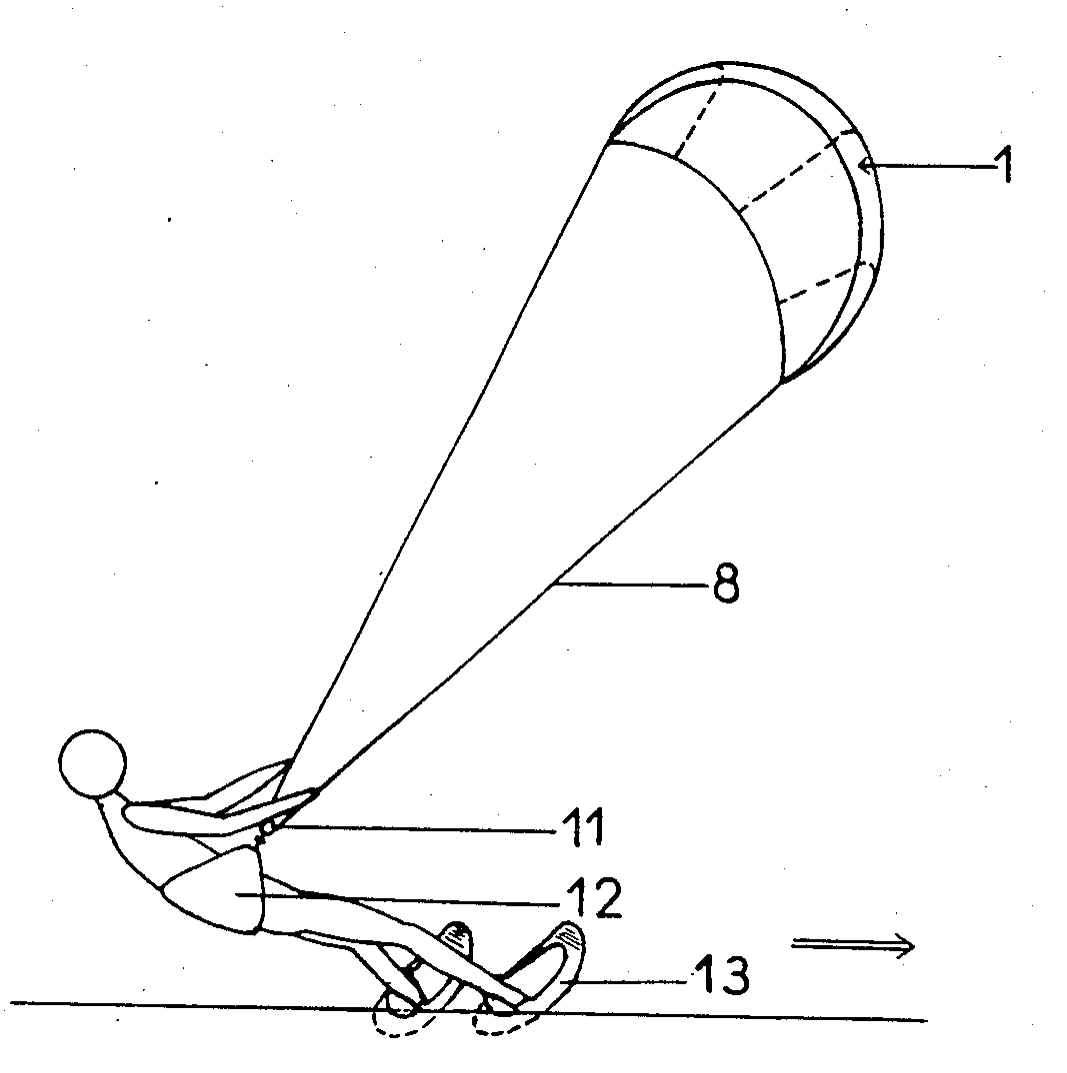
1984 patent of the Legaignoux brothers

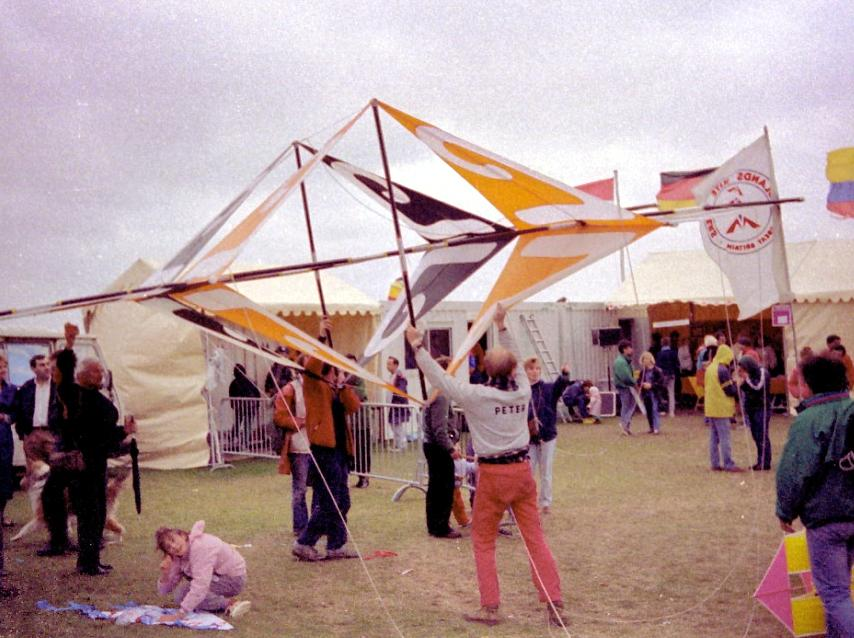
Peter Lynn lifting a kite in Dieppe, September 1988

In October 1977 Gijsbertus Adrianus Panhuise (Netherlands) received the first patent for KiteSurfing. The patent covers, specifically, a water sport using a floating board of a surfboard type where a pilot standing up on it is pulled by a wind-catching device of a parachute type tied to his harness on a trapeze-type belt.

Through the 1980s, there were occasionally successful attempts to combine kites with canoes, ice skates, snow skis, water skis and roller skates.

Throughout the 1970s and early 1980s, Dieter Strasilla from Germany developed parachute-skiing and later perfected a kite-skiing system using self-made paragliders and a ball-socket swivel allowing the pilot to sail upwind and uphill but also to take off into the air at will. Strasilla and his Swiss friend Andrea Kuhn also used this invention in combination with surfboards and snowboards, grasskies, and self-made buggies. One of his patents describes in 1979 the first use of an inflatable kite design for kitesurfing.

Two brothers, Bruno Legaignoux and Dominique Legaignoux, from the Atlantic coast of France, developed kites for kitesurfing in the late 1970s and early 1980s and patented an inflatable kite design in November 1987, a design that has been used by companies to develop their own products.

Bill Roeseler, a Boeing aerodynamicist, and his son Cory Roeseler patented the "KiteSki" system, which consisted of water skis powered by a two-line, delta style kite, controlled via a bar-mounted combined winch/brake. The KiteSki was commercially available in 1994. The kite had a rudimentary water launch capability and could go upwind. In 1995, Cory Roeseler visited Peter Lynn at New Zealand's Lake Clearwater in the Ashburton Alpine Lakes area, demonstrating the speed, balance, and upwind angle on his 'ski'. In the late 1990s, Cory's ski evolved into a single board similar to a surfboard.

The development of modern-day kitesurfing by the Roeselers in the United States and the Legaignoux in France was carried on in parallel with that of buggying.

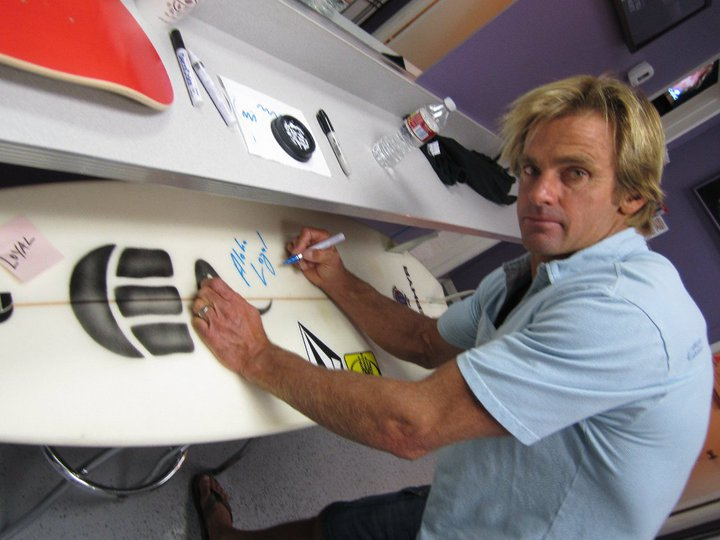
Laird Hamilton demonstrated kitesurfing in 1996

In 1996, Laird Hamilton and Manu Bertin were instrumental in demonstrating and popularising kitesurfing off the coast of Maui, while, in Florida, Raphaël Baruch changed the name of the sport from flysurfing to kitesurfing by starting and promoting the first commercial brand of the industry: "Kitesurf".

In 1997, the Legaignoux brothers developed and sold the breakthrough "Wipika" kite design that had a structure of preformed inflatable tubes and a simple bridle system to the wingtips, both of which greatly assisted water re-launch. Bruno Legaignoux continued to improve kite designs, including developing the bow kite design, which has been licensed to many kite manufacturers.

In 1997, specialized kiteboards were developed by Raphaël Salles and Laurent Ness. By the end of 1998 kitesurfing had become an extreme sport, distributed and taught through shops and schools worldwide. The first competition was held on Maui in September 1998 and was won by Flash Austin.

Starting in 1999, kitesurfing became a mainstream sport with the entry of key windsurfing manufacturers, namely Robby Naish and Neil Pryde. Single direction boards derived from windsurfing and surfing designs became the dominant form of kiteboard.

=== 21st century ===
In 2000, a new freestyle competition, sponsored by Red Bull was launched in Maui. The competition, named Red Bull King of the Air, judged riders on height, versatility, and style. The competition is still held annually in Cape Town, South Africa.

From 2001 onward, twin-tip bi-directional boards became more popular for most flat water riders, with directional boards still in use for surf conditions.

In May 2012, the course racing style of kitesurfing was announced as a sport for the 2016 Rio Olympics, replacing windsurfing. However, after a vote by the General Assembly of the ISAF in November 2012, the RSX windsurfer was reinstated for both Men and Women, resulting in kitesurfing being left out. The ISAF mid-year meeting of May 2013 proposed seeking an eleventh medal to include kitesurfing in 2020 without making any changes to existing events.

In 2014, course-racing kiteboarding was included in the ISAF World Sailing World Cup program. In November 2014, 20 athletes attended the final competition in Abu Dhabi. The first place among women was taken by Elena Kalinina, while the men's champion was Great Britain's Oliver Bridge.

In 2015, Elena Kalinina won again and received the title of the world champion, ahead of Great Britain's Steph Bridge and the Russian Anastasia Akopova. The world champion among men was Maxime Nocher from Monaco, making him the youngest world champion, ahead of Oliver Bridge and Polish native Blazek Ozog.

Kitesurfing was named an official event at the 2018 Summer Youth Olympics in Buenos Aires.

Mixed Kite - Formula Kite was chosen by World Sailing for inclusion in the 2024 Summer Olympics.

== Kitesurfing records ==
=== Jump records (height, length, time) ===
On August 8, 2023 South African athlete Joshua Emanuel ascended 36.2 meters in the North Sea near Hanstholm, riding the CORE XR Pro 7m kite. The previous record holder for the height of a single jump was Jamie Overbeek at 35.3m. Nick Jacobsen achieved a previous world record for the highest kite jump, measured by WOO Sports on February 19, 2017 in Cape Town, South Africa, during a session with 40-knot winds. Jacobsen's jump reached 28.6 meters high, with an airtime of 8.5 seconds. The record has been broken several times since then, and WOO Sports maintains jump-related leaderboards in different categories (airtime, height, etc.) based on the data recorded and uploaded by its users.

Jesse Richman holds the record for hangtime at 22 seconds, set at Crissy Field in San Francisco, California. Airton Cozzolino holds the record for strapless hangtime at 19 seconds.

=== Speed records ===
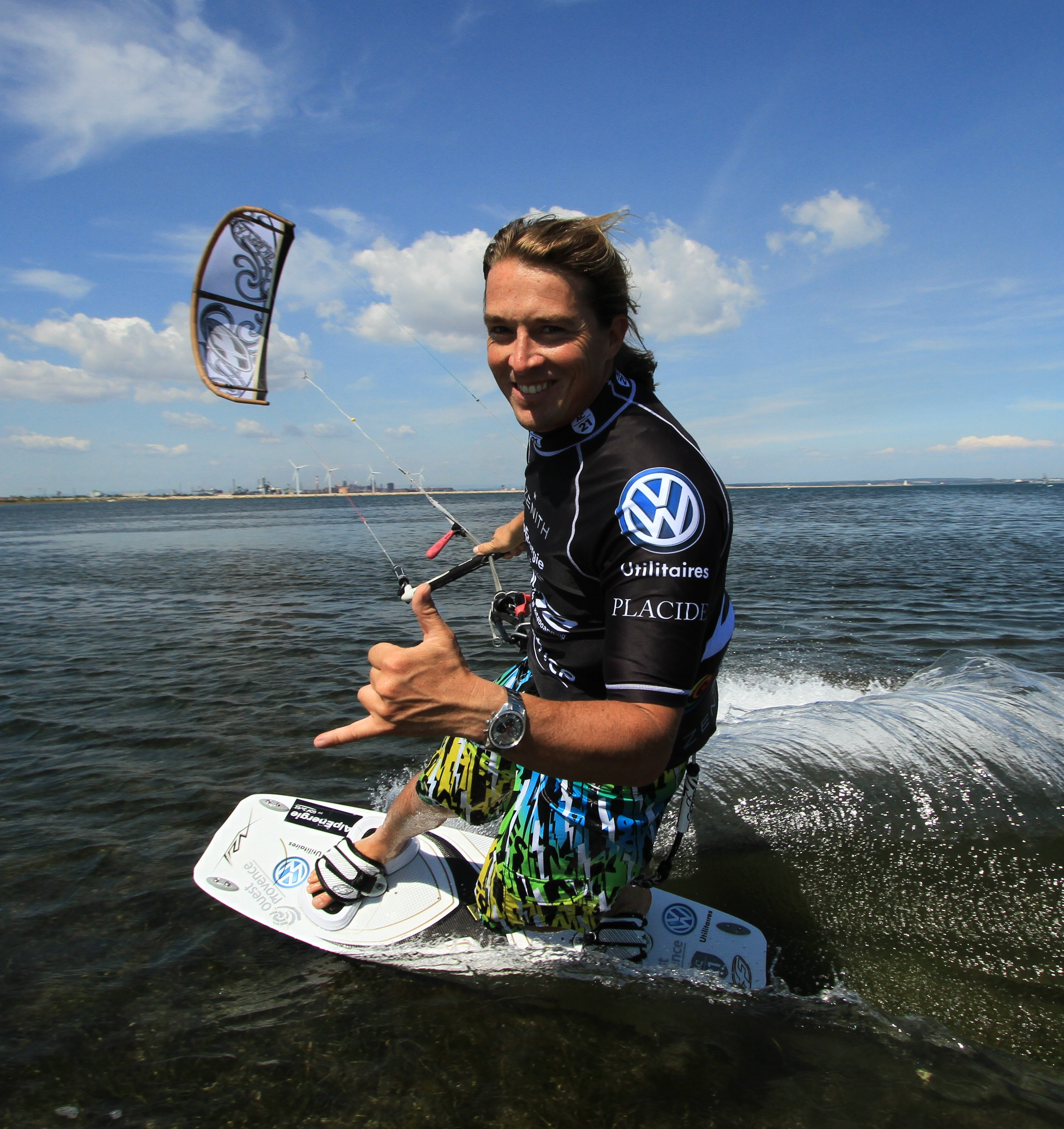
Alex Caizergues averaged 57.97 knots or 107.36 km/h over a 500m distance on 13 November 2017

French kitesurfer Sébastien Cattelan became the first sailor to break the 50 knots barrier by reaching 50.26 knots on 3 October 2008 at the Lüderitz Speed Challenge in Namibia. On 4 October, Alex Caizergues (also of France) broke this record with a 50.57 knots run. Similar speeds have been reached in the same location by windsurfers Anders Bringdal and Antoine Albeau, respectively 50.46 and 50.59 knots. These speeds are verified, but are still subject to ratification by the World Sailing Speed Record Council. Earlier in the event, on 19 September, American Rob Douglas reached 49.84 knots (92.30 km/h), becoming the first kitesurfer to establish an outright world record in speed sailing. Previously the record was held only by sailboats or windsurfers. Douglas also became the world's third over-50 knots sailor, when on 8 October he made a 50.54 knots (93.60 km/h) run.

On 14 November 2009, Alex Caizergues completed another run of 50.98 knots in Namibia.

October 2010, Rob Douglas became the outright record holder for the short distance 500 meters with 55.65 knots. Sébastien Cattelan became the record holder of France and Europe with 55.49 and was the first rider to reach 55 knots.

On 13 November 2017, French rider Alex Caizergues became the new world speed record holder in France (Salin-de-Giraud) reaching 57.97 knots or 107.36 km/h.

=== Largest kitesurfing wave ===
While Nuno "Stru" Figueiredo held the record at 62-foot (19-meter) from a 2018 ride at Praia do Norte in Nazaré, Portugal, Patri McLaughlin set a new Guinness World Record on January 22, 2023 (72 feet and four inches (22.04 meters)).

=== Long distance ===
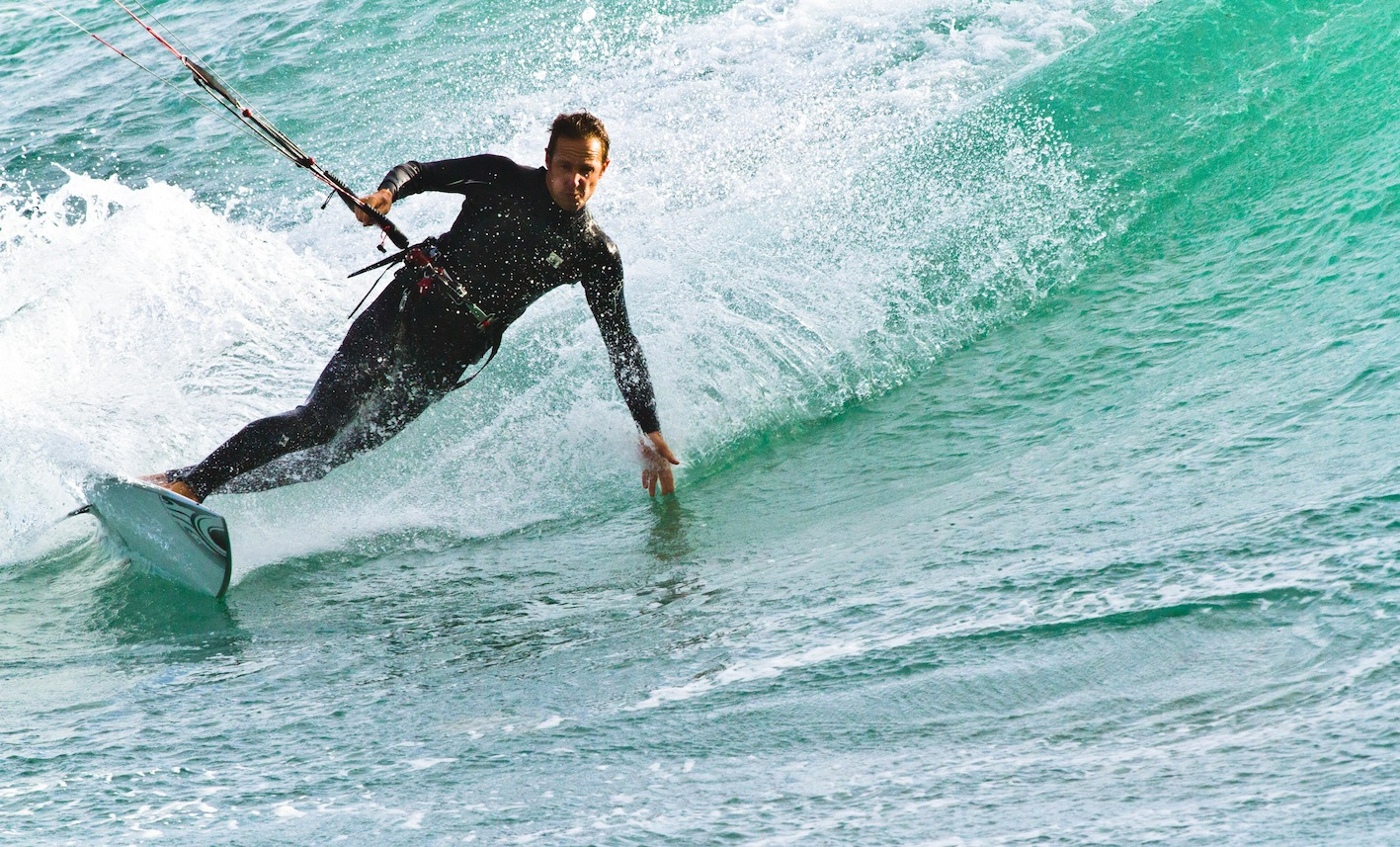
Bruno Sroka covered 444 km (240 nmi) between France and Ireland on 19 July 2013

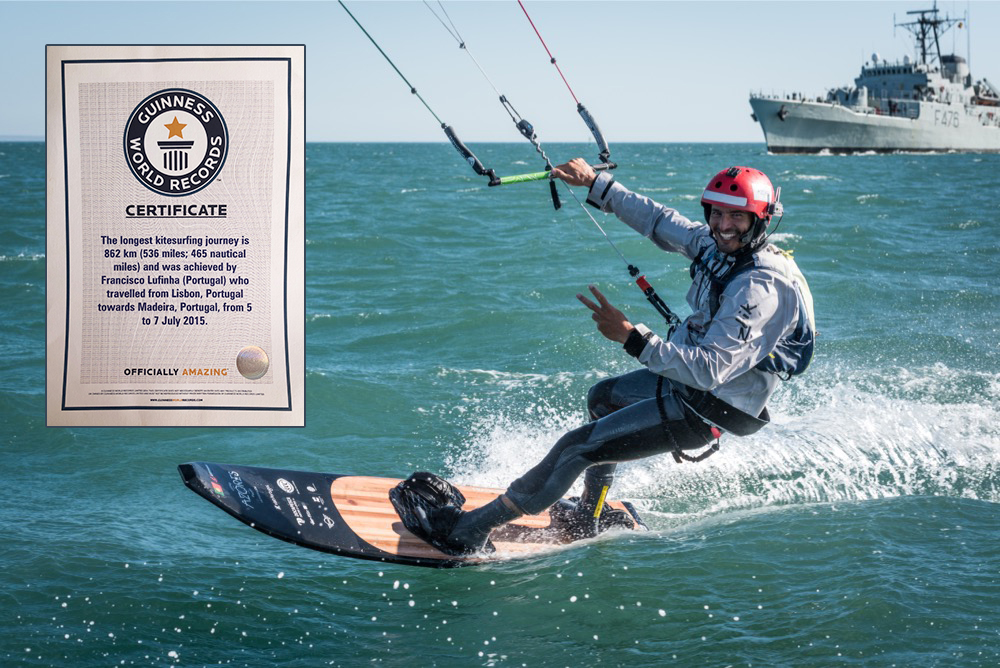
Francisco Lufinha covered 874 km (472 nmi) between Lisbon and Madeira on 7 July 2015

Date	length	description
2006-05-13	225 km (121 nmi)	Kirsty Jones, crossing solo from Lanzarote in the Canary Islands to Tarfaya, Morocco, in about nine hours
2007-07-24	207 km (112 nmi)	Raphaël Salles, Marc Blanc and Sylvain Maurain between Saint-Tropez and Calvi, Haute-Corse in 5h30 at 20 knots, beating Manu Bertin's previous record of 6h 30m for the same journey.
2008-10-12	419.9 km (226.7 nmi)	Eric Gramond crossing from Fortaleza to Parnaíba in Brazil during 24 hours
2010-03-22	240 km (130 nmi)	Natalie Clarke crossing Bass Strait from Stanley, Tasmania to Venus Bay, Victoria in Australia in 9h30
2010-05-10	369.71 km (199.63 nmi)	Phillip Midler (USA) from South Padre Island, Texas to Matagorda, Texas
2013-07-19	444 km (240 nmi)	Bruno Sroka between Aber Wrac'h, France and Crosshaven, Ireland
2013-09-18	569.5 km (307.5 nmi)	Francisco Lufinha from Porto to Lagos, Portugal
2015-07-07	874 km (472 nmi)	Francisco Lufinha from Lisbon to Madeira
2017-09-13	1,646 km (889 nmi)	Francisco Lufinha and Anke Brandt from Azores to Portugal Mainland

=== Notable journeys ===
Louis Tapper completed the longest recorded solo kite journey, completing 2000 km between Salvador and Sao Luis, Brazil. The journey was completed between July/August 2010 and took over 24 days of kitesurfing. This trip is also the longest solo journey, completed without a support crew, using one kite and a 35-liter backpack .

The previous longest recorded kite journey was by Eric Gramond who completed a 13-day trip of 1450 km along the coast of Brazil.

=== Bering Strait crossing ===
Constantin Bisanz, a 41-year-old Austrian, crossed an 80 km (50 mi) stretch of the Bering Strait, embarking from Wales, Alaska, US on 12 August 2011 at 04:00, and arriving in easternmost Russia two hours later, after which he returned by boat to Alaska. It occurred after 2 previously failed attempts, the first of which was on 28 July 2011, in which an incident occurred where he found himself floating in 36 °F water with no board, kite, or GPS unit for 1 hour before being rescued. On his second attempt on 2 August he and two friends sailed half the distance before turning around due to poor wind conditions.

=== Transatlantic crossing ===
A team of six kitesurfers, Filippo van Hellenberg Hubar, Eric Pequeno, Max Blom, Camilla Ringvold, Ike Frans, and Dennis Gijsbers crossed the Atlantic Ocean, from the Canary Islands to the Turks and Caicos Islands a distance of about 5,600 km (3,500 mi), from 20 November 2013, to 17 December 2013. Each of the six spent four hours each day surfing, broken into two sessions of two hours each, one during the day, and the other during the night.

== Environments ==
Kitesurfing on water includes freestyle and big air using a kiteboard similar to a wakeboard, kiting in waves using small surfboards with or without footstraps or bindings, foiling, and speed kiting.

Land kiting needs a short and light mountain board, feet steered buggies, rollerskates, or sand boards for sand kiteboarding, which is also referred to as "sand kiting". It is a suitable cross-training for kitesurfing as many of the mechanisms for kite control transfer to water use.

Skis or snowboards are used on snow for snowkiting.

== Market ==
In 2012, the number of kitesurfers was estimated by the ISAF and IKA at 1.5 million persons worldwide (pending review). The global market for kite gear sales was then worth US$250 million. The Global Kitesports Association (GKA) estimates 10% of the kitesurfers continue during winter. After substantial growth, activity was levelling by 2017 at around 85,000 kites sold yearly by GKA members, twintip boards sales decreased from 37,000 in 2013 to 28,000 in 2016 and directional boards from 8,000 to 7,000.

The largest manufacturers are Boards and More (previously under the North brand, now Duotone), then Cabrinha (Neil Pryde) with 25–35,000 kites a year each. They are followed by Naish, F-One, Core kiteboarding, Slingshot sports, Liquid Force, Airush, Ozone Kites, Flysurfer and others. The GKA recorded 100,000 kites sales in 2017 for its members, giving an estimated 140–150,000 total kites sales for 2017. Technavio predicted a global kiteboarding equipment market reaching US$2,120 million by 2021, growing at a CAGR of almost 9% from 2017.

== Governance ==
International kiteboarding has several promoting organizations and has undergone many changes in the governance of the sport, including long-lasting disputes between several of those entities, trying to negate each other the right to promote sporting events. The significance of the associated economic activity could explain part of such turbulence, but the intense rate of innovation and of adoption made it difficult to conceive, regulate and formalize the new competitions, and offer opportunities for new players specializing in new variants of the sport.

Some of those international organizations are (or were):

- The Professional Kiteboard Riders Association (PKRA), and the Kiteboard Pro World Tour (KPWT), both of which promoted several international tour competitions since 2002, however not as Kiting governing bodies.
- The Global Kitesports Association (GKA) - Industry association that federates several industry stakeholders organizers of competition world tours.
- The International Federation of Kitesports Organizations (IFKO), established in 2016 as a not-for-profit kiters association, covering also land and snow kiting, claiming to be the only legal kiting governing body over WS.
- The World Kiteboarding League (WKL) promoted freestyle competitions in 2017.
- The Kiteboarding Riders United (KRU) is an informal union of the professional kiteboarders, since 2016.
- The Kite Park League (KPL) is dedicated to international competitions in kiteboarding parks.
- The International Kiteboarding Association (IKA), based in Gibraltar, a company, not an association, created by World Sailing to unite kite national associations. Organizer of several racing events tours.
- World Sailing (WS), formerly the International Sailing Federation (ISAF), a private company that has promoted sail and boating since 1907. Since 2008, the WS claims to affiliate the IKA as its kiteboard racing body.

Several world cup events are sanctioned by the WS on behalf of the International Olympic Committee, a private association.

KPWT exchanged endorsements with IKA in 2009. Both become opposing parties as the IKA also got an agreement with PKRA. IKA threatened and banned riders who take part in competitions without its endorsement.

In 2015, the PKRA was sold to a group of investors, becoming the Virgin Kitesurfing World Championship (VKWC).

The WS itself has split the governance of its own events between the GKA for the expression disciplines and the IKA for the racing disciplines. The GKA has then split the expression disciplines, choosing to run the Wave and Strapless Tour themselves, while ceding to the World Kiteboarding League to run the freestyle events and the Kite Park League to run the park events. The freestyle events were then handed to the Kiteboarding Riders United (KRU).

== Styles ==
Several different kitesurfing styles are evolving, some of which cross over. Styles of kiteboarding include freestyle, freeride, speed, course racing, wakestyle, big air, park, and surfing.

Style	Description	Similar sports
Freeride	Freeride is any type of kiteboarding and the most popular kitesurfing style. Most boards sold are designed for freeride. It involves jumps, grabs and basic tricks. Twintip boards and kites with good relaunch and a wide wind range are commonly used.	
Freestyle	The kite and board are used to get big air (jumps) so that various tricks can be done while airborne. This style also used for competitive events and is free-format and "go anywhere". Smaller twintip boards and kites with good boost and hangtime are used.	
Wave-riding	Wave riding (kitesurfing) in waves is a style that combines kiteboarding with surfing. Locations with a wave break are required. Most kitesurfers use a directional board (either with or without foot straps) that has enough flotation and sufficient turning characteristics to surf the wave. Many kiters use a surfboard that can also be used for regular surfing (with the foot straps removed). The kitesurfer follows the kite when riding the wave, so the pull of the kite is reduced. This style is popular with surfers since it resembles tow-in surfing. Some riders ride waves unhooked, and without foot straps. Foot straps dictate the kitesurfer's foot position and how weight and pressure is applied to the board. Surfers (other than tow-in surfers) do not wear straps and are therefore free to move their feet and position their weight over a greater area of the board to match what is needed to flow with the wave. Kitesurfing using a board without foot straps is referred to as "riding strapless". This allows the kitesurfer's feet to move around the board for optimal performance. Kitesurfers using foot straps often use the power of the kite to position themselves on a wave and to control their board. That is, they rely on the kite for propulsion rather than the power of the wave to surf.	Surfing, tow-in surfing
Wakestyle	Wake-style is a crossover from wakeboarding with similar tricks and aerial maneuvers. Wake-style riders may also include tricks involving water obstacles such as ramps and rails as opposed to other styles that do not involve obstacles. Wake-style riders may also ride a board with bindings that more closely resembles a wakeboard than a more traditional twintip kiteboard with footstraps. Flat water is perfect for this style, and the use of big twintip boards with high rocker and wake booties is common. This style is commonly practiced by younger riders.	Wakeboarding
Jumping or Airstyle	Jumping, arguably a subset of Freeride, consists of jumping high to optionally perform tricks, sometimes also using kiteloops to get extra hang-time. Often shorter lines and smaller kites are used in stronger wind. C-kites and twintip boards are commonly used. An extension of this style is Big Air as pioneered by Ruben Lenten where riders go out in gale force conditions and perform high risk moves like kiteloops or more exactly megaloops.	—
Wakeskate	Wakeskaters use a strapless twintip type board covered with grip, similar to skateboard. Flat water and other conditions similar to Wakestyle.	Skateboarding
Course racing	These are racing events - like a yacht race along a course, that involve both speed and tactics. Special purpose directional race boards with long fins are used. Some raceboards resemble windsurfing boards. Foilboards are also now used. The goal is to outperform other kiters and come first in the race.	Windsurfing
Slalom	Performed with the same equipment like Course racing, this event is a downwind slalom course around buoys. Riders are often grouped in "heats", with the winners advancing into the next round.	Windsurfing
Speed racing	Speed racing is a style practiced at either formal race events or informally, usually with GPS units. Special purpose directional speed boards, or raceboards with long fins are used. The goal is travel at the maximum possible speed over 500 meters.	
Park Riding	Park riding resembles wakestyle. Riders use wakeboarding obstacles to perform tricks on them. Difficulty, execution and style	
Foiling	Foiling involves the attachment of a hydrofoil (foil) and mast to the base of a board. The foil allows the board to completely exit the water, thus freeing the rider from the impact of surface conditions. The extreme efficiency of a foil allows its rider to propel themselves with significantly less wind than those riding on the water's surface while greatly increasing upwind ability and speed. Different sizes and shapes of the wings on the foil allow one to optimize their boards for speed, stability, or waves.	

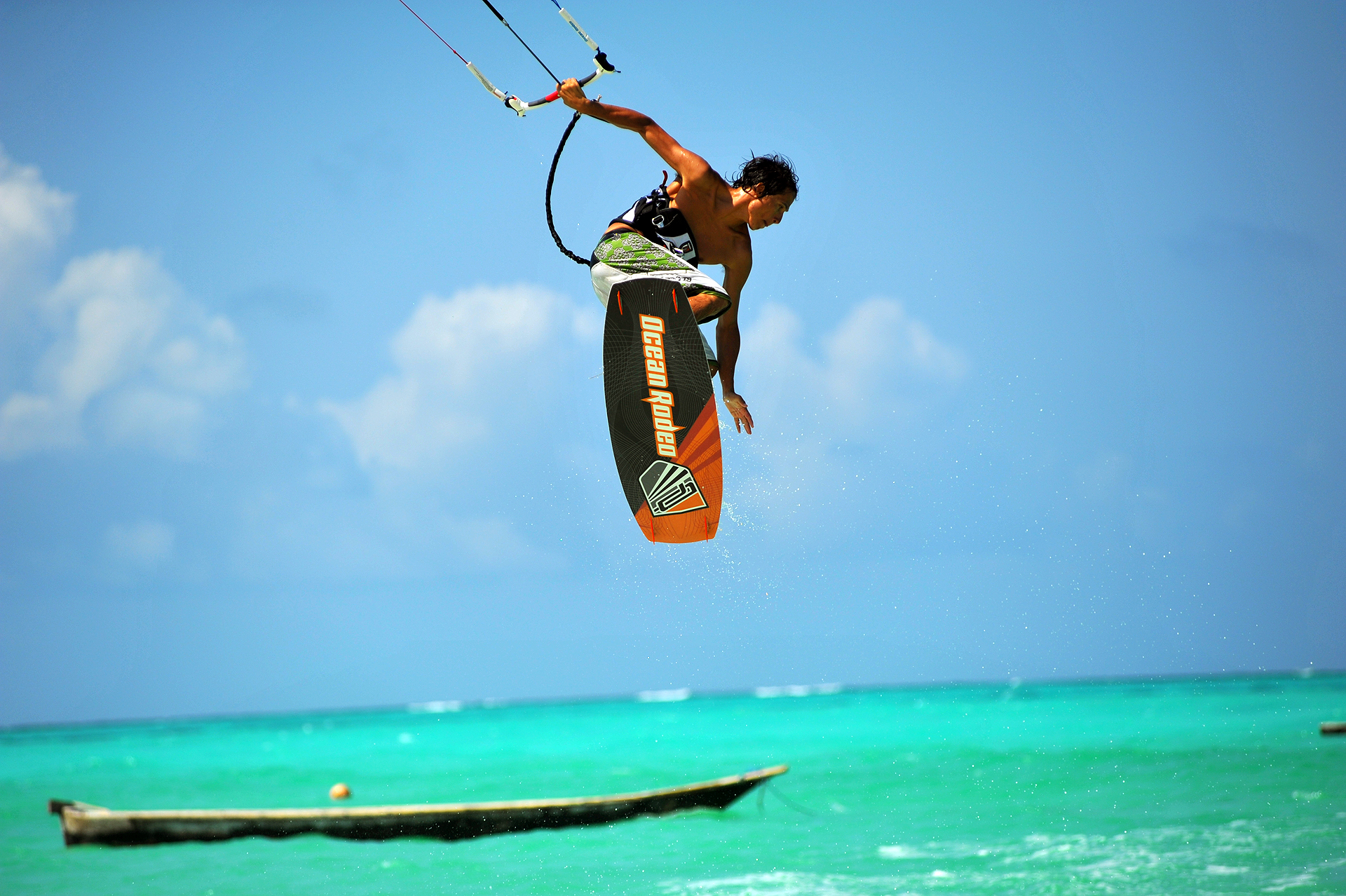
Unhooked freestyle

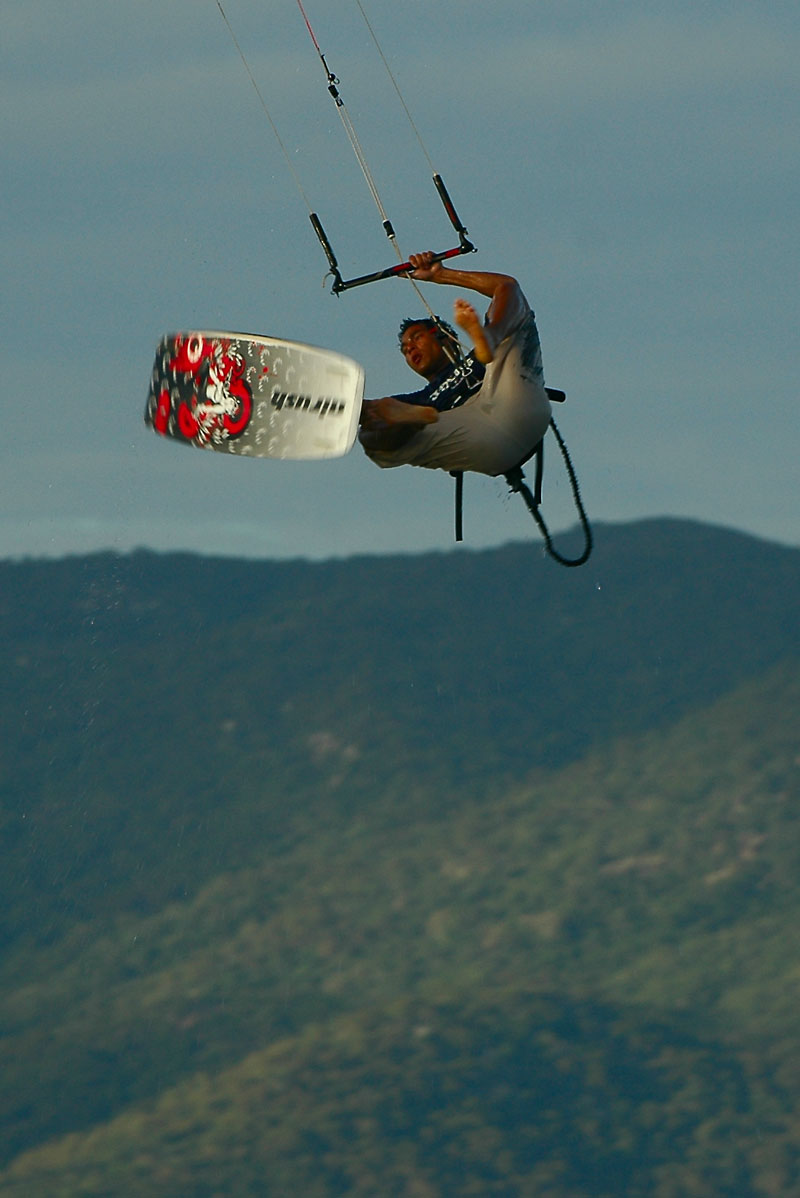
Board Off hooked-in freestyle

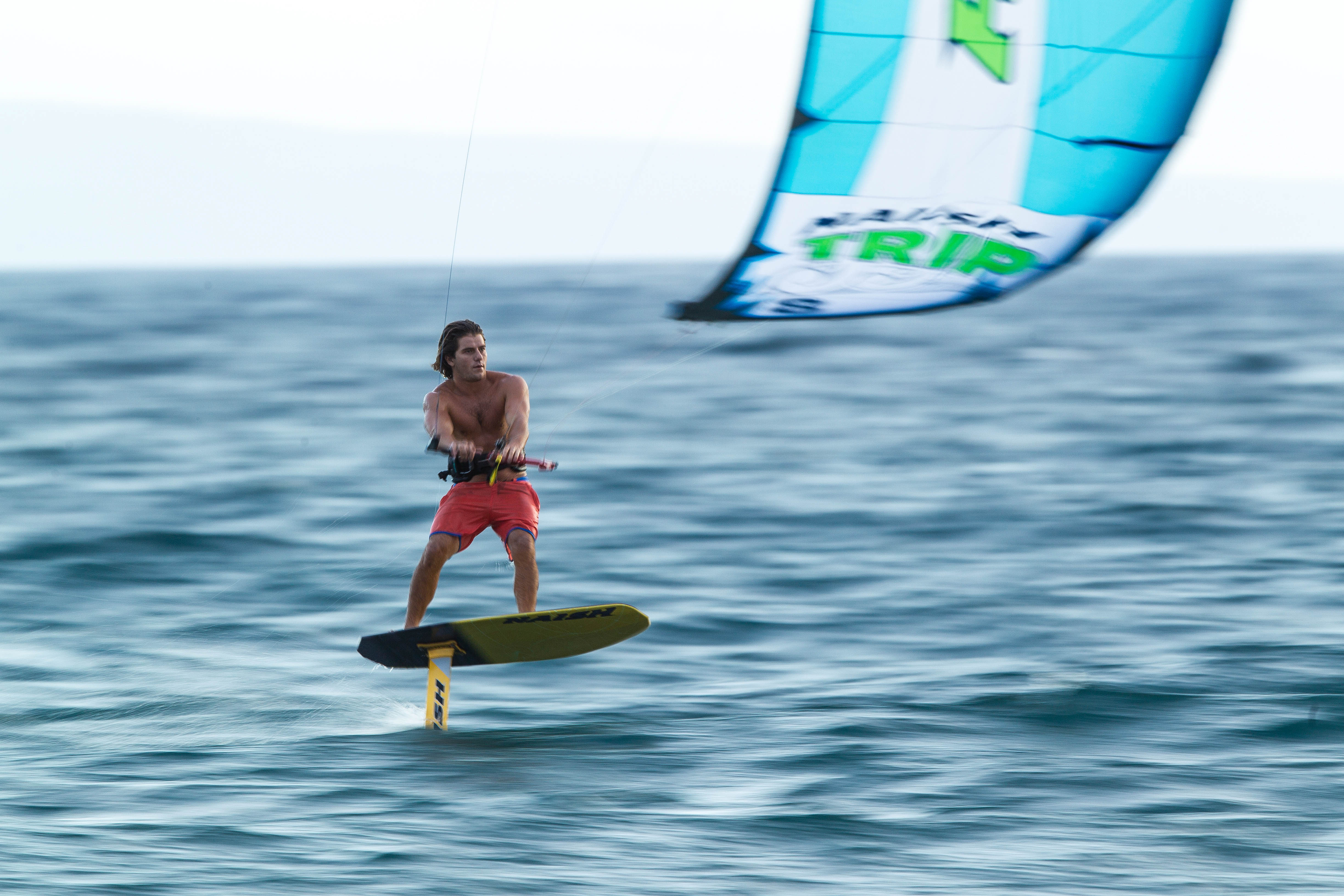
Foiling with a kite

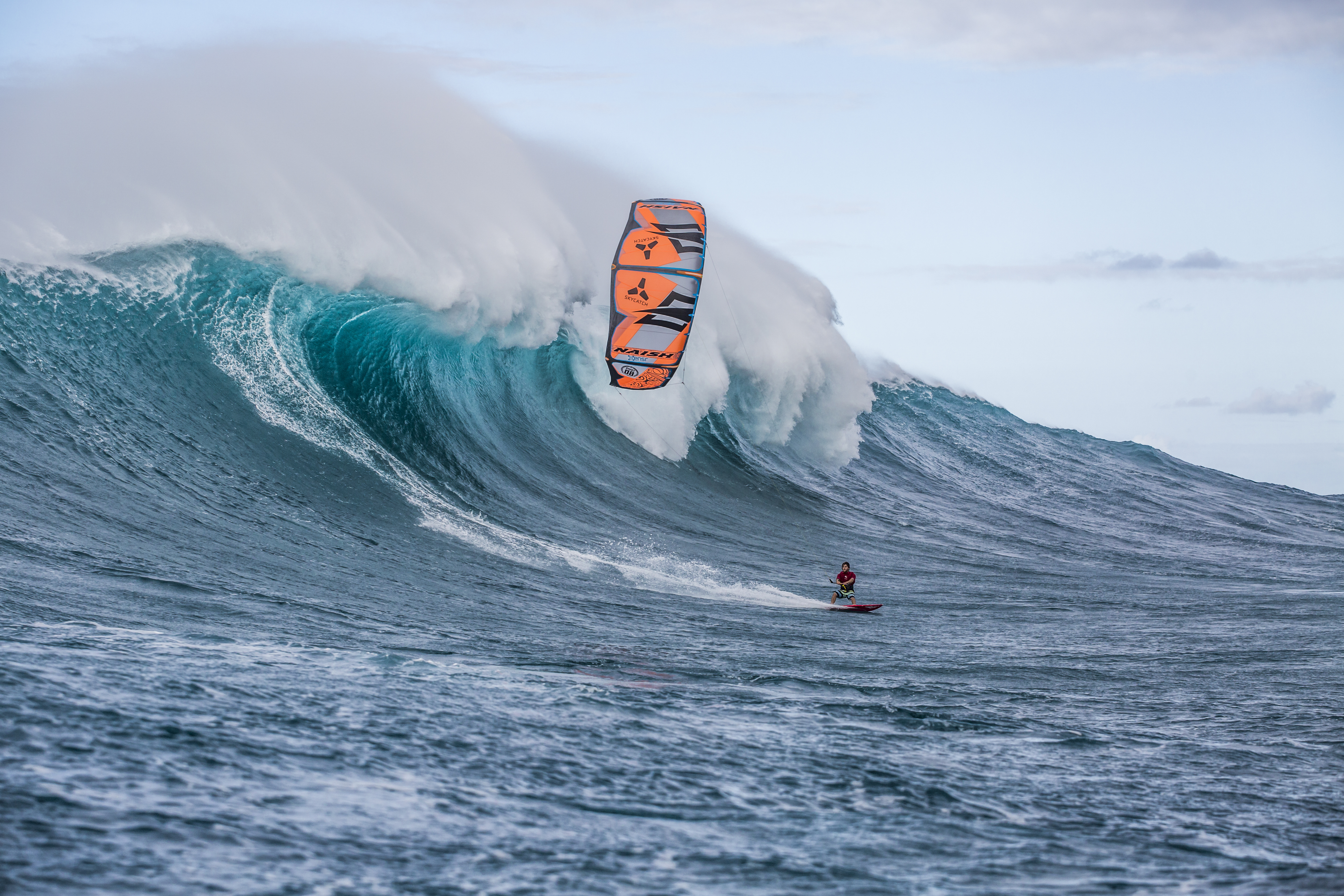
Wave-riding

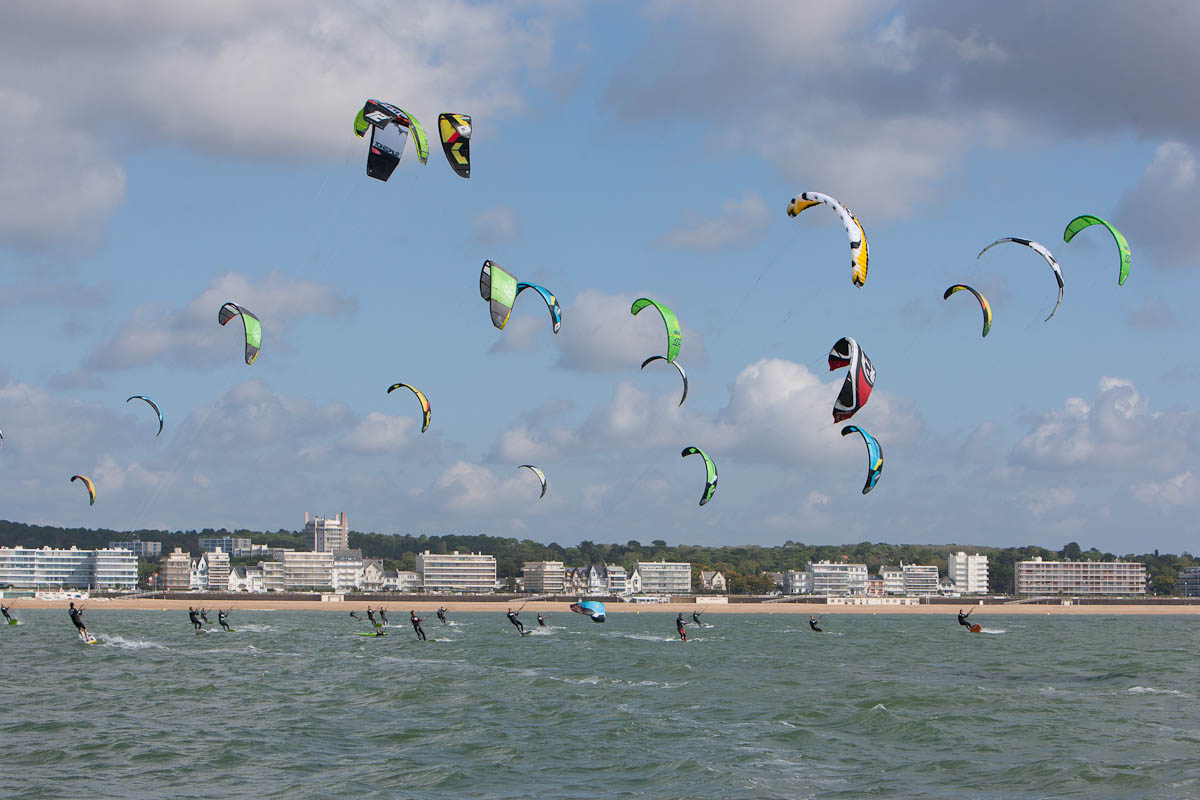
Course racing

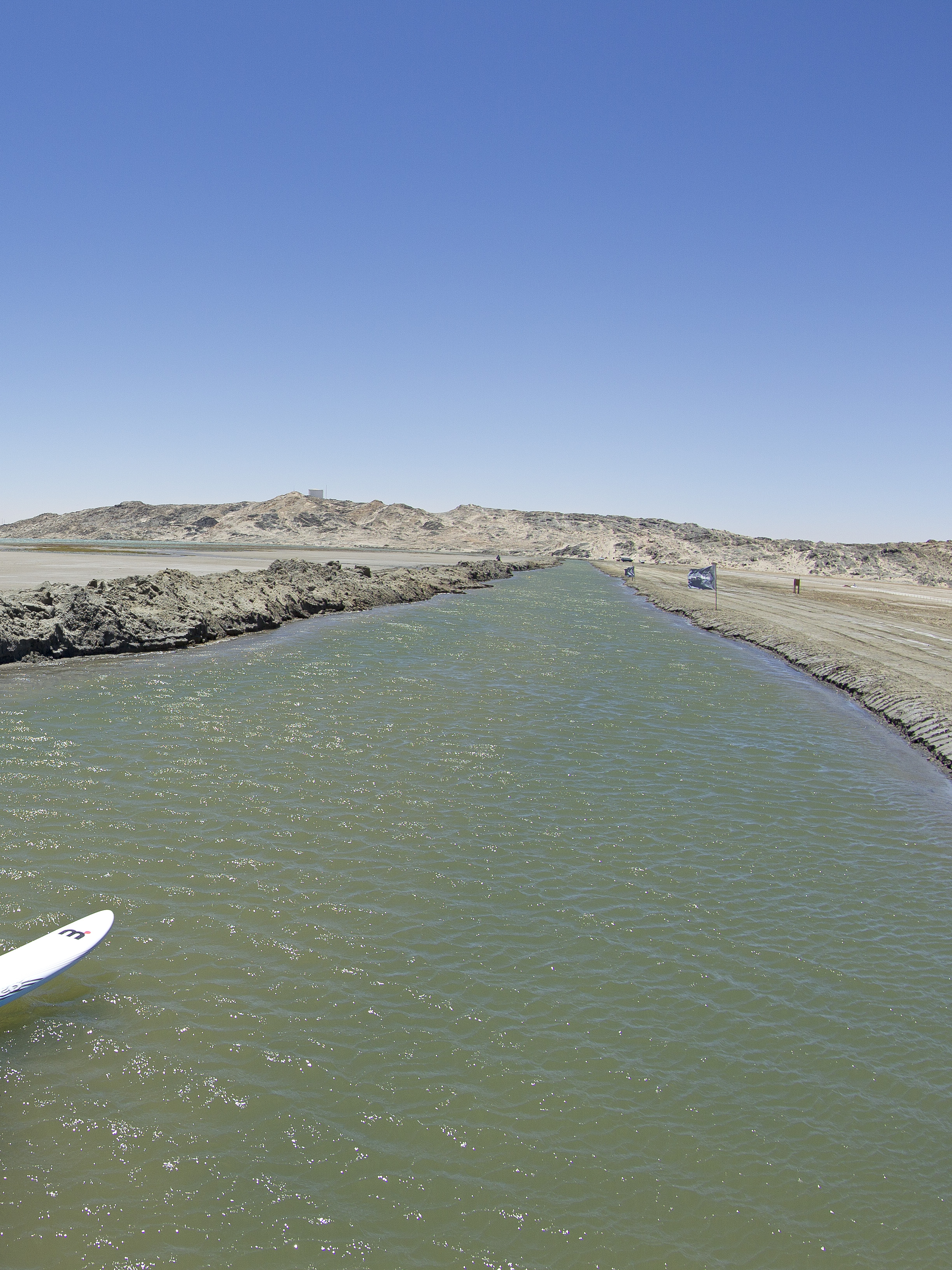
The Lüderitz Speed Challenge had set records

== Techniques ==
Kiteboarding can pose hazards to surfers, beachgoers, bystanders and others on the water. Many problems and dangers that may be encountered while learning kiting can be avoided or minimized by taking professional instruction through lesson centers. Kitesurfing schools provide courses and lessons to teach entry-level skills and more advanced ones, including:

- Kite, lines and bar handling and maintenance
- True and relative wind concepts, including basic kite navigation in the wind window
- Landing and launching the kite
- Kite assisted swimming, known as 'body dragging'
- Water start
- Relaunch and self-rescue techniques
- Navigation rules and best practices regarding safety
- Up-wind and down-wind navigation
- Basic turning or jibing up to "heel turn jibe"
- Dealing with surf and waves
- Pop and controlled jumping and flying
- Board grabs, tricks performed while a rider is jumping or has gained air from popping by grabbing the board in a number of positions with either hand. Each grab has a different name dependent on which part of the board is grabbed and with which hand grabs it. The names generally originate from other board sports like skateboarding and snowboarding
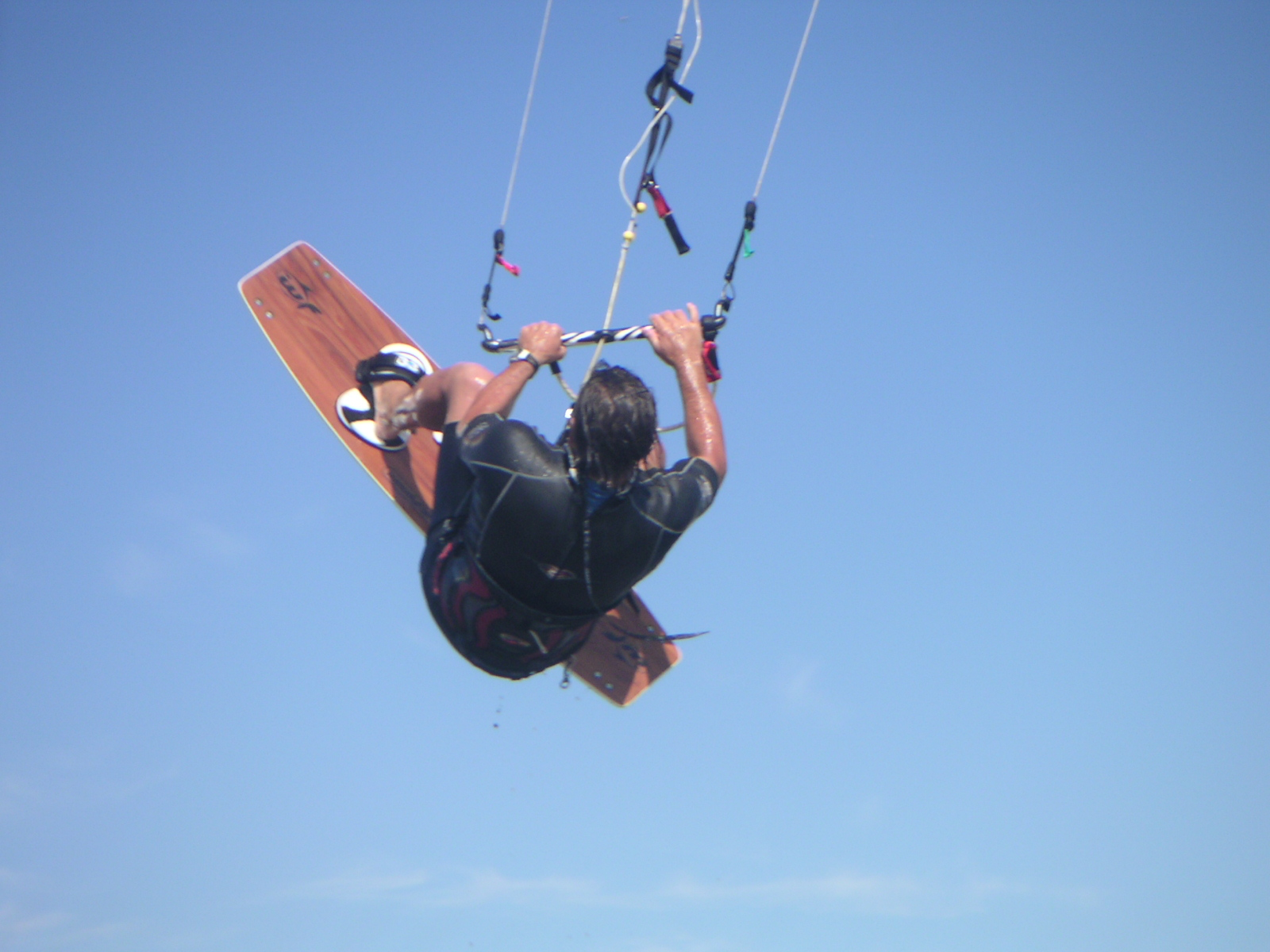
Jumping

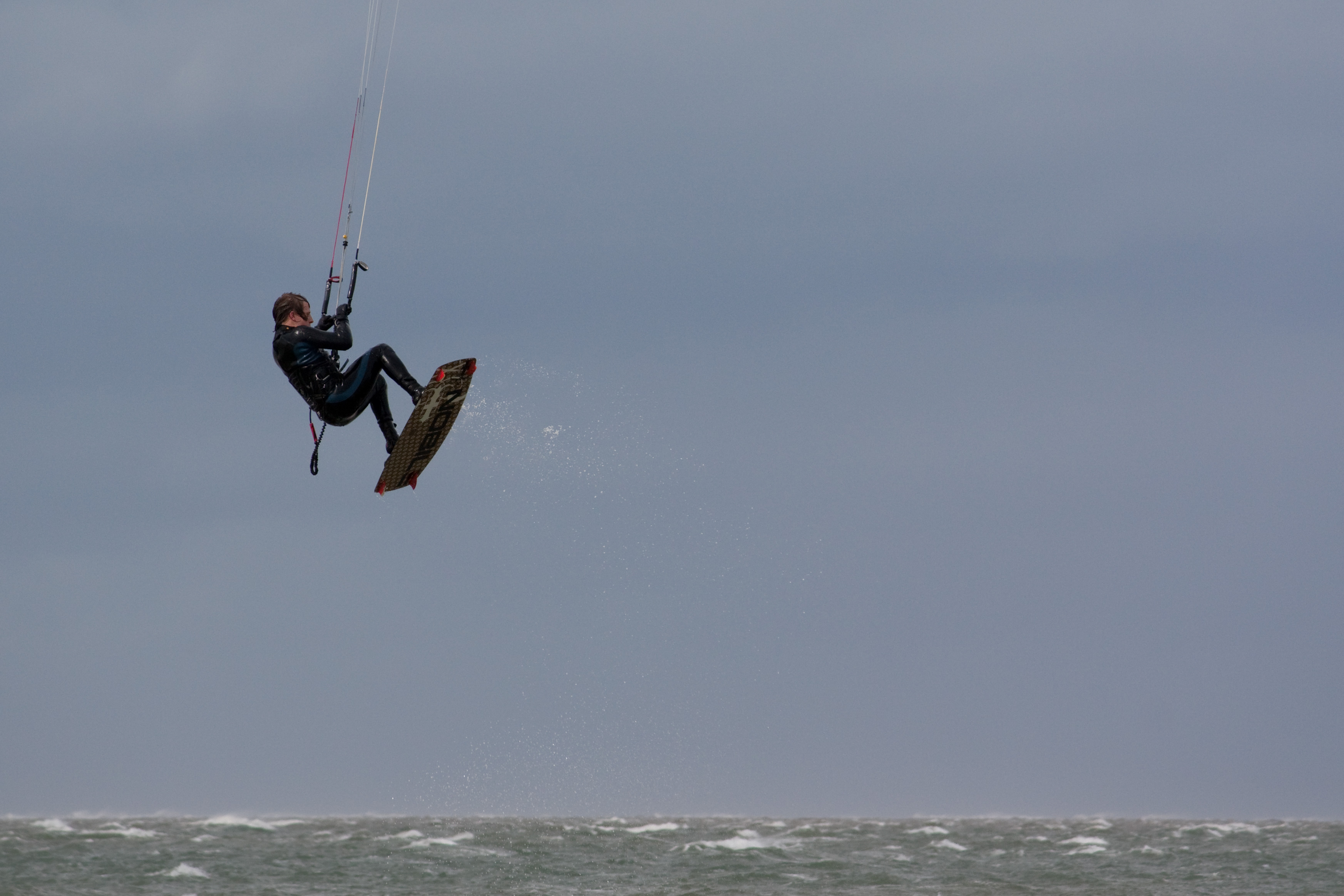
Big Air

Kiteboarder edging his board

== The wind ==
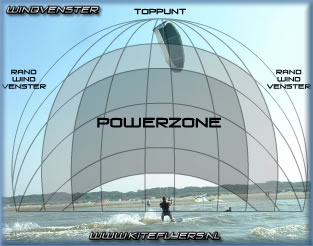
The wind window

=== Wind strength and kite sizes ===
Kitesurfers change kite size and/or line length depending on wind strength — stronger winds call for a smaller kite to prevent overpower situations. Kitesurfers determine the wind strength using either an anemometer or, more typically, visual clues as shown in the Beaufort scale. Modern kites dedicated to kitesurfing provide a "depower" option to reduce the power in the kite. By using depower, the kite's angle of attack to the wind is reduced, thereby catching less wind in the kite and reducing the pull.

Bow kites have a wider wind range than C-kites, so two kite sizes (such as 7 m^{2} and 12 m^{2}) could form an effective quiver for winds ranging from 10 to 30+ knots for a 75 kg (165 lb) rider.

=== Wind direction and speed ===
Cross-shore and cross-onshore winds are the best for unassisted kiteboarding. Direct onshore winds carry the risk of being thrown onto land or stuck in shallows. Direct offshore winds pose the danger of being blown away from the shore in the event of equipment failure or loss of control. However offshore winds can be quite suitable in confined waters, like in a lake or estuary, or when a safety boat is assisting.

The kiter must maintain a clear perception of the wind direction but also of the wind speed. The Beaufort scale is of great assistance in helping users assess the situation. A range of wind up to 33 knots covers the conditions for a safe practice for an experienced rider. A less experienced one should avoid riding with more than 15 knots. Most twintip boards and inflatable kites would be barely rideable below 11 knots, therefore for most cases a user should focus on the winds classified as moderate up to strong.

=== Apparent wind ===
Even if there is no wind blowing, a kiter can act on the kite lines and force it to move, and then, like with a row, it generates some force resulting from the incidence of the air into the kite's surface. In a gentle breeze, if the user action increases the air speed around the kite 10 times, the generated force increases 100 times, since the wind force acting on a kite is proportional to the square of the wind speed acting on it. Thus the relevant notion of apparent wind, which is the actual wind acting on the moving kite, sail or wing.

The apparent wind is measured taking the moving kite as the reference frame, therefore its other name as relative wind. By opposition, the wind measured relatively to the ground is called true wind.

While the other wind sports can generate considerable apparent wind, their wind forces are limited by the movement of the user platform, since it is attached more or less rigidly to the wing or sail. In this aspect, kiteboarding seems unique among other wind sports, since it allows the user to generate apparent wind independently of the movement of the user platform, the board. For instance, in the initiating kiteboard technic called waterstart, while the user prepares to start in the water, the kite is sent aggressively, generating a propulsive impulse. Then the resulting movement of the board increases tension on the kite lines, which the user controls to manage the riding speed and to navigate at will. The composition of the movements of both the kite and the board, offer the user a great deal of navigation flexibility and creativity, including the possibility to jump significantly, making this a true 3-dimensional sport.

=== Wind power, control lines and kite paths ===
In some way all wind sports harvest the energy of the wind. The greater the volume of the atmosphere available to be harvested by the sails, the bigger the available energy to propel the users. As a taller sailing ship harvests more energy from the wind, so does a kiteboarder with longer lines. Compared to a kiteboarder, a windsurfer can extract a higher ratio of wind energy from the available atmosphere volume, but since such volume is much smaller, the resulting energy could be much less than in kiteboarding.

To increase the power, the kiteboarder typically navigates the kite along an S-shape path, increasing the harvesting of energy since it is traversing most of the atmosphere volume around him. This S-shaped movement is most common when the kiters need a moderate improvement of power. If the user needs an intense improvement of power, it loops the kite. Such loops are stronger when the loop radius is large, and traverses a larger atmosphere volume. The kite loop is an advanced practice, and its power can be quite dangerous. With most modern kites and control bars, to end a kite loop the user just pushes away or releases the bar.

Regarding the length of the lines connecting the kite to the user, longer lines allow the user to harvest wind energy in a larger volume. Due to the boundary layer effect longer lines also allow to harvest stronger winds higher up in the atmosphere. But longer lines make the kite slower to respond to the user actions on the control bar, since the lines form a more pronounced spring-like catenary. Therefore, kitesurfers, who need to react fast to incoming waves, tend to use shorter lines than the other kiters. For safety reasons the newcomers to the sport are usually trained with short lines, limiting the power build up.

=== Wind window ===
The wind window is the 180 degree arc of the sky downwind of the rider in which the kite can be flown - roughly one fourth of a sphere's surface, which radius is the length of the lines. It is the atmosphere volume in which the kiter can navigate the kite to harvest wind energy.

If the rider is facing downwind on a surface, like the ocean, the wind window covers roughly all the area the rider can see, from the rider's peripheral vision on one side, along the horizon to the other side, and then directly overhead back to the first side. If the rider somehow puts the kite out of the window — for example, by riding downwind too quickly and sending the kite directly overhead and behind, the kite stalls and often falls out of the sky.

The eventual inefficiency of the kite can obviate for it to reach the edge of the wind window. In such cases the magnitude of the wind window can be reduced to as little as a 120 degree arc, instead of the expected 180 degree.

The wind window is centered in the user location. Since the user is carried by the board, the wind window is affected by the movement of the board. Therefore, the wind window rotates as the board moves and generates apparent wind into itself. For instance, when the kiter navigates perpendicular to the true wind at a speed equal to the true wind's, the apparent wind felt on the board increases 42% compared to the true wind, but rotates 45º against the movement. With such rotation, even if the user keeps the kite at the edge of the wind window for trying to keep it pulling in the travelling direction, the kite lines would be at an angle of 45º downwind of the board path, forcing the kiter to edge the board to oppose its tendency to slip downwind. Such board edging is an indispensable technique for navigating upwind, and can be made at a much more extreme angle to the kite lines, almost up to 90º.

The wind window rotation degrades the performance when riding fast in a path upwind. To minimize the wind window rotation and sail upwind as much as possible, the kiter should keep the slowest board speed without sinking the board by lack of hydrodynamic lift. High flotation boards like surfboards are preferable in such cases. Also, keeping the kite high in window, pulling up the user and the board, is quite efficient in coping both with the reduced hydrodynamic lift of the board and with the intended reduction of the board speed.

=== Arbitrary atmosphere volume swept by the kite ===
The kite is a peculiar sail because it can be swept arbitrarily through the atmosphere, usually in specific patterns, so the user can harvest a significant amount of wind energy, much larger than with an equivalent sail fixed to a mast.

The peculiar travel pattern of a kite, compared to a sail fixed to a mast as in windsurf

The kite and the lines are light, in the range between 2 and 4 kg, but the aerodynamic drag can be significant since the kite can travel much faster than a windsurf sail. Therefore, part of the energy harvested is spent in the movement of the kite itself, but the remainder propels the user and the board.

For instance, a user riding toward the beach raises the kite to slow it down and convert traction into lift. Then, instead of speed he feels an increase of the force upward, necessary to keep himself above the breaking waves.

Another specific advantage of the kite being able to be swept at will, is that the user can take advantage of the atmosphere boundary layer, either rising the kite to harvest the stronger winds blowing in the higher zone of the wind window, or during overpowering gusts he can drive the kite low, skimming the water near the edge of the wind window.

=== Air temperature and humidity ===
Seasoned kiteboarders frequently attribute to moist and hotter air a notable reduction in kite performance. In fact the lift force of a kite is proportional to the air density. Since both the temperature and the relative humidity are important detrimental factors in the air density, the kiters subjective valuation is correct.

In the range between 10 °C and 40 °C a kite loses approximately 0.4% of lift per degree Celsius. It means that a kiter practicing one given day in the Baltic, and then travelling to the Mediterranean, could experience 10% less pull using the same kite at the same wind speed.

== Equipment ==
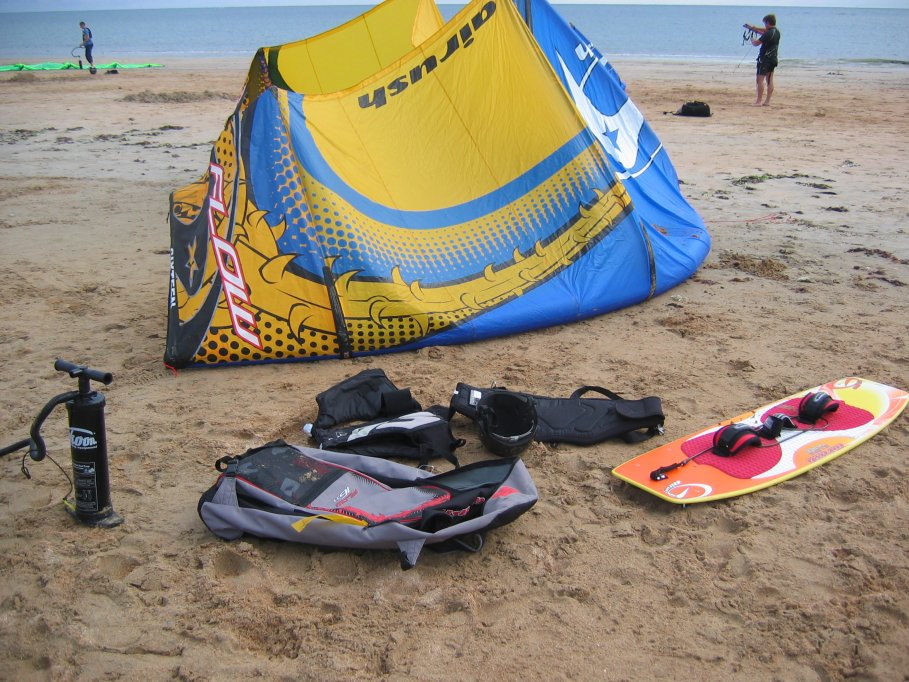
Most kitesurfing equipment: LEI Kite with bag and pump, twintip board and harness, plus floatation vest and helmet, lacking only the bar and lines

With the development of Internet markets for used goods, used but reliable kiteboarding equipment has become much less expensive, significantly reducing the barrier to the adoption of the sport. Moreover, the sport is convenient regarding transportation and storage, since the kites are foldable and the boards are smaller than most surf and paddling boards.

Equipment depreciation can cost between £270 per year for second hand gear, to £1360 per year for brand new, not discounted kites and accessories. In 2017, 150,000 kites were sold globally, compared to 400,000 surfboards sold each year.

=== Power kites ===
A delta-LEI(left), C-LEI(right) and foil(top center) power kites

A power kite is available in two major forms: leading edge inflatables and foil kites.

==== Leading edge inflatables ====
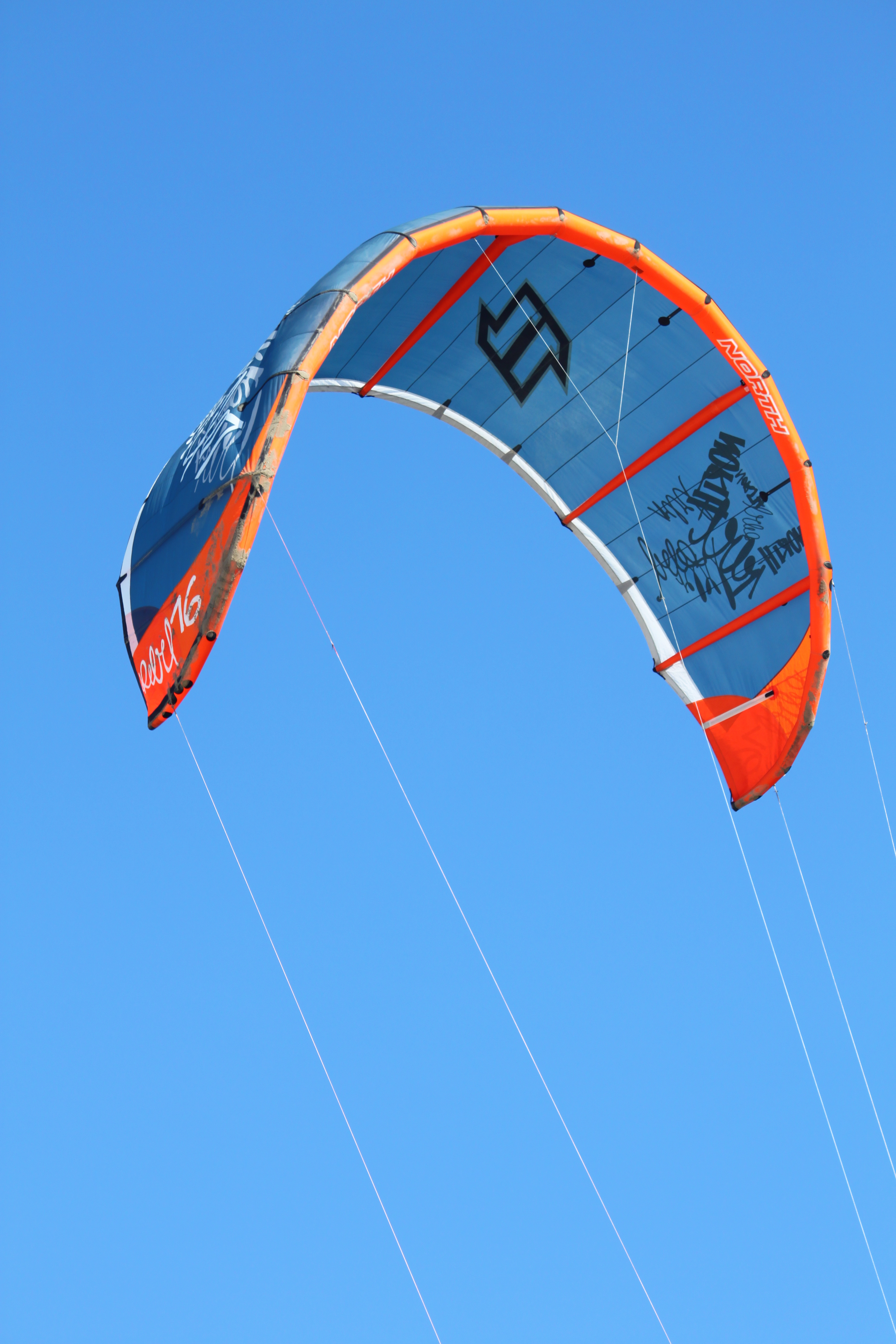
A leading edge inflatable kite

Leading edge inflatable kites, known also as inflatables, LEI kites, are typically made from ripstop polyester with an inflatable plastic bladder that spans the front edge of the kite with separate smaller bladders that are perpendicular to the main bladder to form the chord or foil of the kite. The inflated bladders give the kite its shape and also keep the kite floating once dropped in the water. LEIs are the most popular choice among kitesurfers thanks to their quicker and more direct response to the rider's inputs, easy relaunchability if crashed into the water and resilient nature. If an LEI kite hits the water or ground too hard or is subjected to substantial wave activity, bladders can burst or it can be torn apart.

In 2005, Bow kites (also known as flat LEI kites) were developed with features including a concave trailing edge, a shallower arc in planform, and a distinctive bridle with multiple attachment points along the leading edge. These features allow the kite's angle of attack to be altered more and thus adjust the amount of power being generated to a much greater degree than previous LEIs. These kites can be fully depowered, which is a significant safety feature. They can also cover a wider wind range than a comparable C-shaped kite. The ability to adjust the angle of attack also makes them easier to re-launch when lying front first on the water. Bow kites are popular with riders from beginner to advanced levels. Most LEI kite manufacturers developed a variation of the bow kite by 2006. Bow kites with a straight trailing edge are named ´delta´ kites, given their triangular outline.

Early bow kites had some disadvantages compared to classic LEI kites:

- They can become inverted and then not fly properly
- They can be twitchy and not as stable
- Heavier bar pressure makes them more tiring to fly
- Lack of "sled boosting" effect when jumping

In 2006, second generation flat LEI kites were developed, combining near total depower and easy, safe relaunch with higher performance, no performance penalties, and reduced bar pressure. Called Hybrid or SLE kites (Supported Leading Edge), these kites are suitable for both beginners and experts.

In 2008, Naish introduced another kite design, with their "Sigma Series" of kites. These kites are a SLE design and feature a unique "bird in flight" shape with the center of the kite swept back to put much of the sail area behind the tow point, which Naish claims has multiple benefits.

In 2009, the performance revolution shows no sign of slowing. Bridled designs feel more like C kites, and five-line hybrids have better depower capability than ever before. There are more than thirty companies manufacturing Leading edge inflatable kites. The delta-kites are growing in popularity since 2008 with around 12 companies offering delta-kites since 2008/2009.

Between 2009 and 2013 kite technology has continued to grow. Kites have become lighter, more durable, much easier to launch and safer. Manufacturers have continued to add new safety features. This has resulted in a growing number of new riders, both younger and older. In 2013, there are at least 20 "major" kite manufacturers, each with multiple models available. Many of the manufacturers are on their third or fourth generation of kites.

==== Foil kites ====
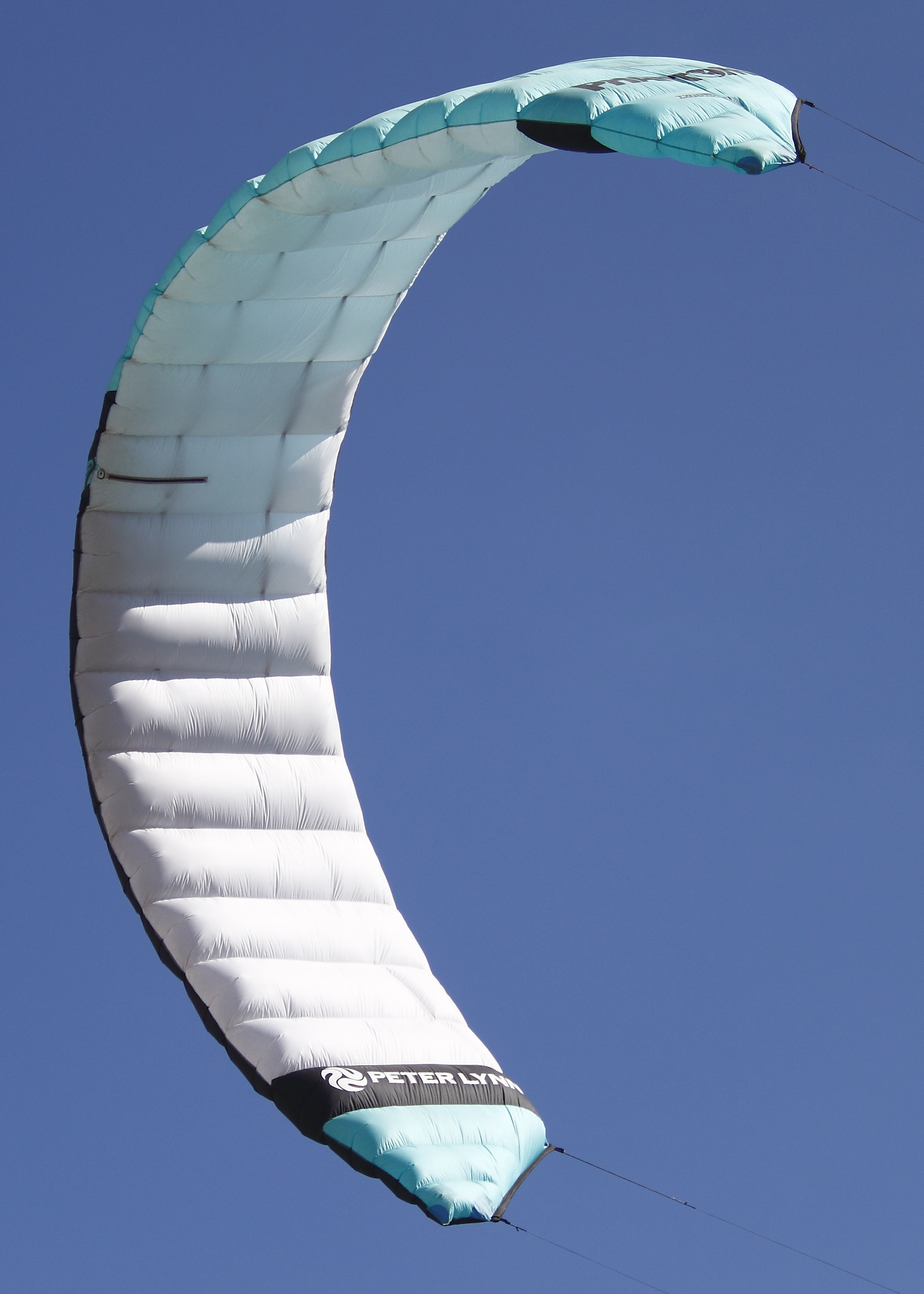
A Foil kite

Foil kites are also mostly fabric (ripstop nylon) with air pockets (air cells) to provide it with lift and a fixed bridle to maintain the kite's arc-shape, similar to a paraglider. Foil kites have the advantage of not needing to have bladders manually inflated, a process which, with an LEI, can take up to ten minutes. Foil kites are designed with either an open or closed cell configuration.

Open Cell
Open cell foils rely on a constant airflow against the inlet valves to stay inflated, but are generally impossible to relaunch if they hit the water, because they have no means of avoiding deflation, and quickly become soaked.

Closed Cell
Closed cell foils are almost identical to open cell foils except they are equipped with inlet valves to hold air in the chambers, thus keeping the kite inflated (or, at least, making the deflation extremely slow) even once in the water. Water relaunches with closed cell foil kites are simpler; a steady tug on the power lines typically allows them to take off again. An example for a closed cell kite is the Arc Kite.

==== Kite sizes ====
Kites come in sizes ranging from 0.7 square meters to 21 square meters, or even larger. In general, the larger the surface area, the more power the kite has. Kite power is also directly linked to speed, and smaller kites can be flown faster in stronger winds. The kite size—wind speed curve tapers off, so going to a larger kite to reach lower wind ranges becomes futile at a wind speed of around eight knots. Kites come in a variety of designs. Some kites are more rectangular in shape; others have more tapered ends; each design determines the kite's flying characteristics. 'Aspect ratio' is the ratio of span to length. High aspect ratios (ribbon-like kites) develop more power in lower wind speeds.

Seasoned kiteboarders may have three or more kite sizes to accommodate various wind levels, although bow kites may change this, as they present an enormous wind range; some advanced kiters use only one bow kite. Smaller kites are used by light riders, or in strong wind conditions; larger kites are used by heavier riders or in light wind conditions. Larger and smaller kiteboards have the same effect: with more available power a given rider can ride a smaller board. In general, however, most kiteboarders only need one board and one to three kites (7-12 sq m in size).

=== Other equipment ===
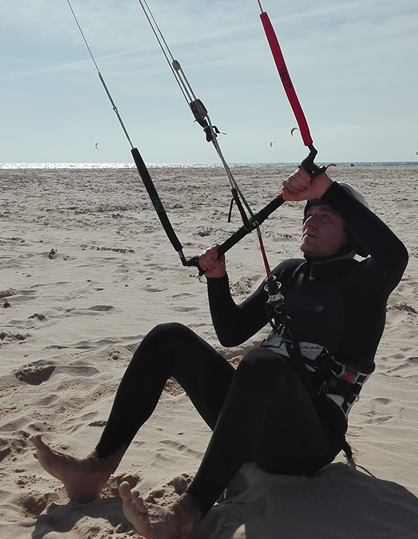
A kitesurfer uses a bar with lines to control the kite, attached to a harness, and can wear a wetsuit

- Flying lines are made of a strong material such as ultra-high-molecular-weight polyethylene, to handle the dynamic load in unpredictable wind while maintaining a small cross-sectional profile to minimize drag. They come in lengths generally between seven and thirty-three meters. Experimentation with line lengths is common in kiteboarding. The lines attach the rider's control bar to the kite using attachment cords on the kite edges or its bridle. Most power kites use a 3, 4 or 5-line configuration. Most control bars have 4 lines, 2 for most of the propulsive power and 2 for steering and for control of the angle of attack. The 5th line is used to aid in re-launching or to further adjustment of the kite's angle of attack, mostly in C-kites.
- The control bar is a solid metal or composite bar that attaches to the kite via the lines. The rider holds on to this bar and controls the kite by pulling at its ends, causing the kite to rotate clockwise or counter-clockwise like a bicycle. Typically a chicken loop from the control bar is attached to a latch or hook on a spreader bar on the rider's harness. Most bars also provide a quick-release safety-system and a control strap to adjust the kite's minimum angle of attack. Kite control bars, while lightweight and strong, are usually heavier than water; "bar floats" made of foam may be fixed to the lines right above the harness to keep the bar from sinking if lost in the water. Control bars can be specific to a particular kite type and size and not suitable for use with different kite types.
- A kite harness comes in seat (with leg loops), waist, or vest types. The harness together with a spreader bar attaches the rider to the control bar. The harness reduces the strain of the kite's pull from the rider's arms, spreading it across part of the rider's body. This allows the rider to perform jumps and other tricks while remaining attached to the kite via the control bar. Waist harnesses are the most popular harnesses among advanced riders, although seat harnesses make it possible to kitesurf with less effort from the rider, and vest harnesses provide both flotation and impact protection. Kite harnesses resemble windsurfing harnesses, but with different construction; a windsurfing harness is likely to fail when used for kiteboarding.

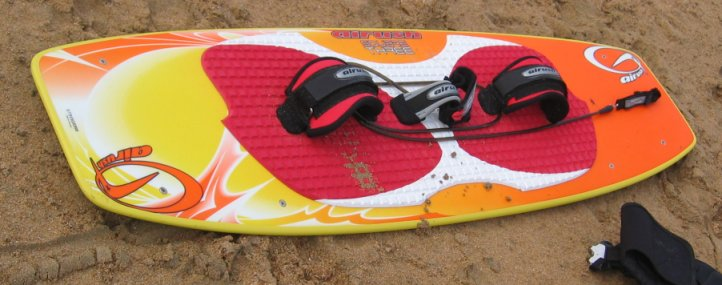
Twin tip kiteboard

- Kiteboard, a small composite, wooden, or foam board. There are now several types of kiteboards: directional surf-style boards, wakeboard-style boards, hybrids that can go in either direction but are built to operate better in one of them, and skim-type boards. Some riders also use standard surfboards, or even long boards, although without foot straps much of the high-jump capability of a kite is lost. Twin tip boards are the easiest to learn on and are by far the most popular. A new trend is kitesurfing with hydrofoil boards, which is difficult but opens new horizons to the riders by allowing them to ride in low winds. The boards generally come with sandal-type footstraps that allow the rider to attach and detach from the board easily; this is required for doing board-off tricks and jumps. Bindings are used mainly by the wakestyle riders wishing to replicate wakeboarding tricks such as KGBs and other pop initiated tricks. Kiteboards come in shapes and sizes to suit the rider's skill level, riding style, wind and water conditions.

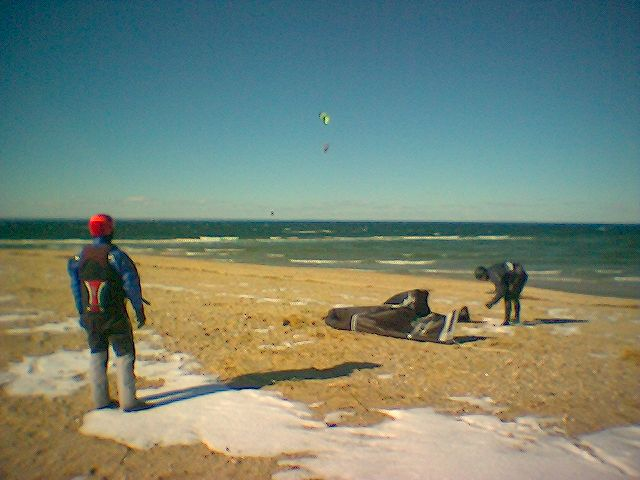
Kitesurfers wearing dry suits on Long Island in winter when the air and water temperatures are near 0 °C (32 °F)

- A wetsuit is often worn by kitesurfers, except in warmer conditions with light winds. When kitesurfing in strong winds, body heat loss is reduced by wearing a wetsuit. A "shortie" is worn to protect the torso only, and a full suit is used for protection against cool conditions, from marine life such as jellyfish, and also from abrasions if the rider is dragged by the kite. Neoprene boots are required if the beach has much shellfish or hard rocks. Dry suits are also used to kitesurf in cold conditions in winter.
- A safety hook knife is considered required equipment. The corrosion resistant stainless steel blade is partially protected by a curved plastic hook. It can be used to cut entangled or snagged kite lines, or to release the kite if the safety release system fails. Some kitesurfing harnesses are equipped with a small pocket for the knife.
- A helmet is often worn by kitesurfers to protect the head from blunt trauma. Helmets prevent head lacerations, and can also reduce the severity of impact injuries to the head, as well as compression injuries to the neck and spine.
- A personal flotation device or PFD may be required if the kitesurfer is using a boat or personal water craft for support. It is also recommended for kitesurfing in deep water in case the kitesurfer becomes disabled and must wait for rescue.
- An impact vest provides some protection against impacts to the torso area. They also provide some flotation and preclude the harness to climb the chest and hurt the ribs, during high power maneuvers.
- A board leash that attaches the board to the kitesurfer's leg or harness is used by some riders. However, many kitesurfing schools discourage the use of board leashes due to the risk of recoil, where the leash can yank the board to impact the rider, which can result in serious injury or even death. Generally, kitesurfers that use a board leash also wear a helmet to help protect against this.
- Signaling devices are useful if the kitesurfer needs to be rescued. This may be as simple as a whistle attached to the knife, or retro-reflective tape applied to the helmet. Some kitesurfers carry a mobile phone or two-way radio in a waterproof pouch to use in an emergency. A small Emergency Position-Indicating Radio Beacon (EPIRB) can be carried and activated to send out a distress signal.
- A buddy is important to help with launching and retrieving the kite, and to assist in an emergency.
- A GPS can be used to measure distance travelled, tracks and speed during a session.
- Poncho towels and changing robes are commonly used to dry off and get changed into and out of a wetsuit or swimwear waterside. Poncho towels are more commonly used in warmer weather, whereas changing robes typically have a waterproof shell and provide more insulation for colder temperatures.

== Physical practice ==
Kiteboarding is seen as a mid to high intensity exercise, but freeriding can be a low intensity practice like walking, and is usually done in long sessions of up to 2–3 hours. It is amenable to almost all ages. It can be seen as a supplement or a substitute for other fitness practices.

== Safety ==
Power kites are powerful enough to pull the rider like a boat in wakeboarding and to lift their users to diving heights. An uncontrolled kite can be dangerous, especially in environments with solid obstacles. A rider can lose control from falling or from sudden wind gusts, which can occur in the presence of strong winds from squalls or storms ("collard").

It is possible to be seriously injured after being lofted, dragged, carried off, blown downwind or dashed, resulting in a collision with hard objects including sand, buildings, terrain or power lines or even by hitting the water surface with sufficient speed or height ("kitemare", a portmanteau of kite and nightmare). Adequate quality professional kiteboarding training, careful development of experience and consistent use of good judgement and safety gear should result in fewer problems in kiteboarding.

=== Weather ===
Weather forecasting and awareness is the principal factor to safe kiteboarding. Lack of weather awareness and understanding the figures is frequent, but avoiding weather problems is possible. Choice of inappropriate locations for kiteboarding where the wind passes over land creating wind shadow, rotor with pronounced gusts and lulls has also factored in many accidents. Paying attention to the weather and staying within the limits of the rider's ability provides the safest experience. Kitesurfing close to storm fronts can be particularly dangerous due to rapid changes in wind strength and direction.

=== Aggravating factors ===
Lack of a sufficient downwind buffer distance between the kiter and hard objects has contributed to accidents reducing the available distance and time for reaction. Jumping and being airborne at inappropriate places such as shallow water or near fixed or floating objects can be hazardous. Collisions with wind surfers, other kite boarders or water craft are hazards, particularly at busy locations.

A kitesurfer can get farther from shore than an easy swim, which is the primary reason kitesurfing in directly offshore winds is discouraged. Marine hazards include sharks, jellyfish, sea otters, dolphins, and even crocodiles, depending on the location. Potential conflicts can also arise from the migratory movements of birds. Drowning has been a factor in severe accidents as well and may have been avoided in some cases through the use of an appropriate flotation aid or impact vest and development of acceptable swimming skills.

=== Safety equipment ===
Some kite designs from late 2005 and onward have included immediate and almost full depower integrated with the control bar and improved quick release mechanisms, both of which are making the sport much safer. However, lack of sufficient practice of emergency depowering the kite and going out in excessively strong or unstable weather can reduce the benefit of high depower kites.
Another important part of the safety equipment is the impact vest, which doubles as an improved floatation device. It reduces the severity of eventual impacts, but also improves the user endurance in the long procedures of self-rescue in deep waters, which almost every freeriding kiter experiences sooner or later. It is also important and overlooked as a complement to the harness, precluding it to climb along the chest during powerful kite loops, which otherwise would hurt the ribs.
The other important pieces of a reasonable safety kit are the safety hook knife to cut tangled lines, the helmet in a high visibility colour, a wet suit of reasonable thickness, depending on the water temperature, and possibly neoprene boots if the beach has much shellfish or hard rocks.

=== Statistics ===
Accidents can generate serious injuries or even be deadly. 105 accidents were reported in the Kiteboarding Safety Information Database between 2000 and September 2003, with 14 fatalities. In South Africa between October 2003 and April 2004, 83% of search & rescue missions involving kitesurf were in offshore winds with the kite still attached to the harness, uncontrolled in strong winds or impossible to relaunch in weak winds. On 30 missions, there were five injuries: two had bone fractures after being hit by their boards, two others were suffering from critical hypothermia and exhaustion and the fifth was exhausted and lacerated. There were no fatalities.

Advances in hybrid and bow kite designs leads to a better ability to control the power that they provide and effective safety release systems. In 2005, the U.S. kiteboarding fatality rate was 6 to 12 deaths for each 100,000 participants. This is higher than SCUBA diving (~4 to 5 per 100,000) and walking (~2 per 100,000), comparable to motor vehicle traffic (~15 per 100,000), and below paragliding (~88 per 100,000).

However these figures have to be correctly interpreted, since they do not account for the rate of accidents per hour of practice, which would be the telling index. Kiteboarding lends itself to a rather frequent practice, much like a gym program, arguably more frequent than other risky sports like scuba diving. Therefore, further data is required to properly evaluate the risk associated with kiteboarding.

=== Kitesurfing safety rules ===
While some countries have specific regulations on flying kites that may also apply to kitesurfing, most do not. However a kitesurfer should comply to the sailing rules regulating water crafts in many countries, like the U.S. Coast Guard regulations. Developed from such generic rules a set of kitesurf specific rules or recommendations has been taking form since the beginning of the sport.

The first such rule is the prudential rule: with so many people just discovering water sports, a kiter shouldn't assume others adequate knowledge, training or even proper attitude, and be prepared to observe self-preserving distances and always let the others perceive clearly its intentions and its intended path.

Waterstarters have priority: the rider going out from the beach has always priority over the riders coming in.

Kite High Rule - A kiter who is upwind (closest to the wind) must keep their kite high to avoid their lines crossing those of downwind kiters. Similarly, the downwind kiter must keep their kite low to avoid their lines crossing upwind kites. This applies regardless of whether kiters are on the same, or opposing courses.

Clearance Rule - A kiter while jumping must have a clear safety zone of at least 50m downwind because they move downwind during the jump. A rider must also have a clear safety zone of 30m upwind to jump as his lines could touch the kite or the lines of another rider kiteboarding close by (see Kite High rule). It's important to also consider potential hazards downwind and crosswind of the rider such as people, buildings, trees and other fixed obstacles. Because of the clearance rule a jumper never has the right of way.

Kiters are also considered as sailing vessels – so all the standard sailing rules apply such as:

Starboard Rule When kiters approach from opposite directions the kiter who has the wind on the starboard (right side, right leg/arm leads in direction of travel) has right of way. The kiter who has the wind on the port side (left side, left leg/arm are leads in direction of travel) shall keep out of the way of the other. In simple terms, this means "keep right" with the kiter coming in the opposite direction passing on the left.

In sailing terms, a sailor or kiter with right of way is entitled to "insist" on exercising that right (warning opposing kiters) by shouting "starboard" clearly and in good time.

Many of the sailing rules of right of way are different expressions that the most maneuverable craft should give way to the less maneuverable one. Therefore, kiters should give way to fishing vessels, but not to a jet ski. Other boating rules such as no-go zones, distance from shore and swimmers also apply. Also surfing rules do apply, so for instance, the rider to catch a wave closer to the crest has the right of way even if not on a starboard tack, freeriders included.

== Market data ==
In 2012, the number of kitesurfers was estimated by the ISAF and IKA at 1.5 million persons worldwide (pending review). The global market for kite gear sales is worth US$250 million. The markets related to kiteboarding continue developing, as seen in these statistics from 2012:

- 60,000 new kiters annually
- 180,000 kites sold annually
- 75,000 boards sold annually
- 14 board builders
- 19 kite builders

Evolution of kite sales, worldwide:

- 1999: 29,000
- 2006: 114,465
- 2008: 140,000
- 2012: 180,000

A kiteboarding quiver for a single user could typically include 2-4 kites and 2-3 boards. With the exception of foil kites, these equipment pieces are quite rugged and would last from 3 up to 10 years of active use, and be repaired and resold several times. This aftermarket further improves the market development, removing cost barriers for newcomers. In locations like Portugal in 2018, a newcomer to kiteboarding typically buys a proper hands-on tutorial and then buys a basic set of used equipment for an overall total below €1000.

Transportation and storage is easy because the kites are foldable and the boards are smaller than surf and paddling boards. Compared to other sailing sports, kiteboarding is among the less expensive and more convenient. Moreover, nearby most metropolitan areas, it can be practised almost all year long, since it just requires some wind and a reasonably flat surface, like an estuary, a lake, a sandy strip, or a snow flat.

Although commonly associated with youth and extreme sports culture, kiteboarding also attracts middle-aged and older participants. In some metropolitan areas, especially outside the peak holiday seasons, it has become a regular recreational activity for urban, middle-income participants.

== World Champions ==
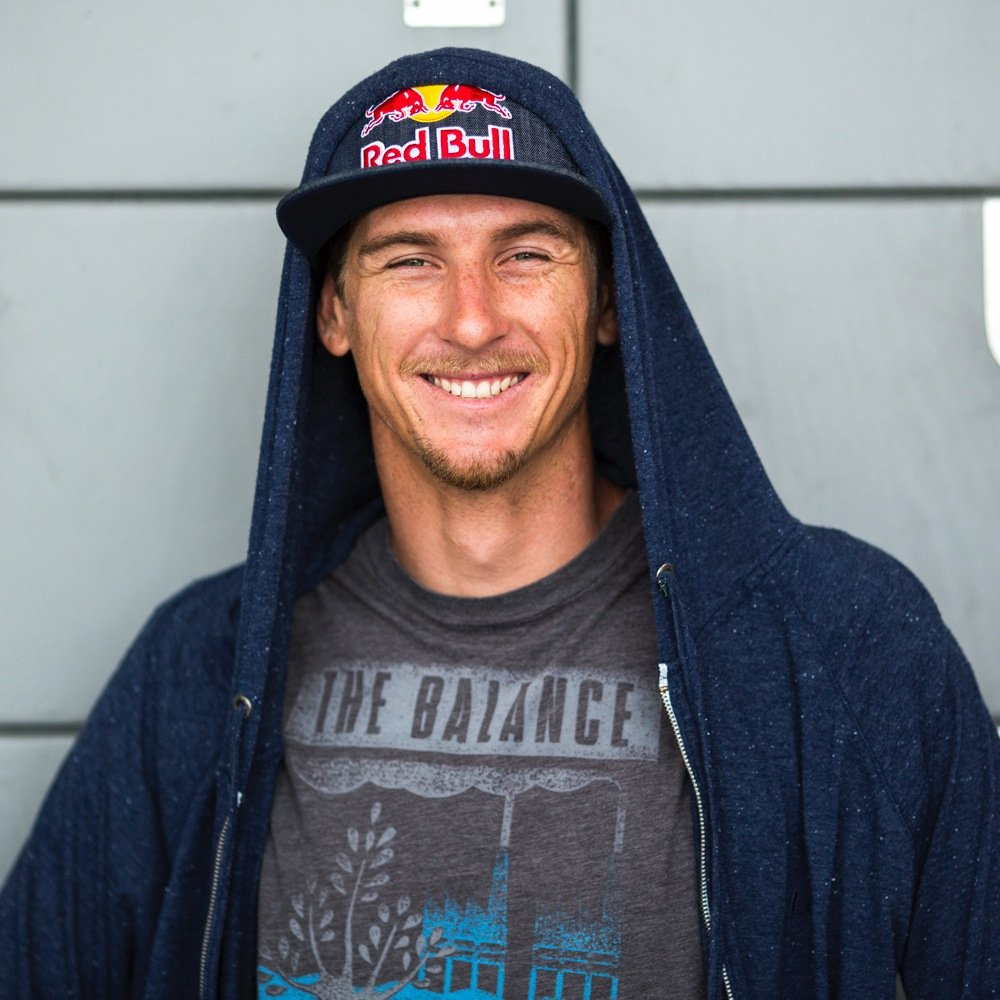
Aaron Hadlow dominated Freestyle from 2004 to 2008

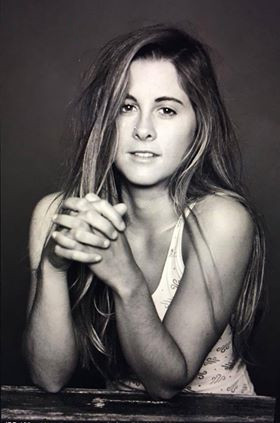
Gisela Pulido is a ten-time Freestyle Champion

Freestyle PKRA/VKWC/WKL/GKA Sanctioned Tours
Year	Men	Women
2022	Gianmaria Coccoluto (ITA) - 2 470 pt [Duotone, ION]	Mikaili Sol (BRA) - 2 870 pt, [Duotone, ION]
2021	Arthur Guillebert (FR) - 1 580 pt [Eleveight]	Mikaili Sol (BRA) - 2 000 pt [Duotone, ION]
2020	no title crowned	No title crowned
2019	Valentine Rodriguez (CO) - 8 301 pt [Duotone]	Mikaili Sol (BRA) - 8 400 pt [Duotone, ION]
2018	Carlos Mario Bebe (BRA) - 3 000 pt [Slingshot]	Mikaili Sol (BRA) - 3 000 pt [Duotone, ION]
2017	Carlos Mario Bebe	Bruna Kajiya
2016	Carlos Mario Bebe	Bruna Kajiya
2015	Liam Whaley	Gisela Pulido
2014	Christophe Tack	Karolina Winkowska
2013	Alex Pastor	Gisela Pulido
2012	Youri Zoon	Karolina Winkowska
2011	Youri Zoon	Gisela Pulido
2010	Andy Yates	Gisela Pulido
2009	Kevin Langeree	Bruna Kajiya
2008	Aaron Hadlow	Gisela Pulido
2007	Aaron Hadlow	Gisela Pulido
2006	Aaron Hadlow	Kristin Boese
2005	Aaron Hadlow	Kristin Boese
2004	Aaron Hadlow	
2003	Martin Vari	Cindy Mosey
2002		Cindy Mosey
2001	Martin Vari	

== See also ==
- Foilboard
- Kite applications
- Kite landboarding
- Kite mooring
- Kiteboating
- Kite rig
- SkySails
- Snowkiting
- Windsport
- Wing foiling
