= Martin Vari =

Argentine kitesurfer

Martin Vari (born February 27, 1982, in Argentina) is a professional kitesurfer and two times PKRA freestyle world champion in kitesurfing (2001 and 2003). 2007 he won the first PKRA wave contest.

Martin Vari is into kitesurfing since 1999. His passion is kiting in waves. He is one of the pioneers, bringing kitesurfing into the waves.

2009 Martin Vari founds his own label "Vari Kites" to develop and sell kitesurfing equipment.

In 2011 he was involved in a public scandal, when a home-video recorded with his ex-girlfriend Silvina Luna was leaked and made public in Twitter.
