= Liquid Force =

Liquid Force is a manufacturer of wakeboarding, wakesurfing, wake foiling, and other wake related products based in the United States. Liquid Force is one of the leading manufacturers in the wakeboard related products and focused on relentless innovation as its mantra. Besides manufacturing, the Liquid Force sponsors numerous events and athletes to grow and promote the sport. Liquid Force was founded in 1995 by Tony Finn and Jimmy Redmon, both pioneers in the sport of wakeboarding. Its headquarters are located in Carlsbad, California.

== History ==
=== 1985–1994 ===
In 1985 the future founders of Liquid Force Tony Finn and Jimmy Redmon separately looked for alternatives to waterskiing and surfing. Tony Finn created the so-called "skurfer" which had a similar shape to a surfboard but was much shorter. At the same time Jimmy Redmon came up with a water ski board which was produced by his own company Redline Designs. On contrary to the "skurfer" the water ski board was a bit lighter and the first to have foot straps. Founding the World Wakeboard Association (WWA), a governing body for the sport, Redmon created several contests, where Finn worked as an announcer resulting in the two crossing paths several times.

=== 1991 Waketech ===
Being rivals at first they soon became aware of each other's strengths which led to the establishment of their own firm, Waketech, with the help of an investor. In 1993 Waketech produced the Flight 69, the first twin-tip board with a symmetrical design, an innovation on the wakeboard market allowing riders to ride with either their left or right foot forward. Hence the new design was superior to the one pointed tip boards resulting in their team riders claiming titles at a wakeboard contest. In spite of their influence changing the sport of wakeboarding, Tony Finn and Jimmy Redmon had to deal with a setback. They had trouble with their investor and the two faced the end of Waketech.

=== 1995 - present Liquid Force ===
In 1995 three weeks before the World Championships Finn and Redmon founded a new firm called Liquid Force. Just in time for the Championships the two were able to present their new brand for the first time to the public by providing their team riders with Liquid Force Wakeboards and outfits . The company has won the WSIA Manufacturer of the Year award in 2005 and 2008. In 2008 Liquid Force bought Straight Line manufacturer of wakeboard and water ski ropes from the Yoshida Group.

== Sponsorship ==
Liquid Force is an active international sports and events sponsor. In order to promote the sport Liquid Force sponsors a variety of initiatives throughout the year for example The Monster Energy Triple Crown and others. Furthermore the company is constantly increasing its team of riders from countries all over the world such as USA, Germany, Argentina and Thailand.

== Wakeboarding team ==
1. Anna Nikstad
2. Claudia Pagnini
3. Daniel Grant
4. Felix Georgii
5. Fynn Bullock
6. Guenther Oka
7. Harley Clifford
8. Loic Deschaux
9. Luca Kidd
10. Meagan Ethell
11. Nico Von Lerchenfeld
12. Sam Brown
13. Raph Derome
14. Busty Dunn
15. Euge de Armas
16. Jan Gnerlich
17. Joe Battleday
18. Kai Ditsch
19. Liam Brearley
20. Maryh Rougier
21. Matty Muncey
22. Mikayo Mundy
23. Mike Dowdy
24. Rein Van Der Pas
25. Rivers Hendrick
26. Sanne Meijer
27. Ulf Ditsch

== Wakesurfing team ==
1. Bailey Dunn
2. Jake Caster
3. Perry Morrison
4. Tommy Czeschin

== Events ==
Besides sponsoring numerous initiatives, Liquid Force has been starting to launch its own events. Its main events are BROstock, BBQ BROdown and the Free For All Cable Tour, which is taking place in several cable park locations in the nation where people can learn to wakeboard for free.
