= Kite types =

Tethered objects which fly by aerodynamic forces

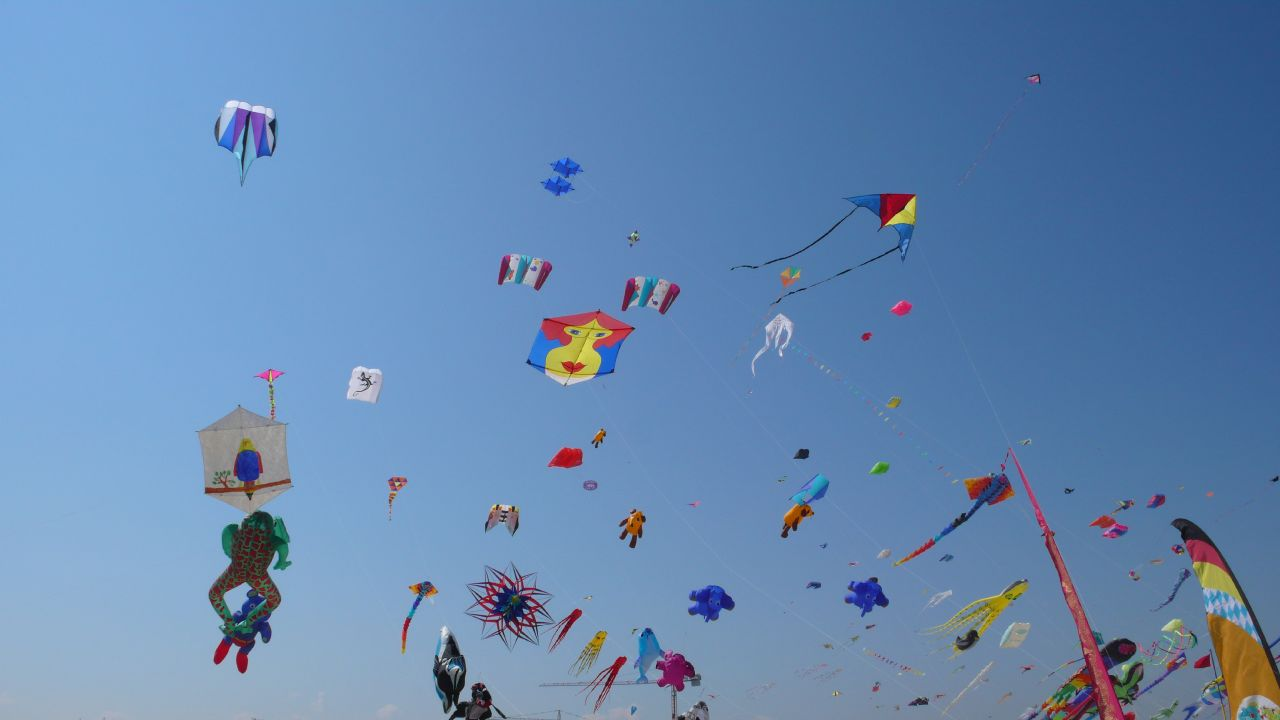
Various styles of kite in flight at the Cervia International Kite Festival

Kites are tethered flying objects which fly by using aerodynamic lift, requiring wind (or towing) for generation of airflow over the lifting surfaces.

Various types of kites exist, depending on features such as material, shape, use, or operating skills. Kites may fly in air, water, or other fluids such as gas and other liquid gaining lift through deflection of the supporting medium. Variations in design of tethering systems and lifting surfaces are regularly introduced, with lifting surfaces varying in stiffness from limp sheet material to fully solid material.

== Manufacture ==
Kites may be built by the flier or by a dedicated kite manufacturer, which may be a member of the Kite Trade Association International (KTAI), which also includes kite retailers.

== Materials ==
Kites have been made from the following materials:

- Plastic – for example, a Styrofoam-only kite
- Organic materials – such as plant leaves and grass
- Paper
- Textiles such as rip-stop nylon, nylon, or Dacron

== Wing character ==
- Monoplane
- Flexible sail
- Stiffened flexible sail
- Rigid wing
- Biplane
- Multiplane
- Low-aspect-ratio – wings that have a narrow chord (length from front edge to rear edge), compared with their span
- High-aspect-ratio – wings that have a wide chord, compared with their span
- Ram-air inflated
- Closed bladder, gas-inflated
- Rotating wing – also known as rotor kite or gyroglider (e.g. Focke Achgelis Fa 330)
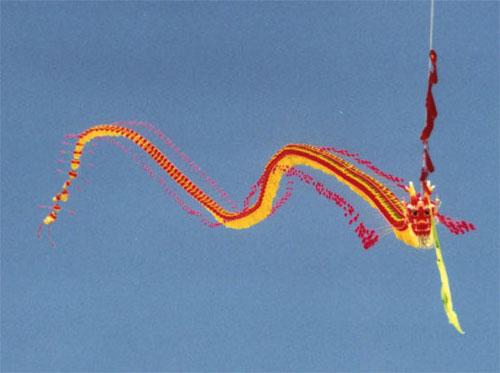
Dragon (a train of sub-kites)

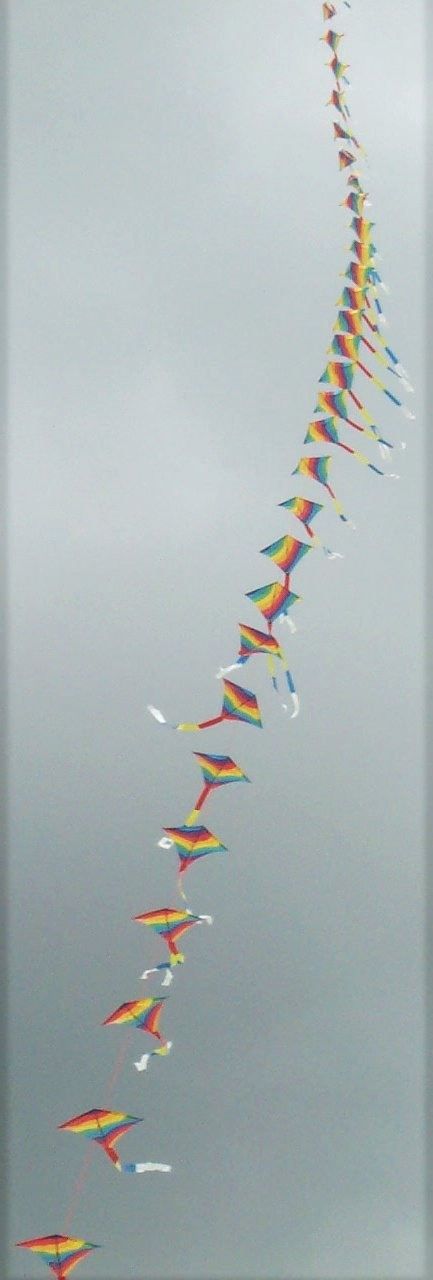
A train of little kites at the Bedford International Kite Festival, 2007

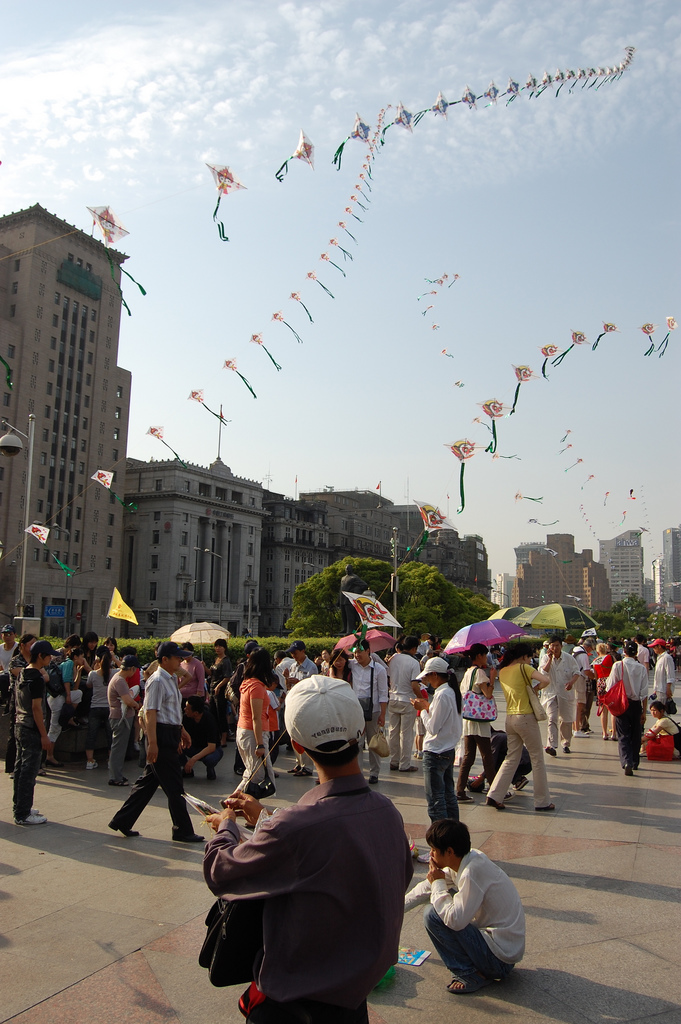
Vendors selling kite trains in Shanghai

Multiple unit kites
A multiple unit kite may be made of a single wing, several wings, or several sub-kite units arranged as trains, chains, coterie, single-branching, multiple-branching, arch-kite, "ladder" mill dynamic kite-chain, or combinations of these patterns. World records for the number of kites in a kite train are in the literature; teams of people are used to fly kites of high-count sub-kite units. Parafoil stacks have been built with over 200 kite units.
Multiple pilots
Large kite systems may require more than one pilot. In a team like the "Flying Squad" of nine kite pilots each person might fly his own sub-kite while, as a team, its kites form a unified display. One pilot may simultaneously fly several kites; the pilot with several kites forms one kite system of two, three or more kites in the system.

== Buoyancy ==
Kites are normally heavier than their supporting medium, such as a kite flown in air. Some kites have their lift augmented by lighter than air gases, allowing the kite to remain airborne without wind or being towed.

Hydro dynamic kites can have positive, neutral or negative buoyancy, relying on hydrodynamic lift to manoeuvre, rise, or dive.

== Control ==
Kites can be controlled by various methods which usually involve manipulation of the tether/control lines, lifting gas density control and in some cases by aero-dynamic control surfaces.

== Stability ==
Kites can have positive, neutral or negative stability, in all axes of control, in the same fashion as aircraft. Kites with positive stability tend to return to a stable state automatically, whereas those with neutral or negative stability require control inputs to return the kite to the required position or attitude.

== Legality ==
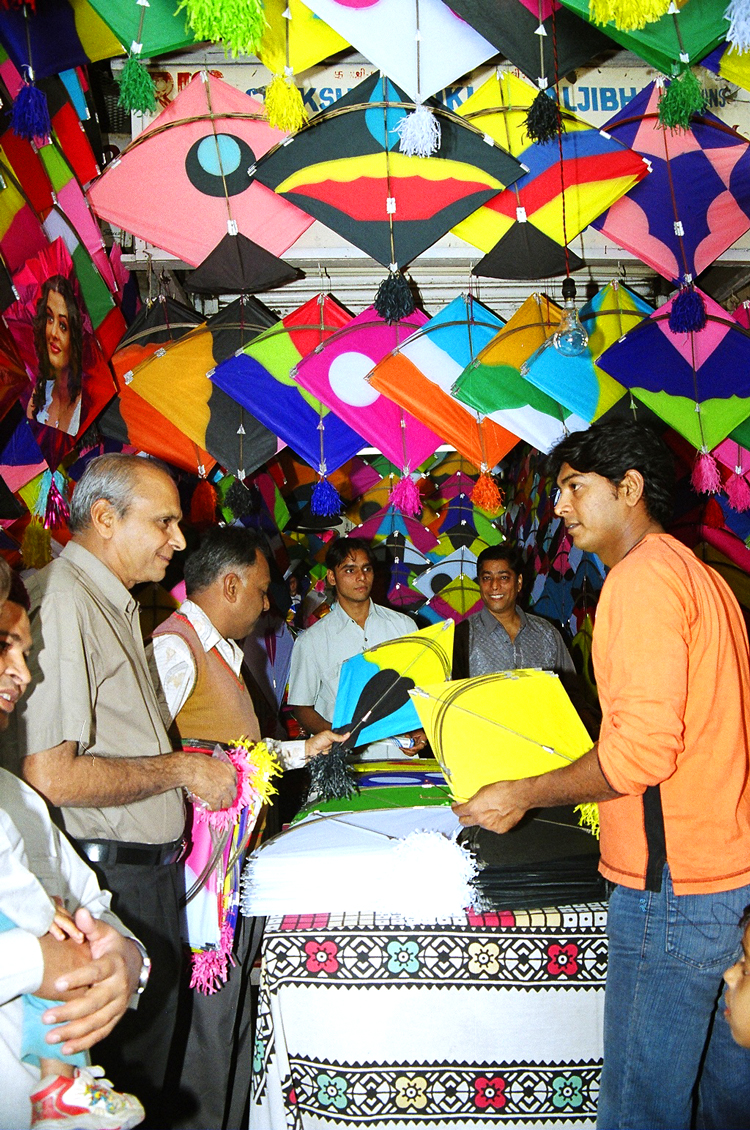
Kite vendor in India

Kite flying has been enjoyed for thousands of years in South Asia and the Indian subcontinent. The goal is to cut off the rival kite (usually flown by someone on a neighbouring rooftop). In order to cut the "enemy's" kite line, a very strong fishing line, prepared with glue and powdered glass covers some length of the kite line or wire. The kites themselves are usually of a standard size and shape (square shape) and mostly made from paper and split bamboo. After a kite is cut down, it has to be recovered by the cutting party. The last flying kite wins the game. The government of Pakistan has repeatedly outlawed this sport. It claimed that some people had been decapitated by driving with their scooters or motorbikes across abandoned glass powder & glue prepared kite wire. Others have fallen off roofs while engaging in kite flying. Other reasons that were given was that the mass sport and its associated festivals of Basant are considered "unislamic" and connected to Hinduism. Kite flying was also banned in Afghanistan during the reign of the Taliban. However, large sections of society simply ignore the ban. Since there was outrage over the ban, the government of Punjab has lifted the ban, however a ban on powdered glass wire has been imposed, as well as the thickness of the wire itself.

== Glossary of kite types ==
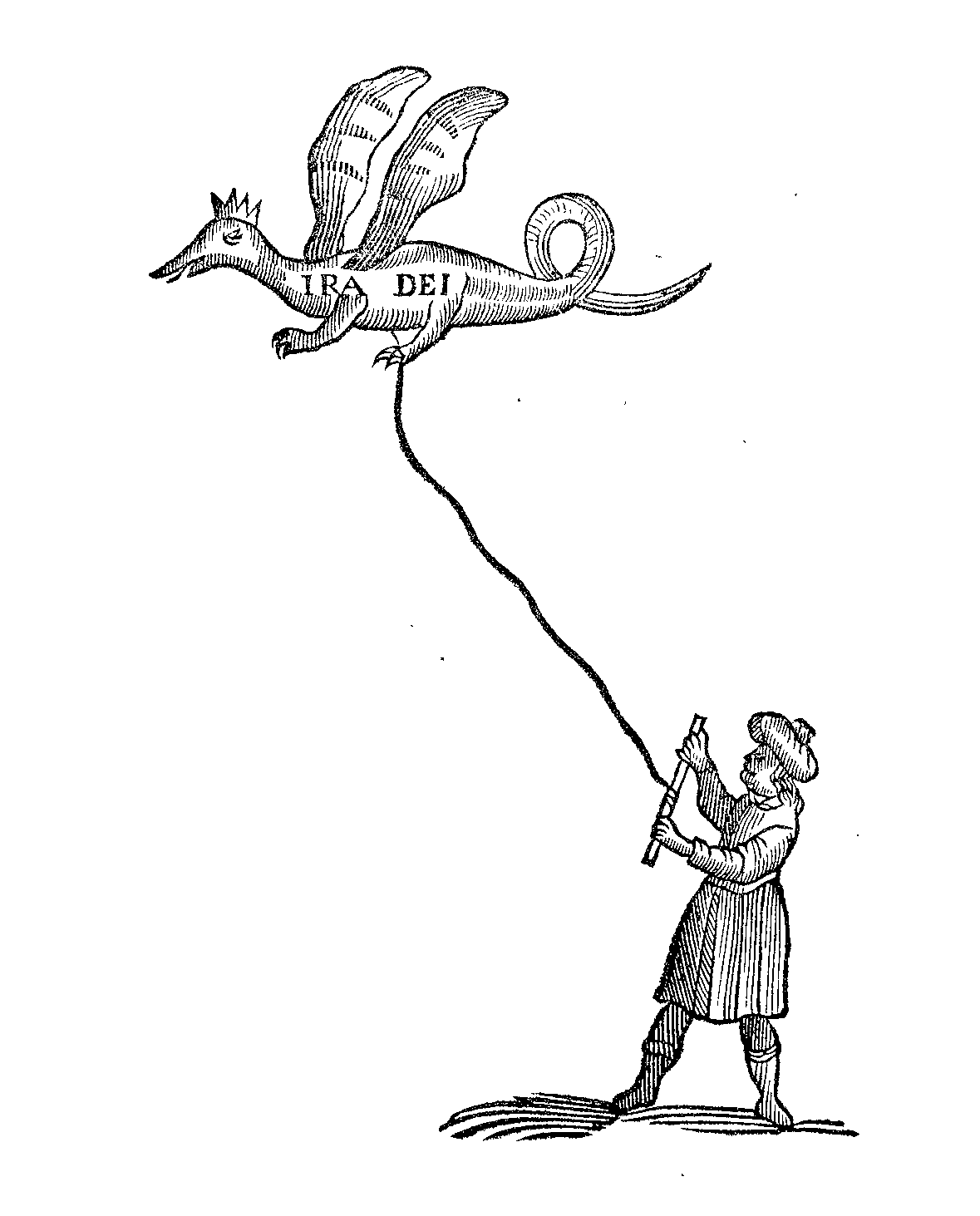
Control-bar figure kite

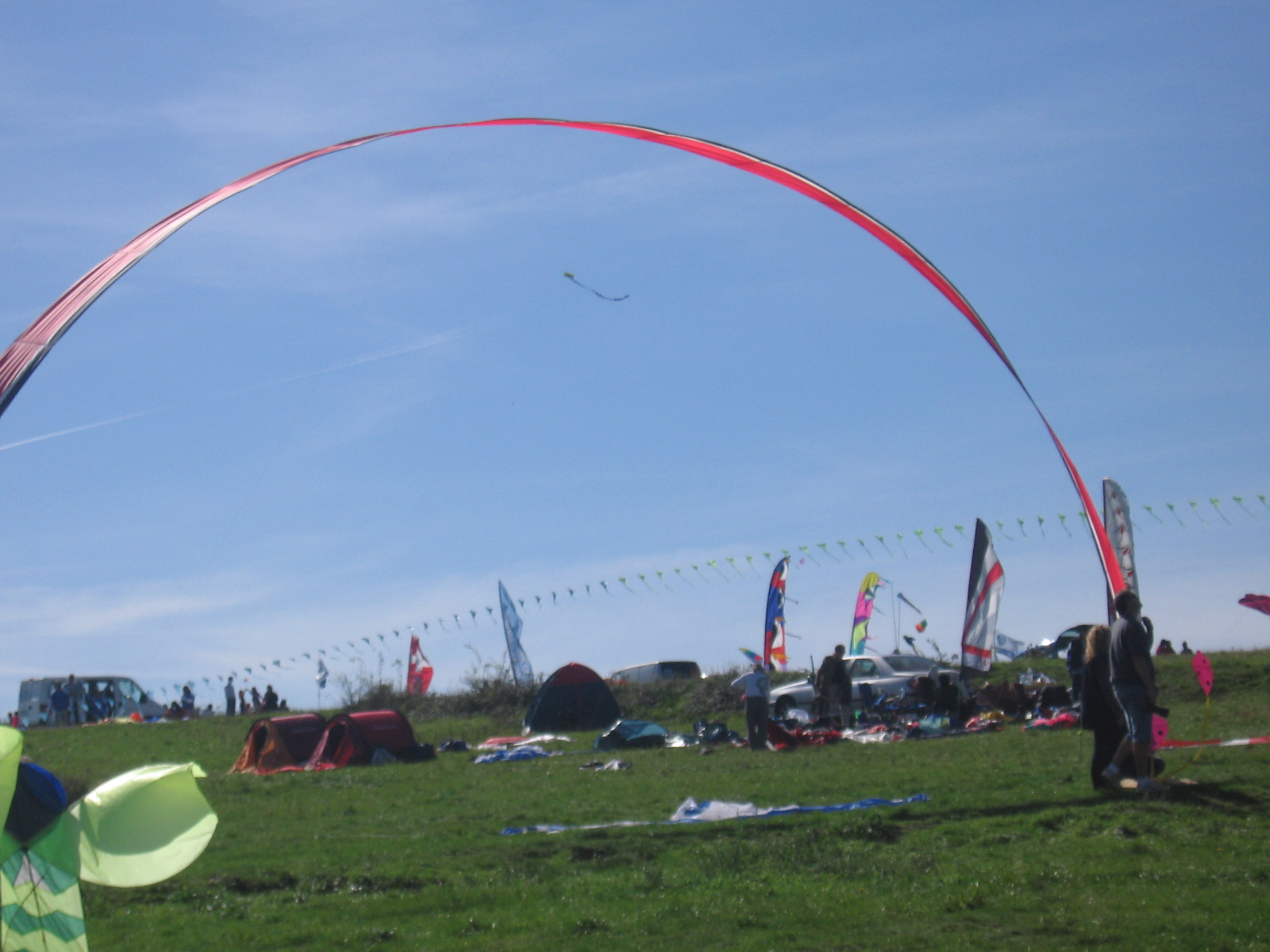
Specialized arch-ribbon (non-rotating), wind bow, or wide stiffened-ribbon kite

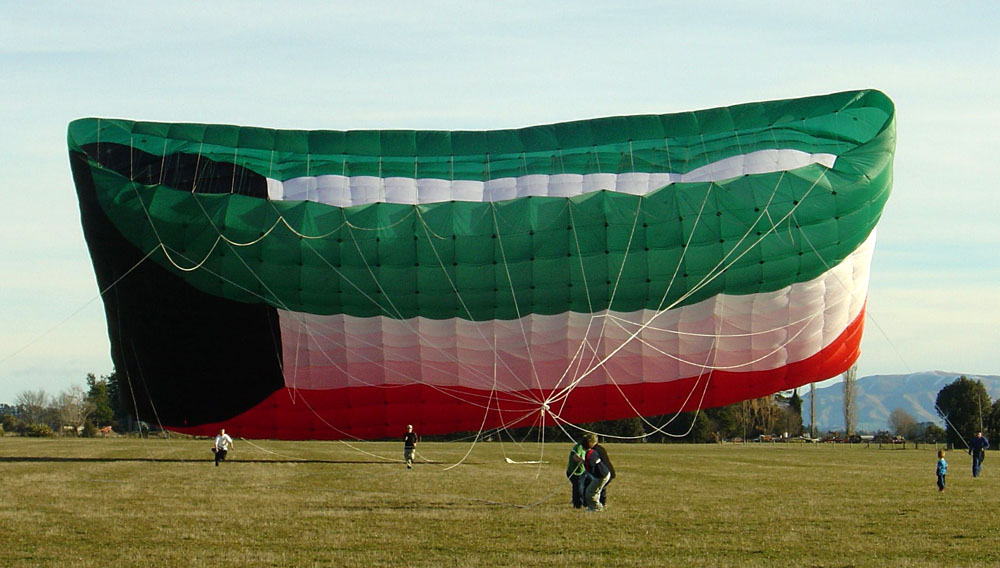
Peter Lynn holds the world record for largest kite. He made three same-sized versions with different decorations: Mega Flag in the United States and Mega Moon in Japan, and the Mega Kuwait Flag. A world record has been established: all three were flown at the same time at the same field.

=== A ===
Advertising kites
These kites hold advertisements, logos of organizations, slogans for causes. Orders of mass-produced kites imprinted with an advertisement form a significant part of kite commerce.
Aerial photography platform kites
Airplane kites
Large kite planes are finding an application in renewable energy generation.
Arc Kite
designed by Peter Lynn
Arch kite/multiple-kite arch
in this design, one or more lines holds many kites in an arch: a rotary two-anchor rainbow arch and/or a static two-anchor rainbow arch. If the kites making up the arch kite rotate using the Magnus effect the term also applied is rainbow kite or just bow kite or kite bow or "sky bow" or SkyBow; one form of the rotating arch or rainbow kite is the ribbon kite (in one or multiple segments). Swivels in the line are important. Distinguish between a long arching collection of kites in a bow, or a rainbow pattern from a power kite called a bow kite.

Aqua-glider
These various-formed manned kites were kited behind tow boats over water. Air Force Lt. Col. Bill Skliar in 1959 designed a biplane kite glider nicknamed Bayou Bird. In 1961, Tom H. Purcell designed and flew an aluminum-framed Fleep-like Rogallo hang glider kite over land; in 1962, he kited the same wing (but pontooned) while over water. His effort was imaged and noted in Skysurfer Magazine in its May/June issue of 1973, published by EAA inductee Michael Markowski, author of Hang Glider's Bible. The 1962 Mike Burns SkiPlane and 1963 Dickenson wings closely matched the Purcell, Barry Hill Palmer, and the Charles Richard NASA Paresev 1B wing; minor control sticks derived from the triangle control frame were used in each of these kites (which sometimes glided). These kites, towed high, could stop their kiting and release into a glide. See section "B" for boats that have a major operating sector as a kite (for example, a 1930 Peel Glider Boat).

Archimedes screw kite
These kinetic rotary kites mimic the Archimedean screw.
Arch kites
a single kite with an arch form, multiple arches, or an arch top

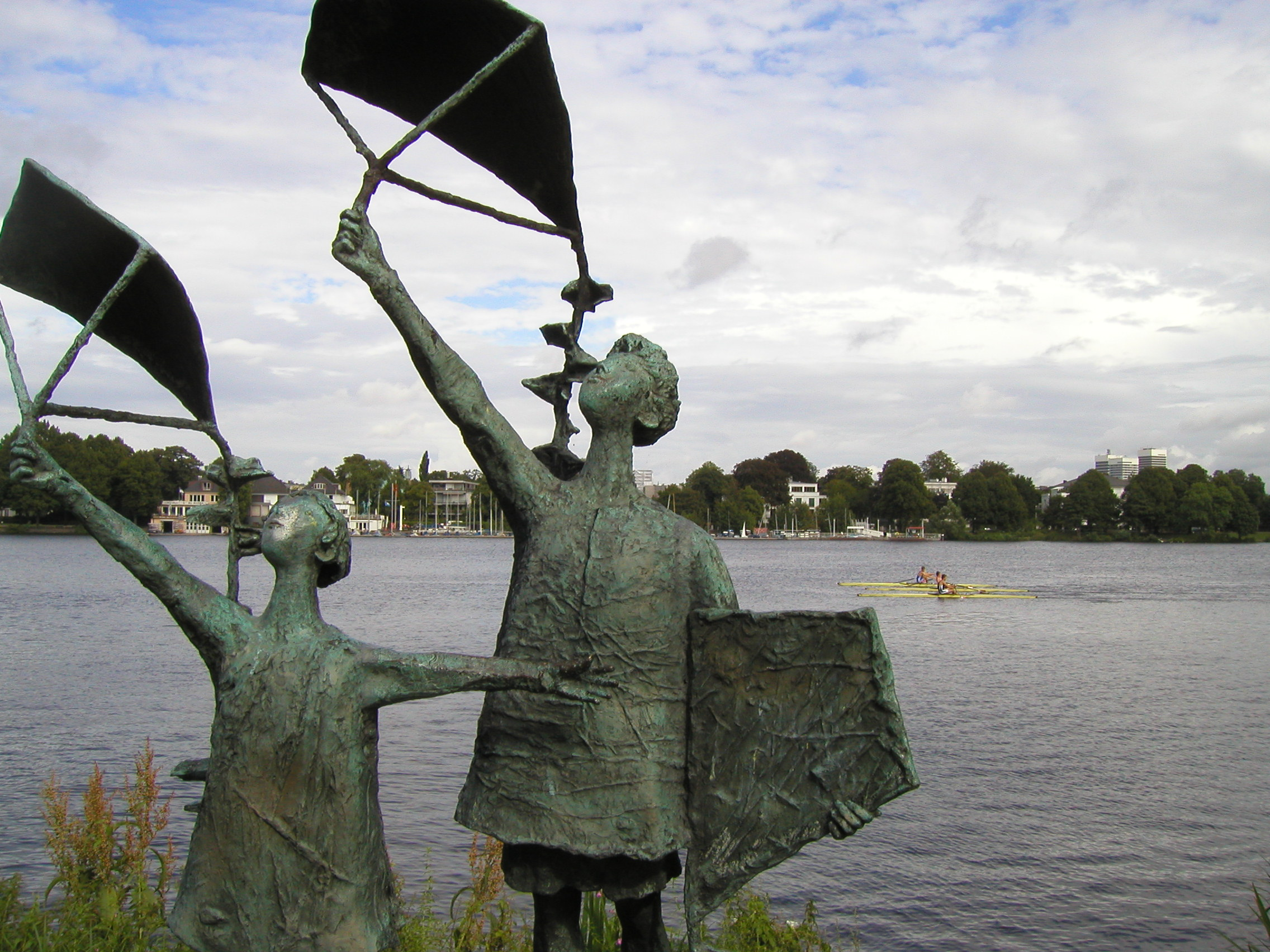
Three kites in an art sculpture

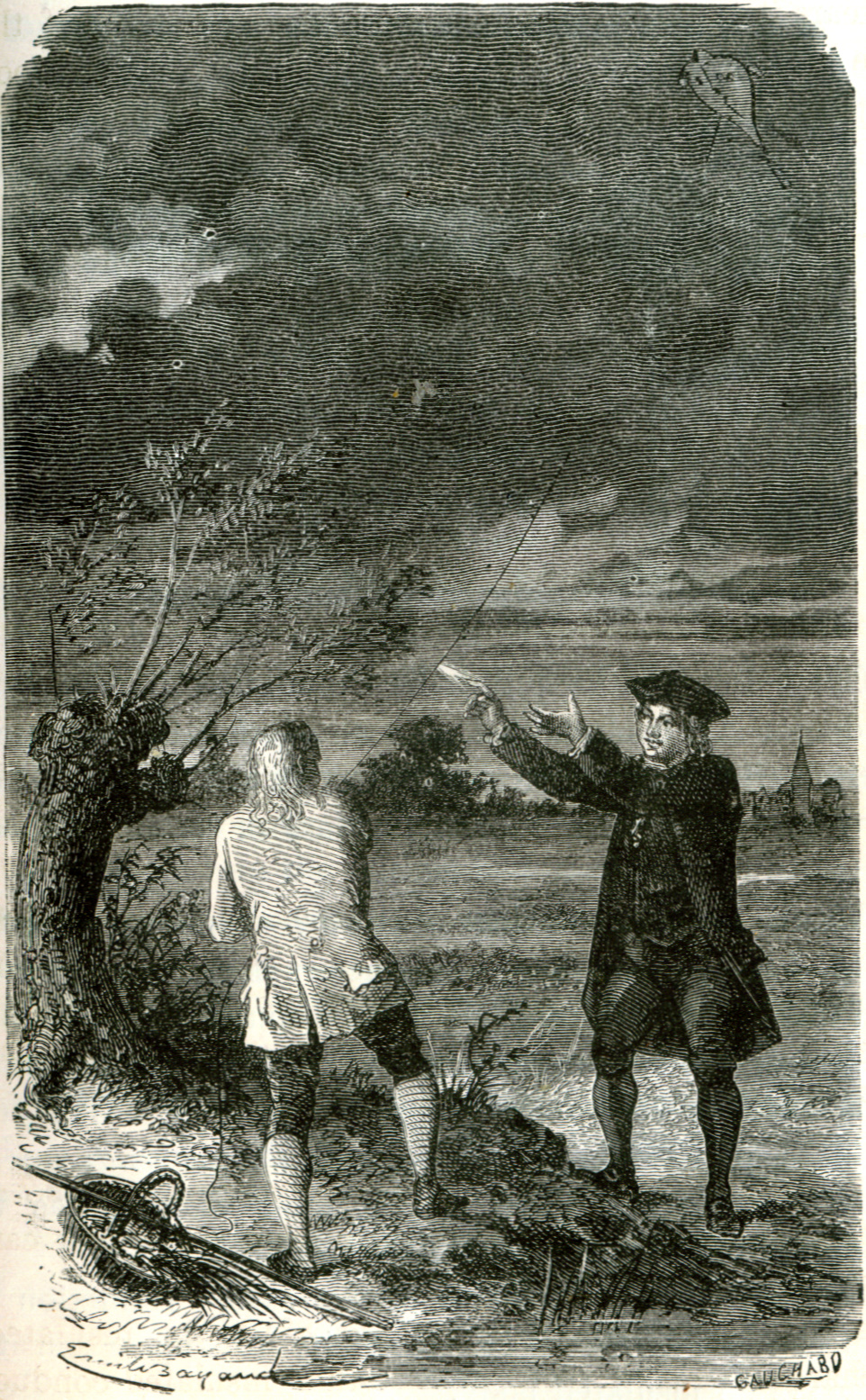
Notice the shape of the kite.

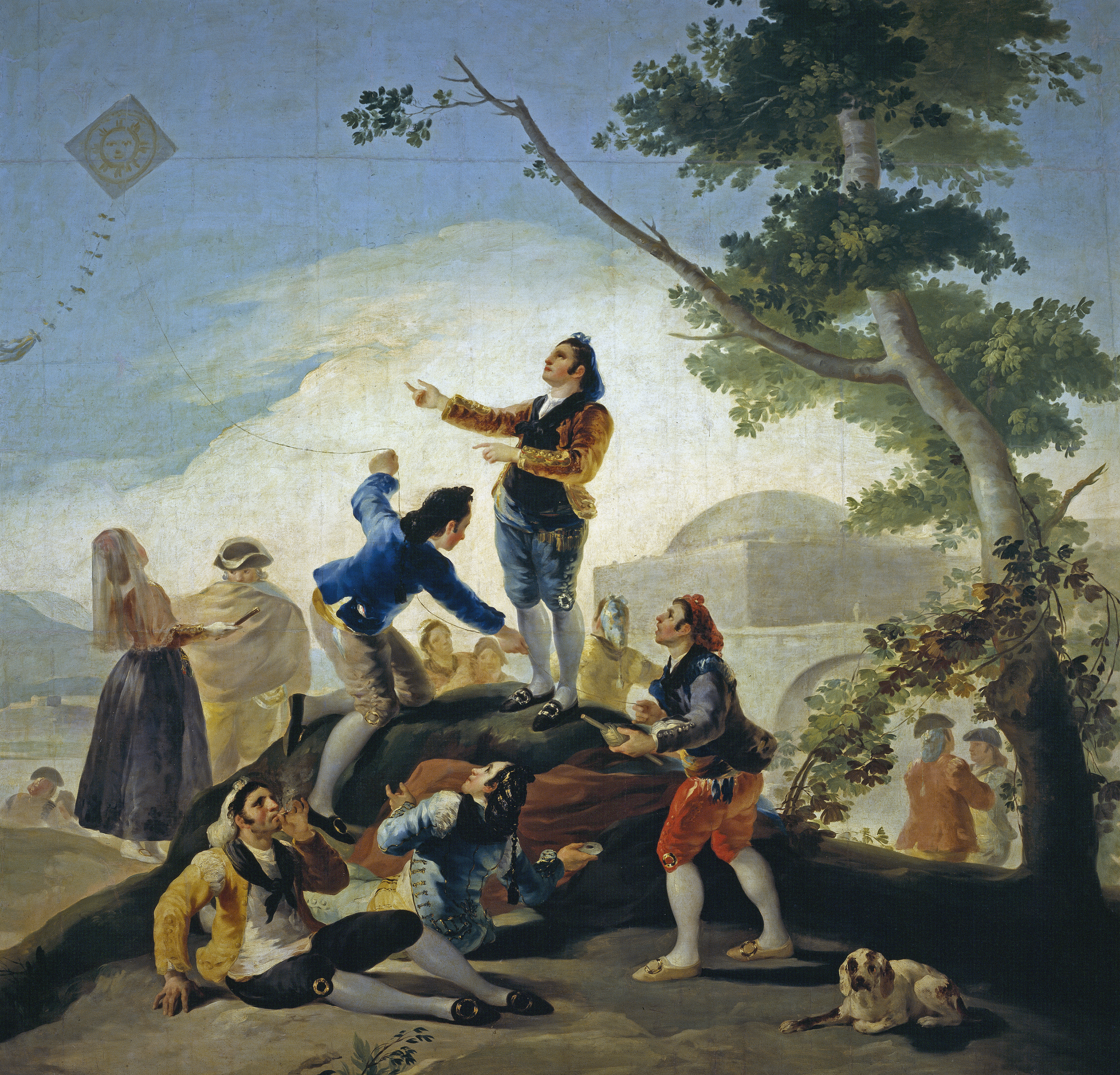
La cometa (1778) by Francisco Goya (square kite with tail)

Art kites
Video kites, kites on photographs, fine-art illustrations containing kite images, paintings, sculptures, flight-simulator images of kites, engineering drawings, sewing plans, drawings of kite plans, story illustrations in children's books, patent drawings. A Genevieve Lytton graphic card illustrated a fancy-dress-ball costume involving a hexagon kite with tail and string reel.

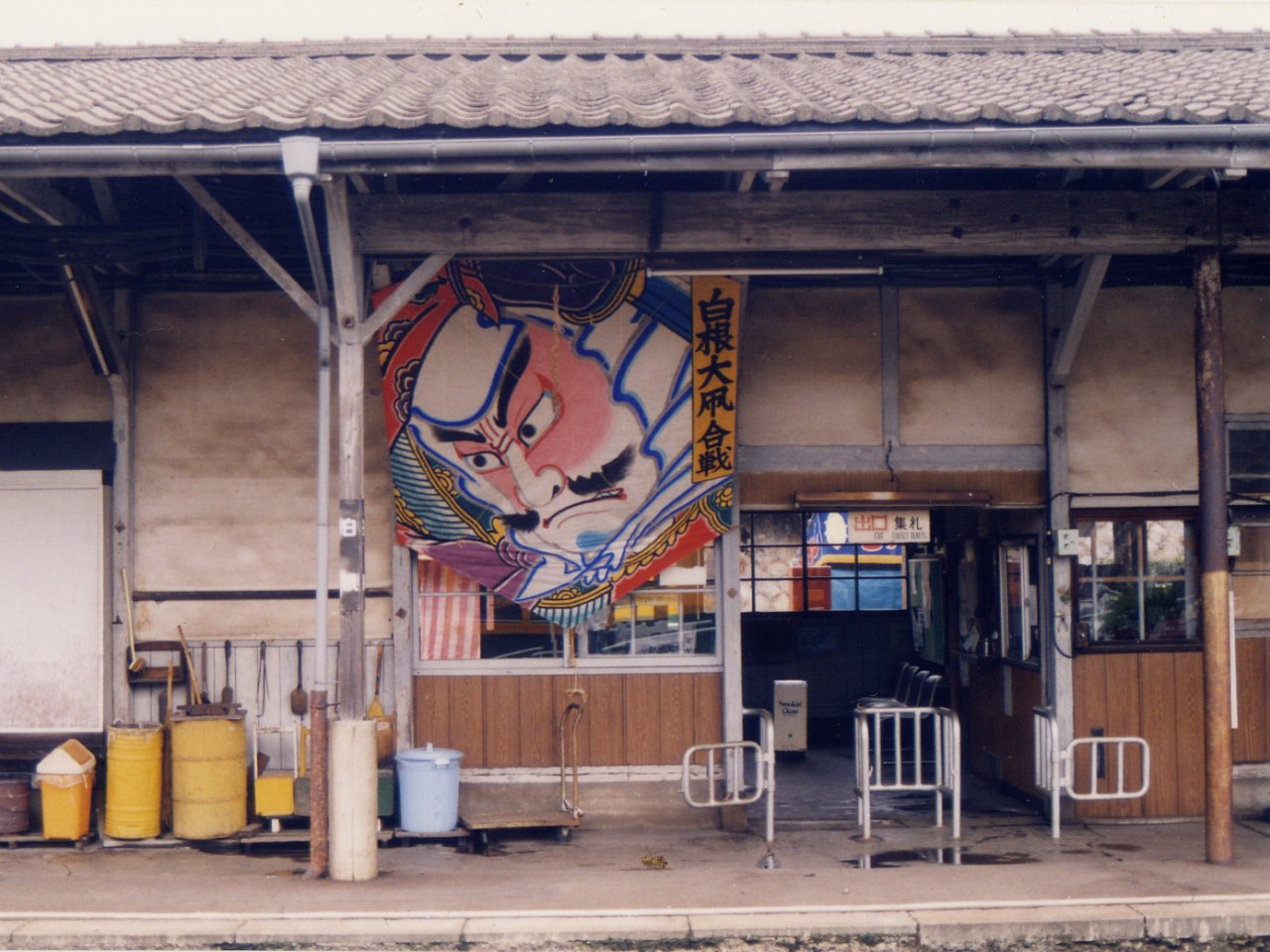
Fine art on kite wing

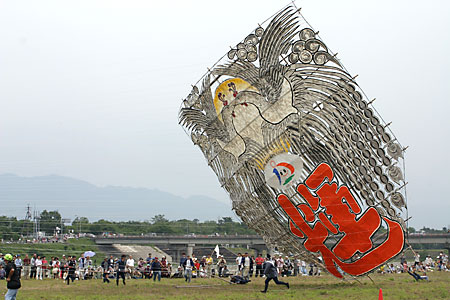
Fine art on a giant kite

Asymmetrical kites
Good kite design and construction practice includes the aim of having the left and right sides of the kite's wing be mirror images of each other, for balance. A collection of builders are exploring asymmetrical designs, which involve special challenges.
Autogyro kites
(gyro kite, heli-kite, helicopter kite) use unpowered autorotation

=== B ===
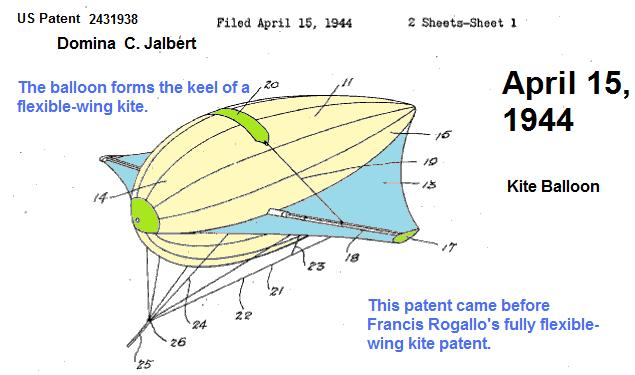
15 April 1944 kite balloon

Bag kites
Made from single or multiple bags. Some use paper bags, others plastic. Bags simply as a source of material is a trivial use; other bag kites retain much of the form of the bag.
Balloon kites
Applies to both lighter- and heavier-than-air kite types. The lighter-than-air balloon kite is the kytoon, which is aloft whether or not the wind blows. When the kytoon is not kiting, it floats aloft as a pure balloon; when it is kiting, it is a true kite. Kytoons are used to loft radio antennas, rescue signals, and kite-line laundry.
Balloon kite with "ballooning" spiderlings
Not a mechanical balloon, but a collection of spider-silk threads used for dispersal of spiders. Richard Miller, in his 1967 book Without Visible Means of Support, described the mechanics of the double-kite system where the upper kite lifts and drags, coupled with the lower kite that lifts downwards and drags; the common kiteline results in a kiting system in free flight. In the chapter, "Flying Kites", he writes that in the nineteenth century Hiram Stevens Maxim observed the kiting of spiders; biologists continue to use the misleading term, "ballooning". Bug-hunter Darrell Ubick correctly recognized that ballooning spiders actually are kiting, as noted by Pamela S. Turner in "Super-Powered Spiders". In Tales with Tails: Storytelling the Wonders of the Natural World, Kevin Strauss demonstrates in three places (pages 184, and 185 and 187) his understanding of the "kiting" of the "ballooning" spider (since no true balloon is ever made). Three staffers of the Straight Dope Science Advisory Board in Are Cobwebs Made By Spiders? recognized the kiting of ballooning spiders. A pest-control company has studied spiders and asserts it is kiting that is done by instars (spiderlings), even though the historical term is ballooning. The Rare Species Conservatory affirms that ballooning spiders actually do not balloon, but kite.
Barish sailwing
Barn Door Kites

Barn door kites are very similar to an eddy kite except that barndoor have two vertical diagonal spars in contrast to the diamond's single vertical spar.

Beginner kites
Kites of this type are separated by sellers, makers, and leaders.
Bell kites
Developed by Alexander Graham Bell
Bermuda kite
Traditional Bermudian kites flown at Easter; world-record holders for altitude and flight duration
Biplane kites
Bird kites
Abstract or realistic-looking bird kites, dynamic bird kites, bird art on kite faces
Boat kites
A 1930 Peel Glider Boat was kited on a 1000-foot line, and would get about three miles of air-gliding distance after releasing its kite line. Many contemporary inflated boats being kited begin and end their kited session as towed boats.
Bowed kite
This term has several meanings: a class of parafoil kite, an early British bowing-top-edge-sparred kite, and the rotating-ribbon rainbow-like two-anchor one-line arch kite. Distinguished from Sky Bow or rotating-ribbon kites and arch-bow stick kites

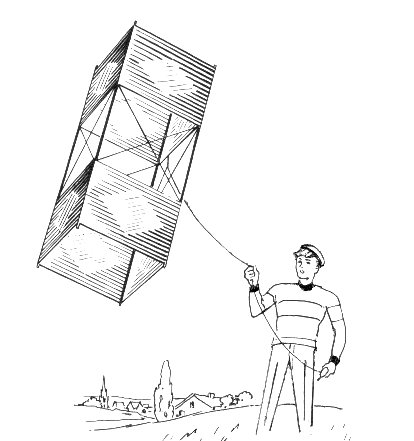
Box kite

Box kite (square section, two stacked cells)

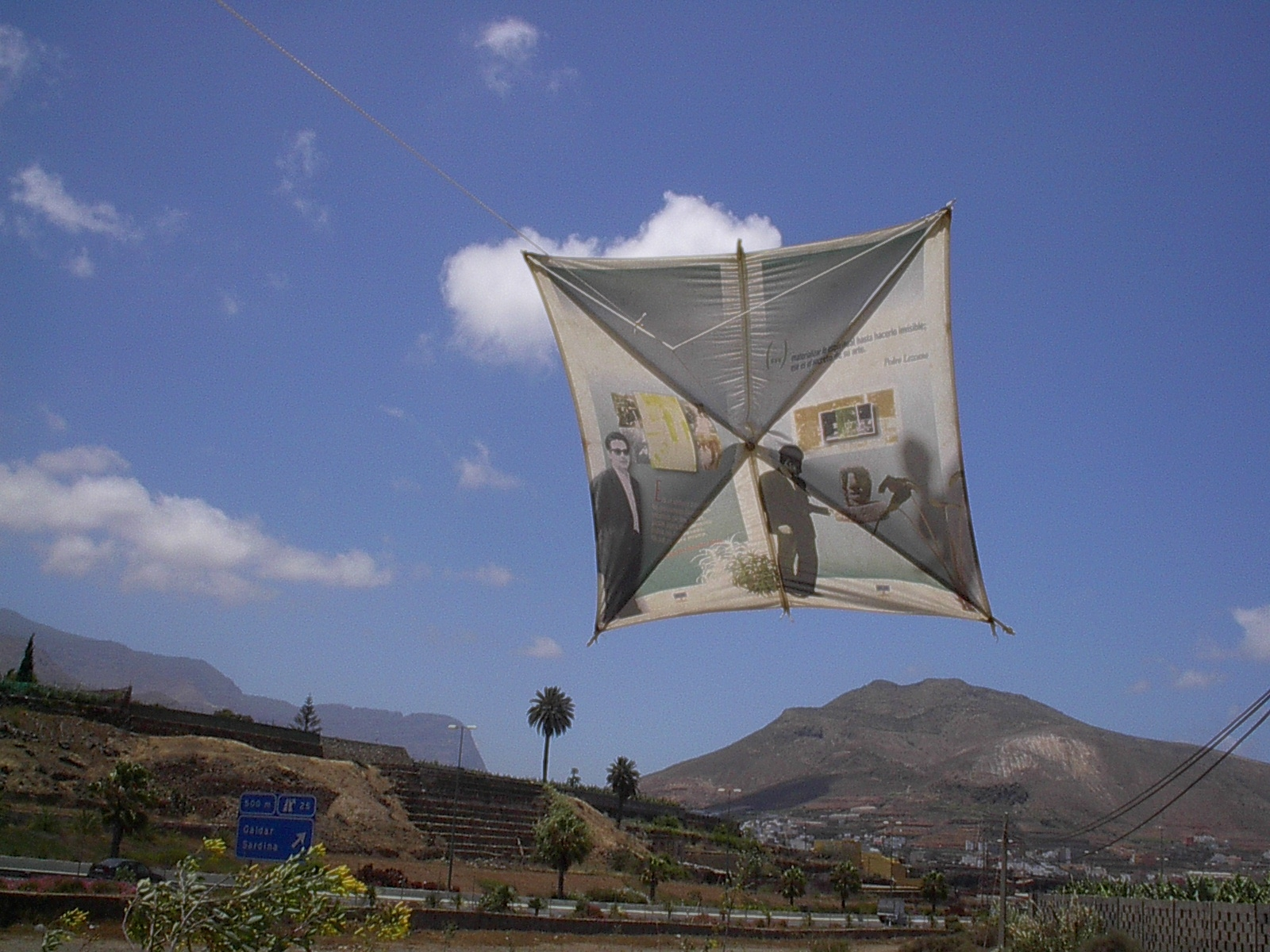
Two-stick square kite

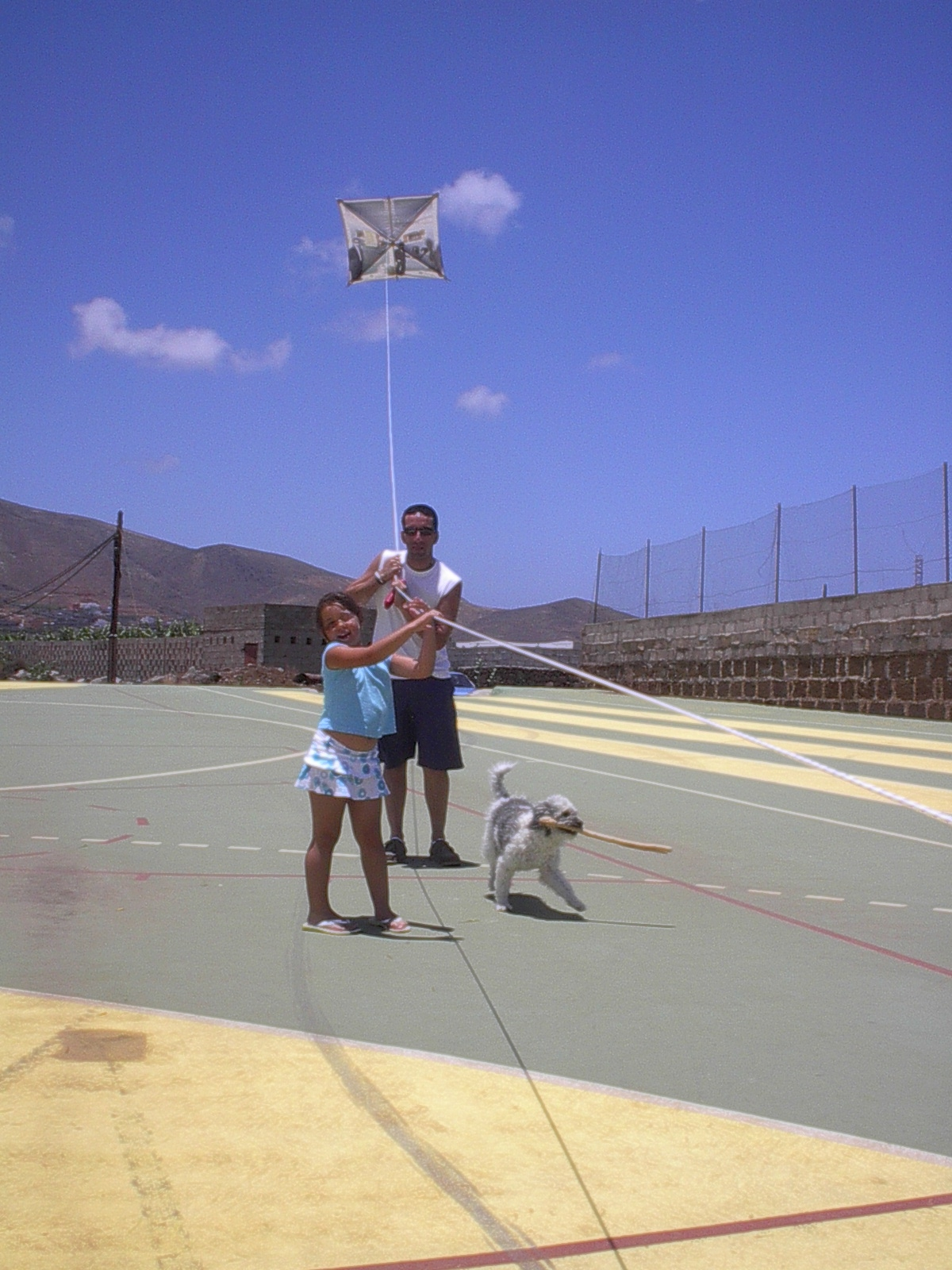
Square kite for family fun

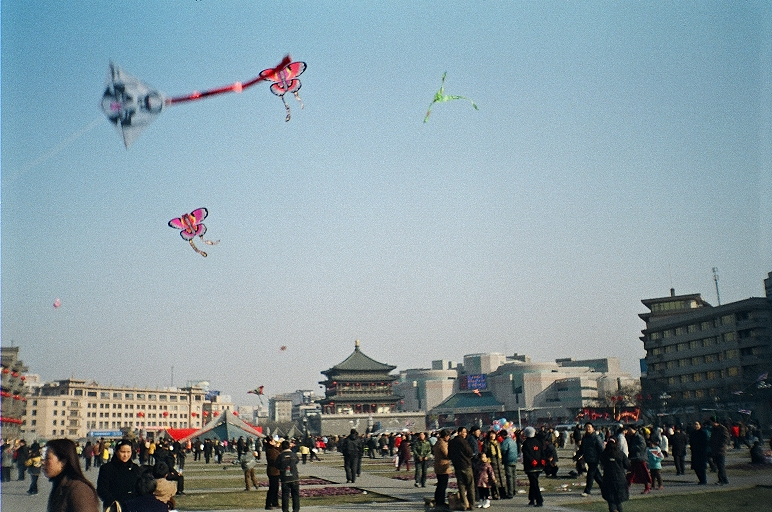
Chinese figure kites

Box kite
Box Delta kites
Butterfly kites
This type occurs at several levels: art, applique, and realistic motion.

=== C ===
C-kites
Cambodian kites
The Kleng Ek kite, a Cambodian musical kite, is often flown at night; there is also a Cambodian pocket kite. Bamboo is very common for Cambodian kites. To recapture the early Cambodian kites, a book (Khmer Kites) has been published.
Candle kites
Cantonese kites
Cayley kite
reproductions of Sir George Cayleys kites
Cellular kites
Chapi-chapi
A type of kite popular in the Philippines, usually constructed from old broomsticks and newspapers.

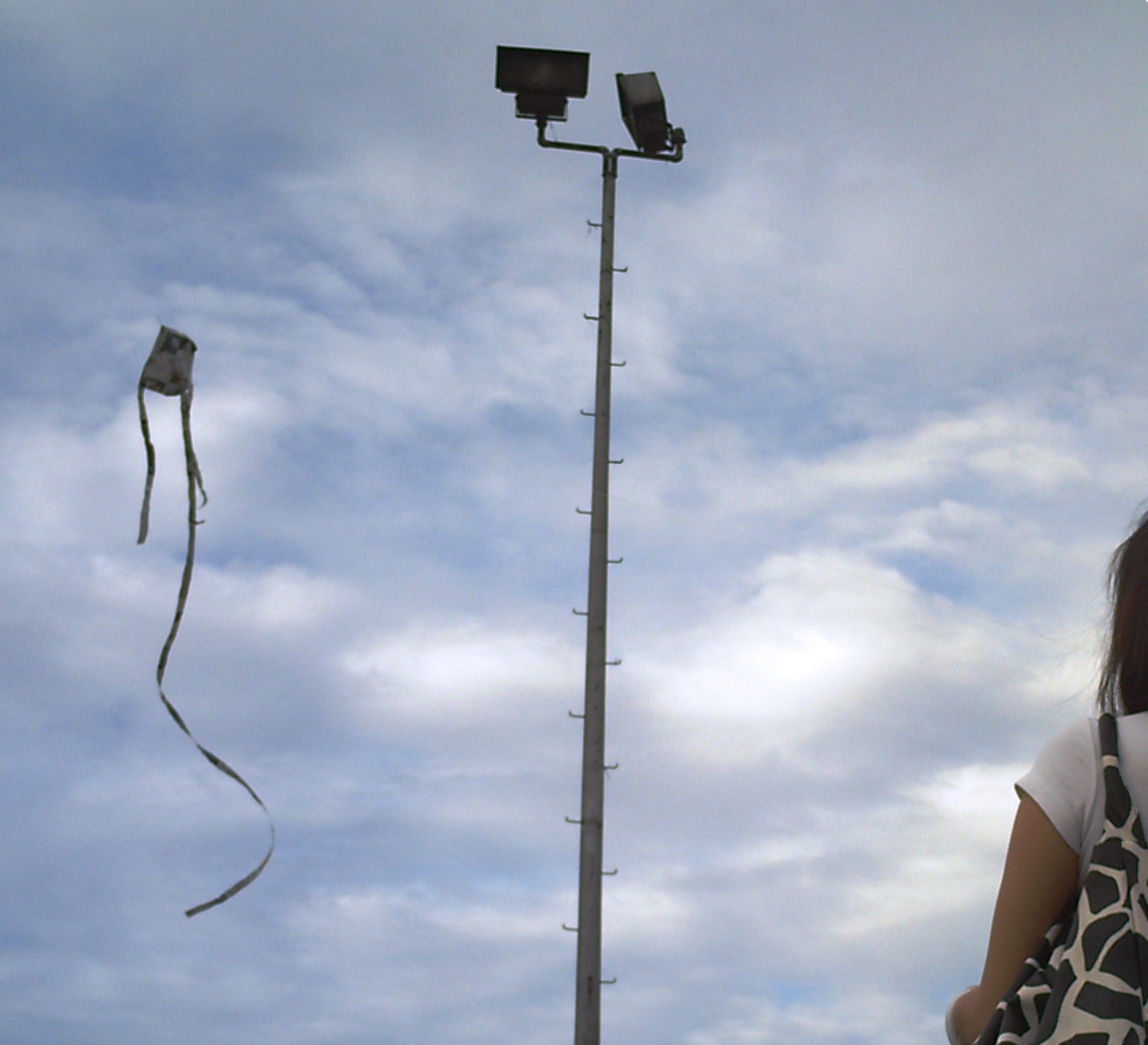
Flying a chapi-chapi at Rizal Park

Cheap kites
Available in several sectors: the home builder aiming to build kites from handy materials (even trash), and the commercial sector that aims to have some kites at low prices to attract customers
Chemiluminescence kites
Chinese kites
From Beijing, Weifang, Tianjing, Nantong, Jiangnan and Taiwan.
Circle kites
Circular kites, circle disk kites, disk kites, EPS-plate kites (see "Cup kites" below), paper-plate kites
Cody kites
War kites designed by Samuel Franklin Cody (1867–1913)
Conyne kites
Cooperative kites
are kites made by more than one person with significant contributions by each person in the cooperation effort.
Cube kites
(one or more)
Cup kites
Kites made mostly of cups, often paper or expanded polystyrene (EPS)
Cursor kites
Internet-age cursor images flown give a contemporary look to the sky.

=== D ===
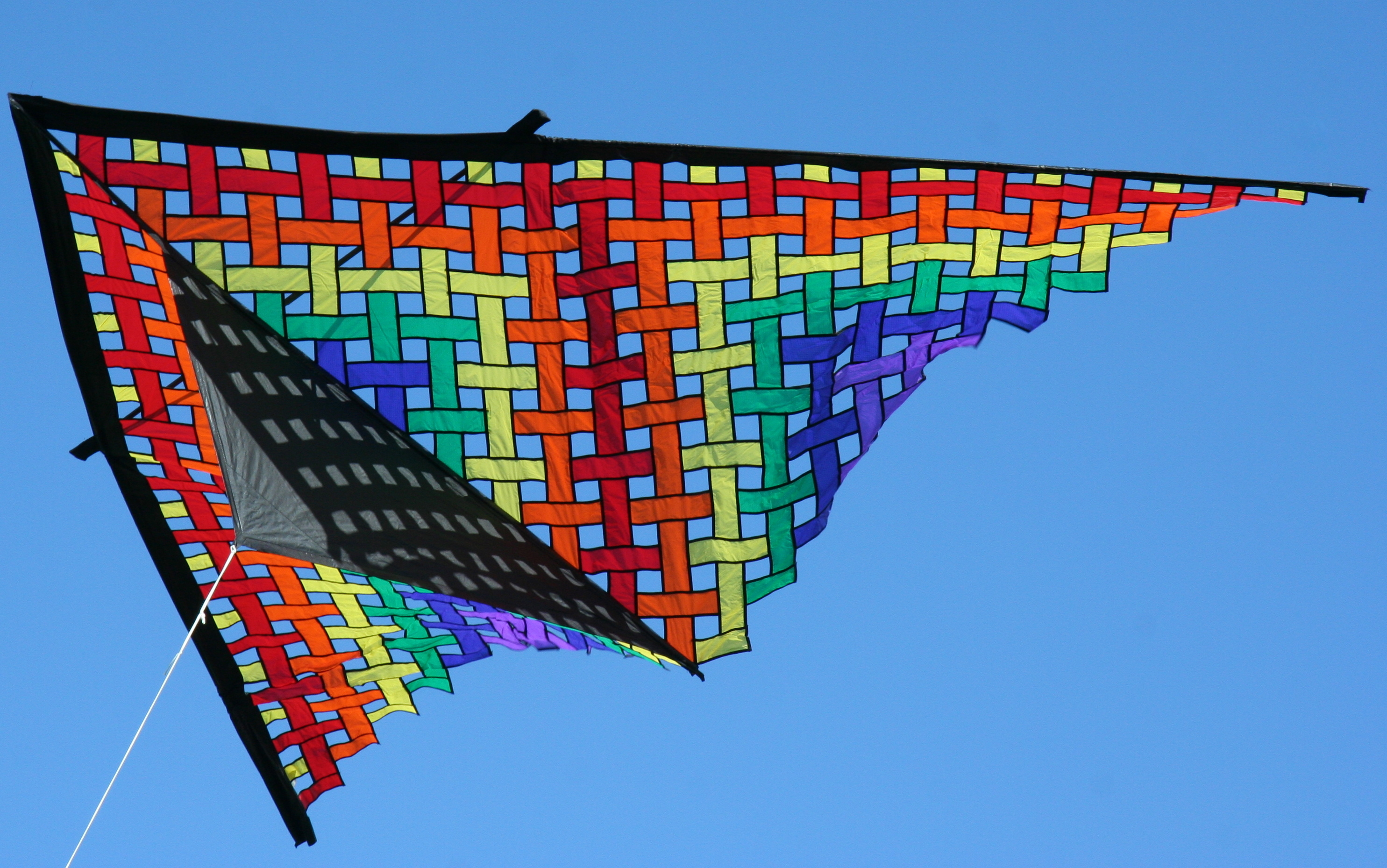
Colorful delta-wing kite

Davies kites
Single diamond colourful kites favoured in the UK
Della porta kites
This is a single-line kite which is usually square or a rectangle which contains two spars diagonally crossed.
Delta or Delta-wing kites
Single-line, dual-line stunt kites; deltas with a triangular box are a variant
Diamond kites
(see "Eddy kites" below) Diamond types appear from mini to very large, and from low-cost beginner utility to high-quality, state-of-the-art target-control diamonds.
Display kites
A class of kites "for display" has come into being for festivals, shows, library exhibitions, museum exhibitions and other events.
Disposable kites
In kite fishing, disposable kites are used. In Philippine kite fighting, the object is to destroy the opponent's kite body directly.
Duryea kite reproductions
(Charles Duryea)
Dopero or Double Pearson Roller Kites
Double-kite systems
Two coupled kites, but confined; or two coupled kites in free flight in the same (air-only or water-only, for example) or different media (air and water, for example). An example is kite-surfing with a board as a hybrid water kite, coupled with a power air kite. Without Visible Means of Support by Richard Miller (1967) details two coupled air kites, with the upper kite in the jet stream and the lower kite below the jet stream. Two (or more) kites, kite-lined to one anchor, one mooring or one kite operator, are included here. Two kites (or more) communicating with each other for a purpose are coupled.
Dragon kites
Two categories: those mimicking the figure of a dragon in a decoration or figure kite, and those of a series of kites in a train or stack.

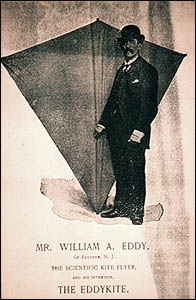
William A. Eddy with an Eddy kite

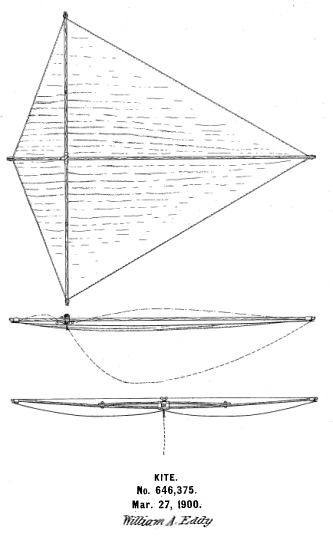
Eddy kite

=== E ===
Eddy kite or diamond kites
Edo kites
Rectangular traditional Tokyo kite. (Edo was an old name for Tokyo.)
Electricity-generating kites
There are hydro kites and air kites specifically designed to generate electricity as their dominant purpose. Also, there are kites that have electricity generation as a secondary arrangement.
Exotic kites
do not fit other categories.

=== F ===
Fast kites
Two definitions: a) kites that move fast (high-speed kites), and b) kites that can be made from scratch in a fast or quick manner (see "Q" for Quick kites). Some fighter and sport kites are built so that they can move very fast under control. Speed records are reported. Kite surfers appreciate power kites with high speed. Kites in other media like water, soil, or plasma have speeds specific to their conditions. Speed is relative to the activity and purpose. Kite-fishing requires speed.

Feather kites
Fighter kite
Figure kites
(mimic shape and appearance of animals, insects, people, objects, products)

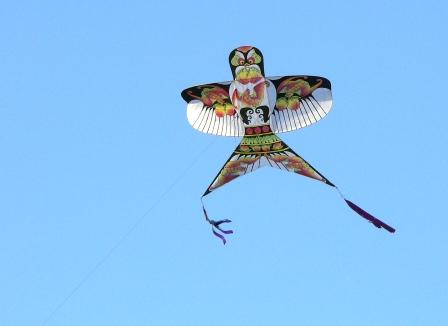
Figure (artistic) kite

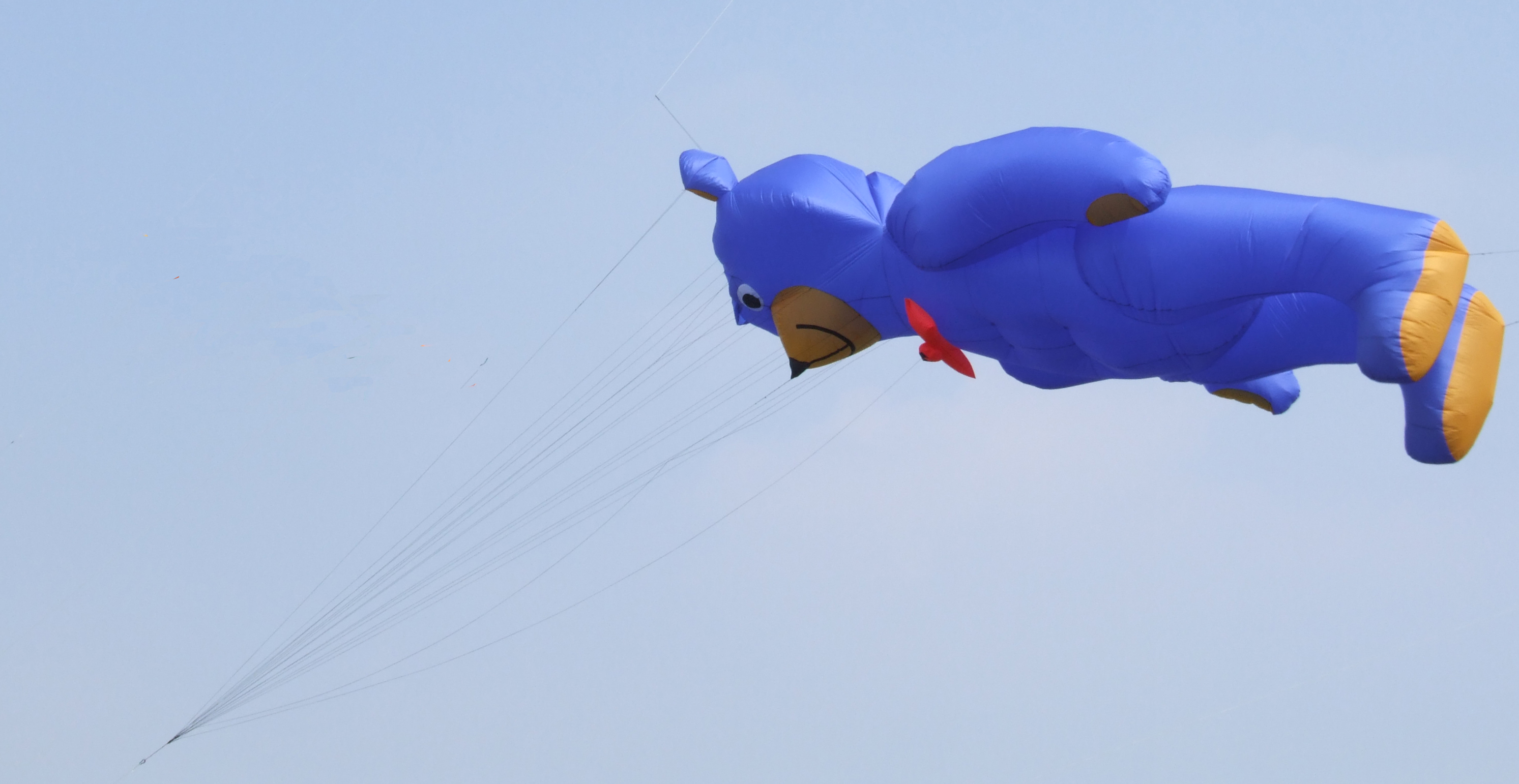
Bear

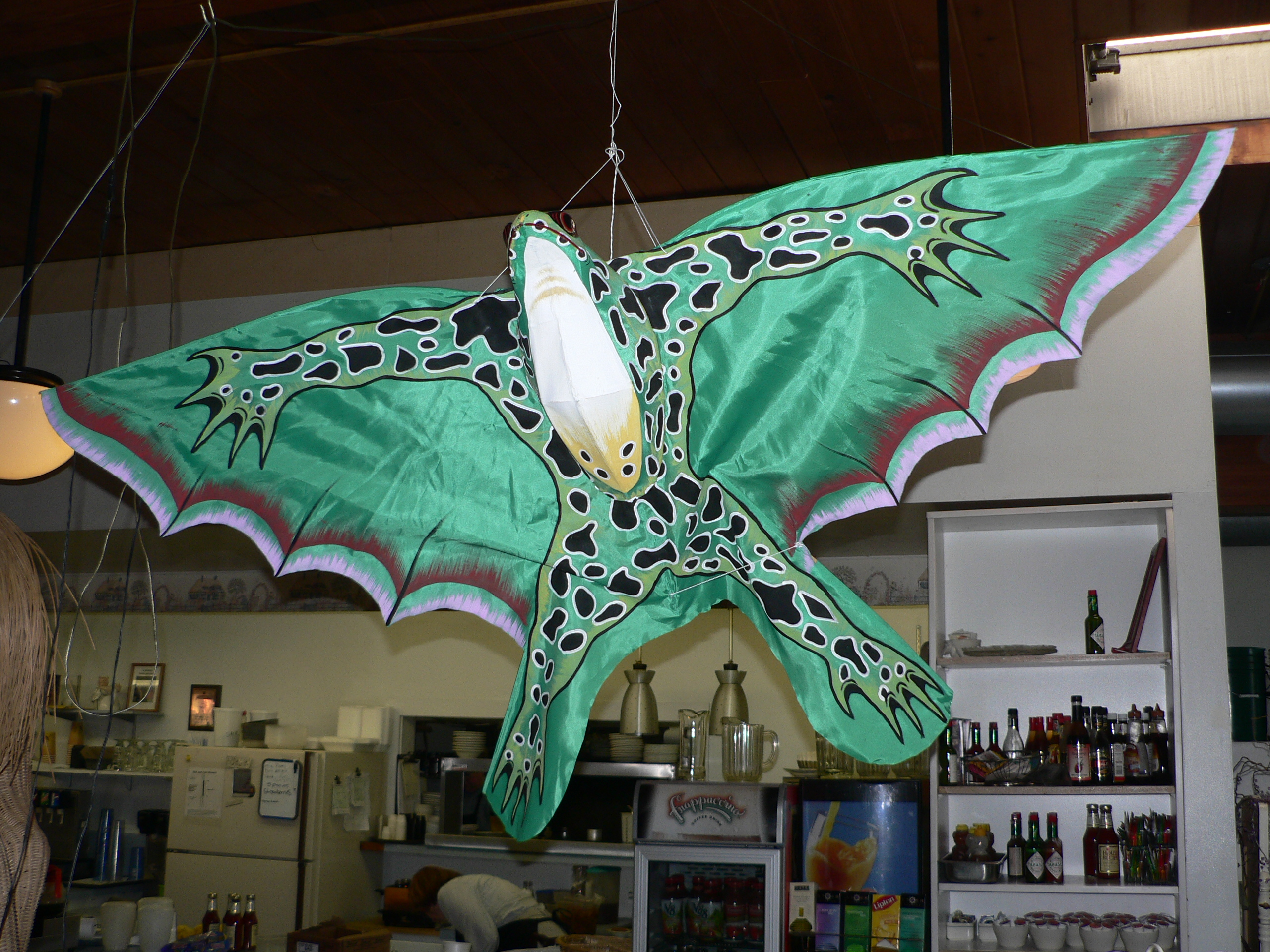
Frog

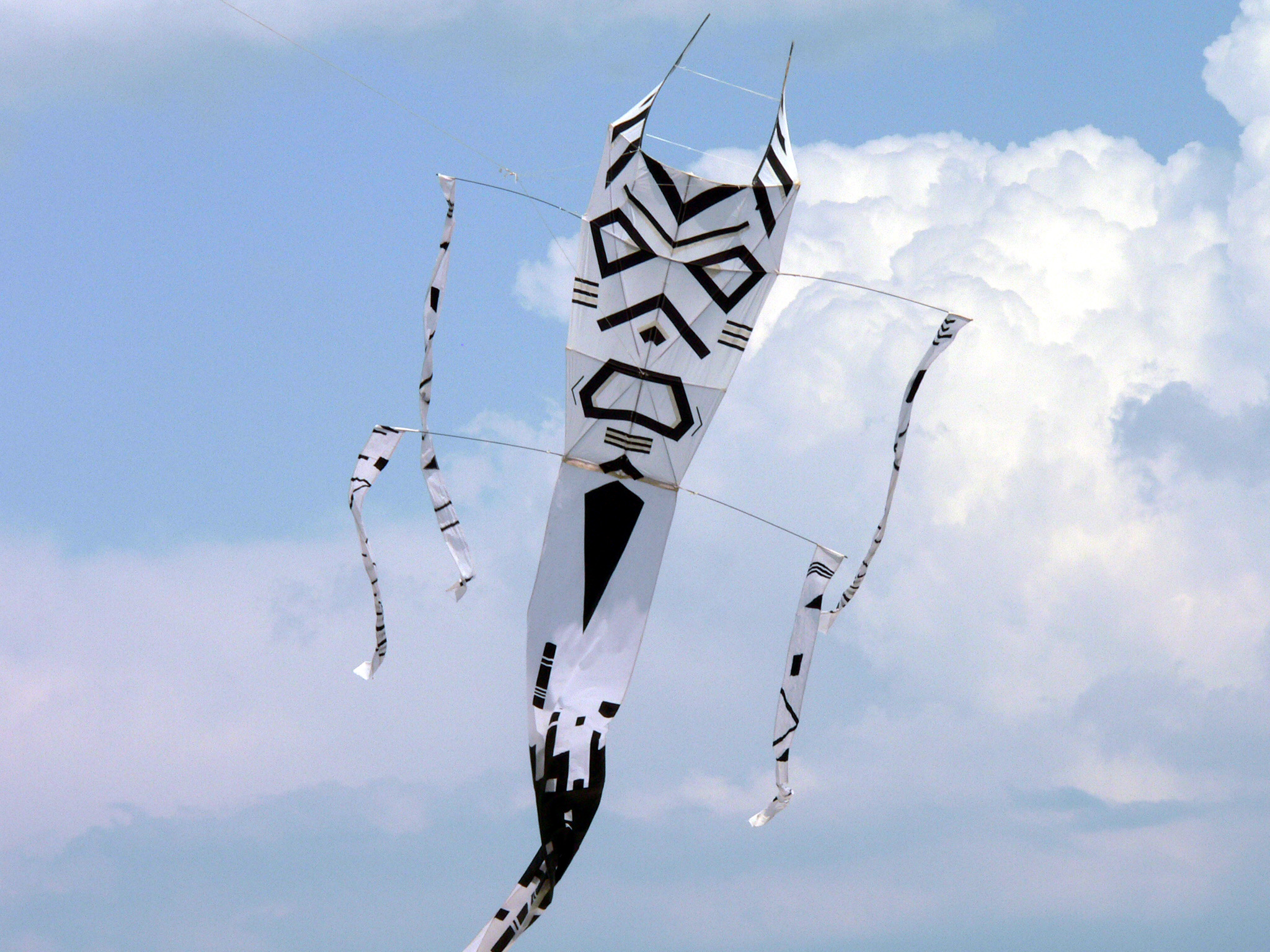
Horned Hex with tail

First kites
The first of a type. Invention kite.
Fishing kites
Some believe that there is no better way to present bait to fish than with a fishing kite
Flat kites
Flexible-wing kites
with variable amounts of stiffening by spars and rigid parts
Flexikites
and its reproductions
Flexifoil
(original and then company kites different from original).
Foil
or parafoil kite
Funny kites
These kites evoke laughter.

=== G ===
Gallaudet kites
Gallaudet Hydrokites:<Yale professor was told not to experiment with aeronautics. However his biplane kite with tail involved wing warping prior to the Wright brothers use of such control means. Edson Gallaudet formed the Gallaudet Engineering company with his brother and then Gallaudet Aircraft Company (GAC), earliest precursor to the company General Dynamics. The Gallaudet Hydrokite was the beginning of a seaplane interest of the GAC.
Garbasail
Geometric kite
Genki kite
Giant kites
Gibson Girl
was a type of cellular kite for radio antenna raising from rescue raft.
Glider kites
Manned and unmanned aircraft intended primarily for gliding are frequently tested and flown as kites under tow from ground or water vehicles or animals, machines, or other people. Some glider kites released to free-flight gliding may or may not be free-flight kites, depending on how payload may (or may not) be tugging the glider's wing through a tow line set. Primary manned gliders, kited, are glider kites when being kited; when released to glide, these are not kites. Conversely, the hang-lined hang glider pilot may be kited up in his or her aircraft but when released to free-flight, such aircraft remains a gliding kite or kite glider. The Martin Glider was kited by many different means.
Gyrocopter or helicopter kites
(see autogyro)

=== H ===
Hang glider
Usually manned. Many hang gliders are true kites; hang gliders that are not true kites are not covered here. Ed Grauel includes hang gliders in his typing of kites.
Hang glider kites that are unmanned
Unmanned kites as mimics of manned hang gliders (kites or not).
Hargrave kites
(Lawrence Hargrave)

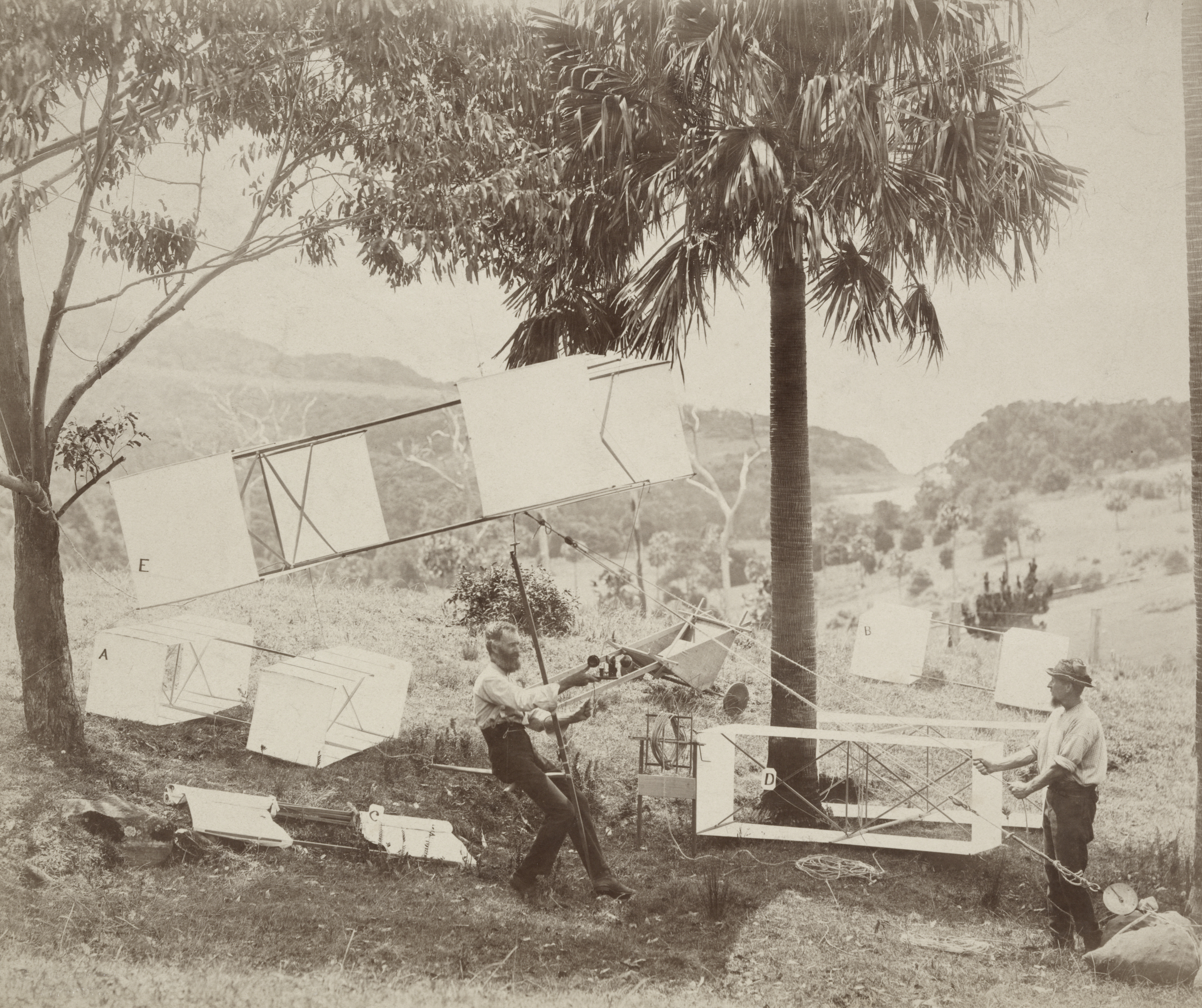
Lawrence Hargrave (seated) and Swain demonstrate the manlift kites (labelled A, B, D, & E), sling seat and spring balance in the parkland behind Stanwell Park beach, November 1894

Helikites
A aerodynamically sound kite-balloon combination filled with helium. Designed and patented in the UK and USA by Sandy Allsopp in 1993, the Helikite is a true kite, yet lighter-than air for staying aloft when kiting is insufficient for flight. Helikites can cope with a very large wind range from 0 to 60 mph, possibly the largest wind range of any kite. So they are useful where there is an absolute need for flight such as professional uses. Helikites are used for photography, scientific atmospheric monitoring, military surveillance, radio-relay, surveying, oceanic uses, bird control and antenna-lifting.
Hexagonal kites
US 51860 patent was for a hexagonal kite by T. Perrins, granted 2 January 1866. A Birt kite may have preempted, in fact, the same kite. Ed Grauel opines that the Birt kite at the Kew Observatory preempted the Perrins kite; he noted that the same kite later became known as the barndoor or house kite..
High aspect ratio kites
Tow-launched hobby unmanned sailplanes are true kites during high-start kited launches; they may hold the record for single-line single-anchor high aspect ratio kites made by humans. However, the rotating ribbon single-line double-anchored Skybow kite (rotating ribbon arch kite of two anchors) that sits in the sky nearly as a rainbow is a kite with extreme aspect ratio. A different non-rotating ribbon kite by Anders Ansar follows the Barish sailwing concept to the extreme; Ansar suggests more than two anchor points. He also explains how two sailors holding a ribbon kite, e g on ice wearing ice skates, can sail straight upwind or straight down wind, the latter faster than the wind.
Historical kites
Historical kites are builds that aim to match some historically important kite, sometimes to represent the first occurrence of a particular kite design. Patent kites are a subset of historical kites where the aim is to build a kite that materially illustrates a claim in a kite patent.
Hydro kites
Water kites – kites that fly in water or on the surface of water.

=== I ===
India kites
Indoor kites
May be confused with zero-wind kites.
Inflatable single-line kites
Distinguish between closed-bladder inflated kites (sausage balloon kite, other-form balloon kites) from open-bladder ram-air inflation (Jalbert parafoil and its derivatives) and the single-surface flexible-sail dynamic inflation (Rogallo and Barish wings). A kite can have two or three types of inflation parts (Jalbert's 1944 patent claimed a kite that had the closed-cell inflation as well as a sailwing part). Over-water flying applications have invited air kites having light-than-water flotation capability; power-kiting for kitesurfing with leading-edge-inflated (LEI) bladder held inside textile pocket is one such use. Another is in fishing kites

Invisible kites
(radar-invisible, very-low-visibility translucents, out-of-sights, non-lighted night kites, imagined kites, kites flown by the blind as they feel the line tension change)

=== J ===
Jalbert parafoil kites
after inventions of Domina Jalbert
Japanese kites

Java kites
(pre-Malay kite, pre-Eddy kite)
Jesus kites
This type of kite is found in both art and flying kites. Aquilone di Gesù kites use art on standard kite forms or specialized figure kites. In the Philippines, noted kitemaker Eulogio Catahan is a leader in Jesus kites.

=== K ===
Kid kites
This type of kite is fit for young kids. Both hobby authors and commercial suppliers note this type of kite.

Killer kites
Three types of killer kites are recognized in kiting. One type of killer kite has the task of taking out of flight another kite; such is in sport and also in practical kite energy operations to take out a kite that is fugitive. Another killer kite regards the notorious kites that cause death and injury; some nations' kite festivals have been marred or cancelled because of killer kites; governments have gotten involved to halt or slow the effect of killer kites. The kite's glassed lines or the kite's metallic base material have resulted in far too many deaths and injuries. Death by kites is part of the reason the world knows this kite type. Another type of "killer kite" are those that simply deeply astound viewers and users with some unique exciting quality.

Kirby kites
(also known as a bird kite – a variant of the Malay kite) (not to be confused with the manned glider called the Kirby Kite, which was a kite launched into a gliding or soaring session) (also not to be confused with the radio-controlled Airworld Kirby Kite scale glider, which has a kite life when being given a kited launch)
KiteSail by Maurice Grenier
KiteShip by Dave Culp.
Korean kites
Kytoon
A shaped balloon that kites (two general types: 1) lighter-than-medium, in which it moves within a gravity field 2) heavier-than-air kytoon, or heavier than the medium in which it flies. Density is implied when saying "heavier"-than-the-ambient medium). For air, some kytoons are less dense than air (using hydrogen, helium, heated air); other kytoons filled with, for example, unheated air are not buoyant in still air but are still kited. Includes barrage kites of the kytoon type that Domina Jalbert designed for defense purposes and peacetime antenna-lifting by ham-radio operators. Car dealers raise advertisements with kytoons (see Observation balloon. The kytoon is a true kite in flight in an appropriate moving stream of material, fluid, gas, or air; it is also a true balloon

=== L ===
- LaddermillA complex of sub-kites in a loop line with various uses, one of which is the generation of electricity; invented by Dr. Ockels of Delft University.

Landboarding kites
Kite landboarding uses traction and power kites.
Lang kites
Langley kites
See Samuel Langley
Leaf kites
(traditional, decorative artistic mimic, fishing leaf or novel)
LEI kites
Leading-edge-inflated kite

LEI power kite (video)

Lighter-than-air kites
Light-emitting kites
Chemiluminescence kites, electrically lighted kites (battery and also real-time in-kite generated electricity for the lights, light-reflection kites
Low aspect ratio kites

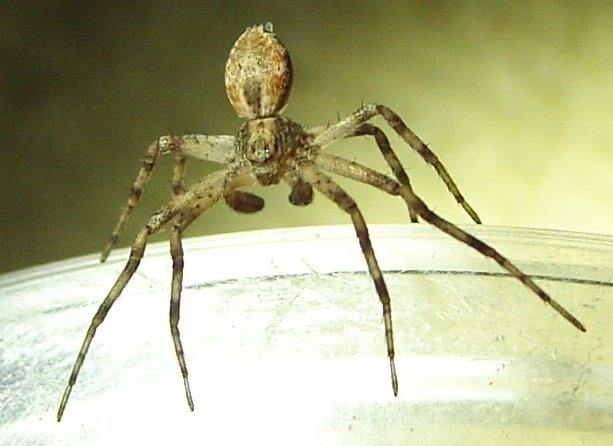
Silk extruded is thin and long

Spider gossamer kites made of spider silk are low-aspect-ratio kites made by a spider. Man-made long sausage-balloon kites are low-aspect-ratio kites.

=== M ===
Machijirushi kites
fine paper and bamboo from Hamamatsu continue, after centuries of use in celebration and town kite-fighting.
Magnus effect kites
rotate span-wise.
Malay kites
(pre-Eddy kite)
Manned
Man-lifting kites
Maori kites
Miniature kites
Over 800 miniature kites were on display in 1999 at the Muncie Convention Center in Muncie, Indiana, USA for the world's largest such event; it was called the AKA Miniature Kite Art Gallery. Also known as tiny kites, small kites, or little kites.

Musical kites
The Cambodian Ek (Khlèng-Phnorng or Khlèn-Èk) musical kite is an enduring part of the rural Cambodian culture.

=== N ===
Night kites
Novelty kites
Novelty kites bring vitality to kite-building and flying. Festivals frequently have an award category for novelty kites.

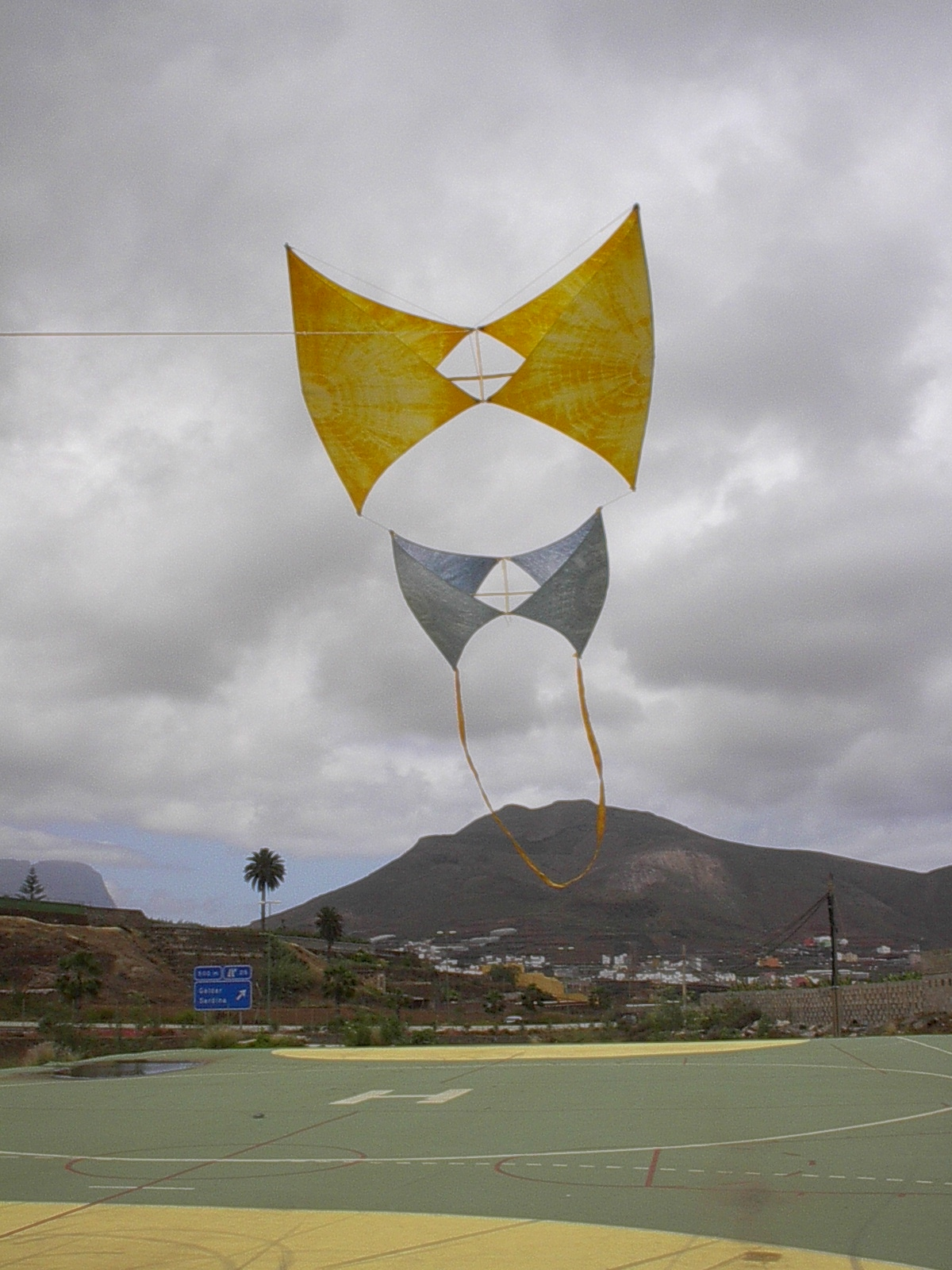
Novelty kite, by Carl von Canstein

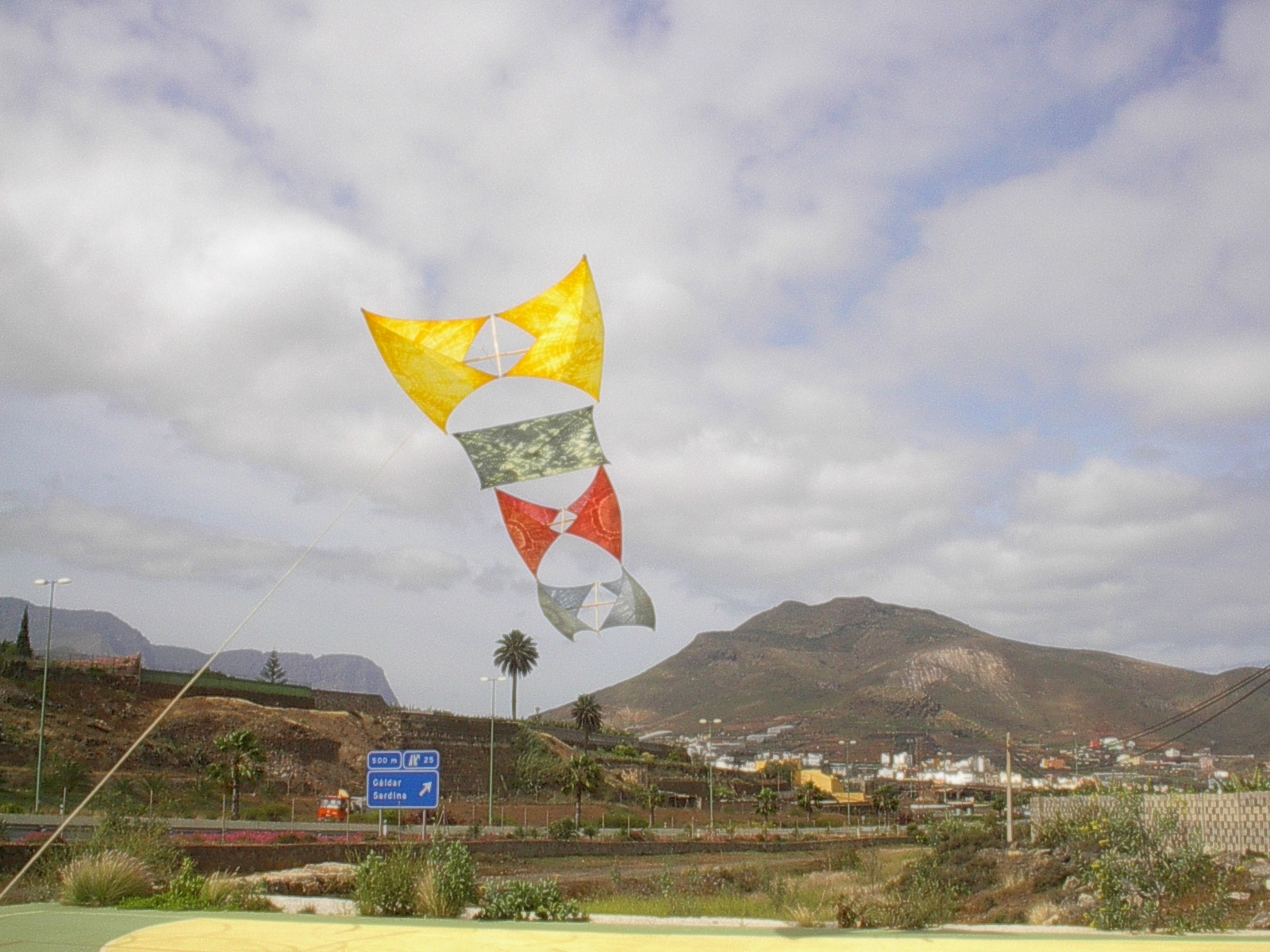
Novelty kite, by Carl von Canstein

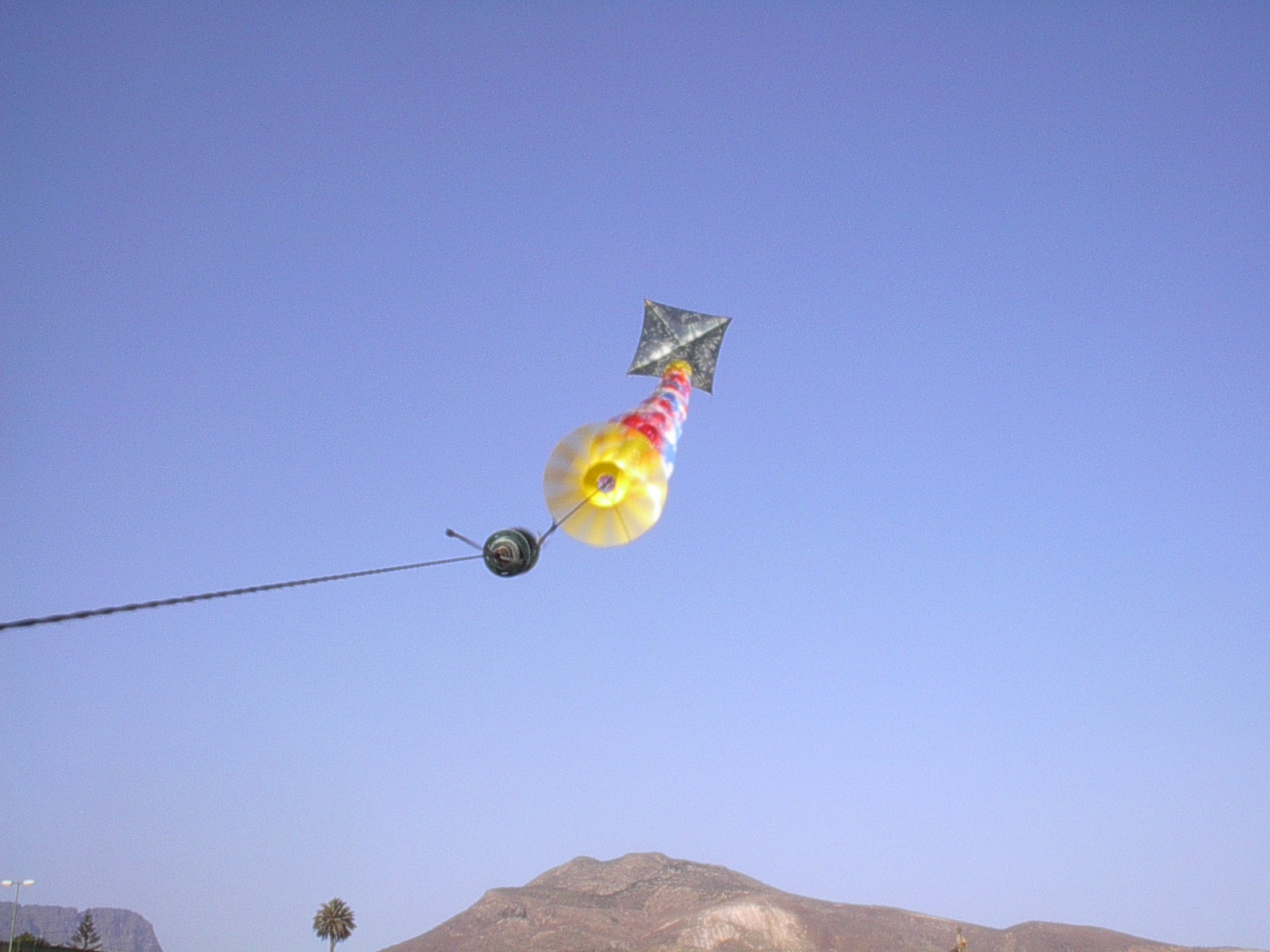
Novelty kite with multiple kite-line rotors, by Carl von Canstein

=== O ===
Octagonal kites
Four-stick octagonal kites exist; collapsible eight-stick kites that pop up like a common umbrella have been registered in patents. A fine-art example of an eight-sided regular octagonal kite is illustrated. Stop-sign and octagonal box kites are other examples.
Octopus kites
Figure mimic of octopus

=== P ===
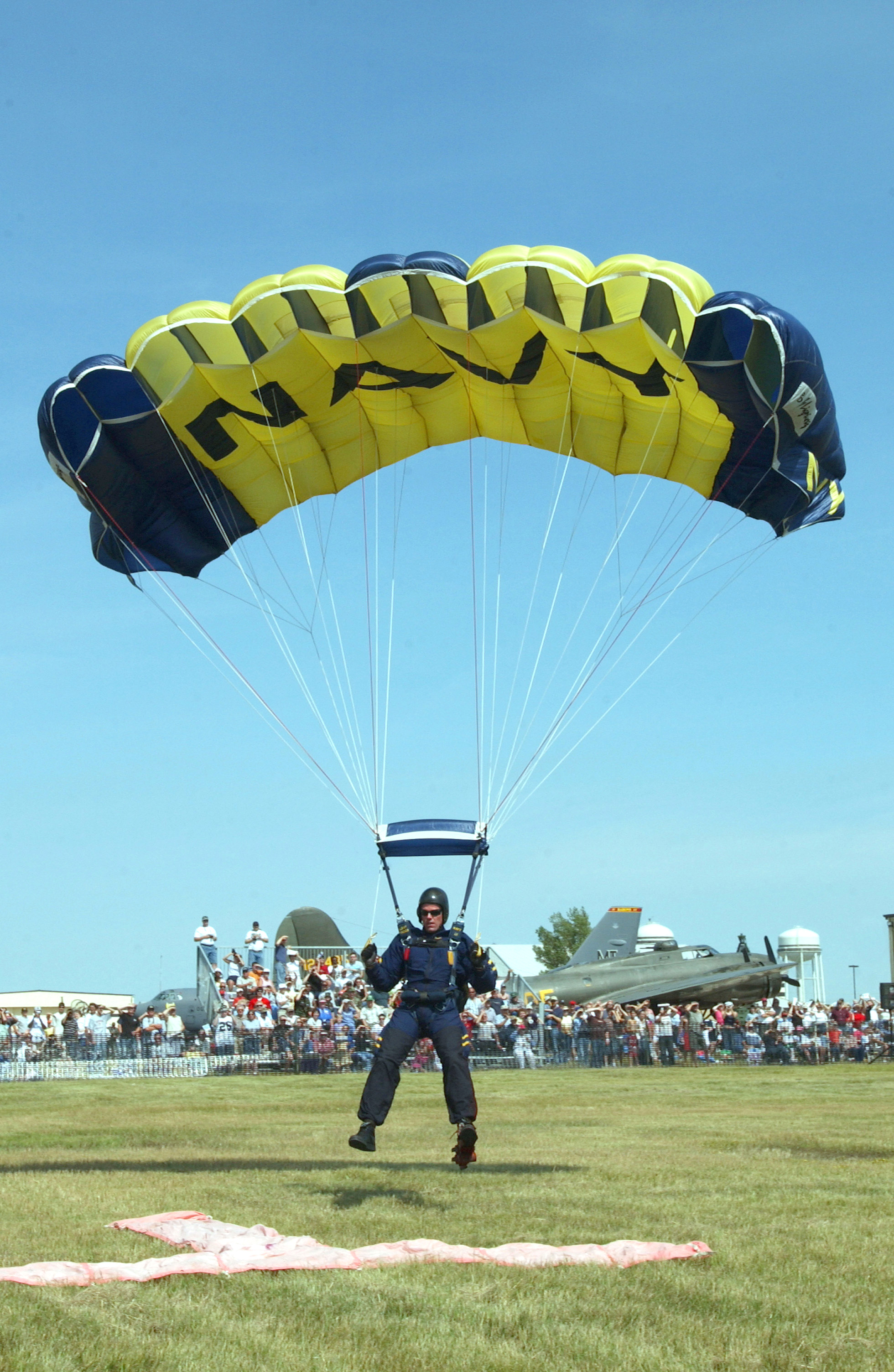
Parachute kite; this Jalbert Parafoil wing is kited. Sail-loading is high, but lift/drag ratio is positive so kiting occurs; main purpose not sustained paragliding, though gliding occurs from kited wing.

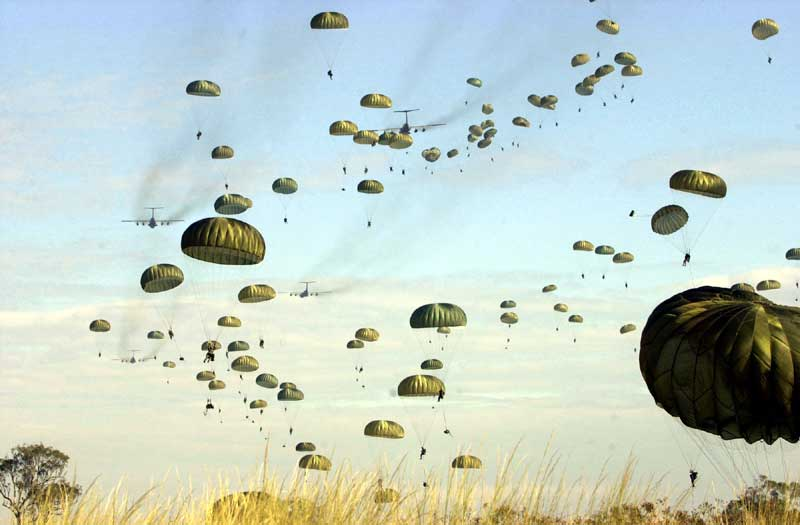
Non-kite conical parachutes with zero glide angle, thus no kite deflection

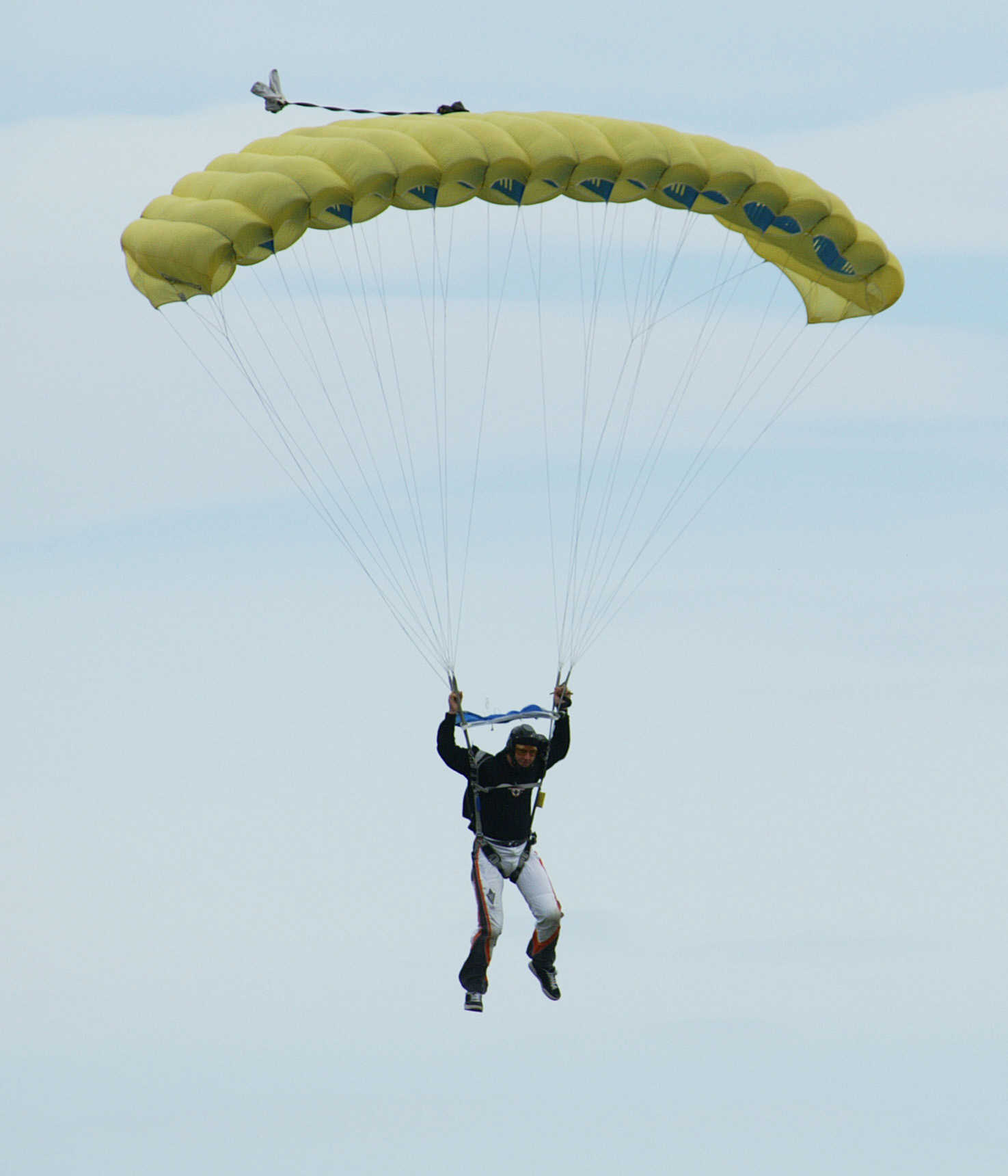
Parachute that is true kite, with positive lift/drag ratio

Parachute kites
(see paraglider below) Parachutes that have a directional venting small (parasail, directional parachutes) or massive (Jalbert parafoil, Rogallo parawing) are kites moored to free-falling body or payload. Symmetrical, non-directional zero-lift/drag ratio parachutes are streamers and not kites; no net deflection from the stream occurs in a true parachute.
Parafoil
Parafoil stunt kites

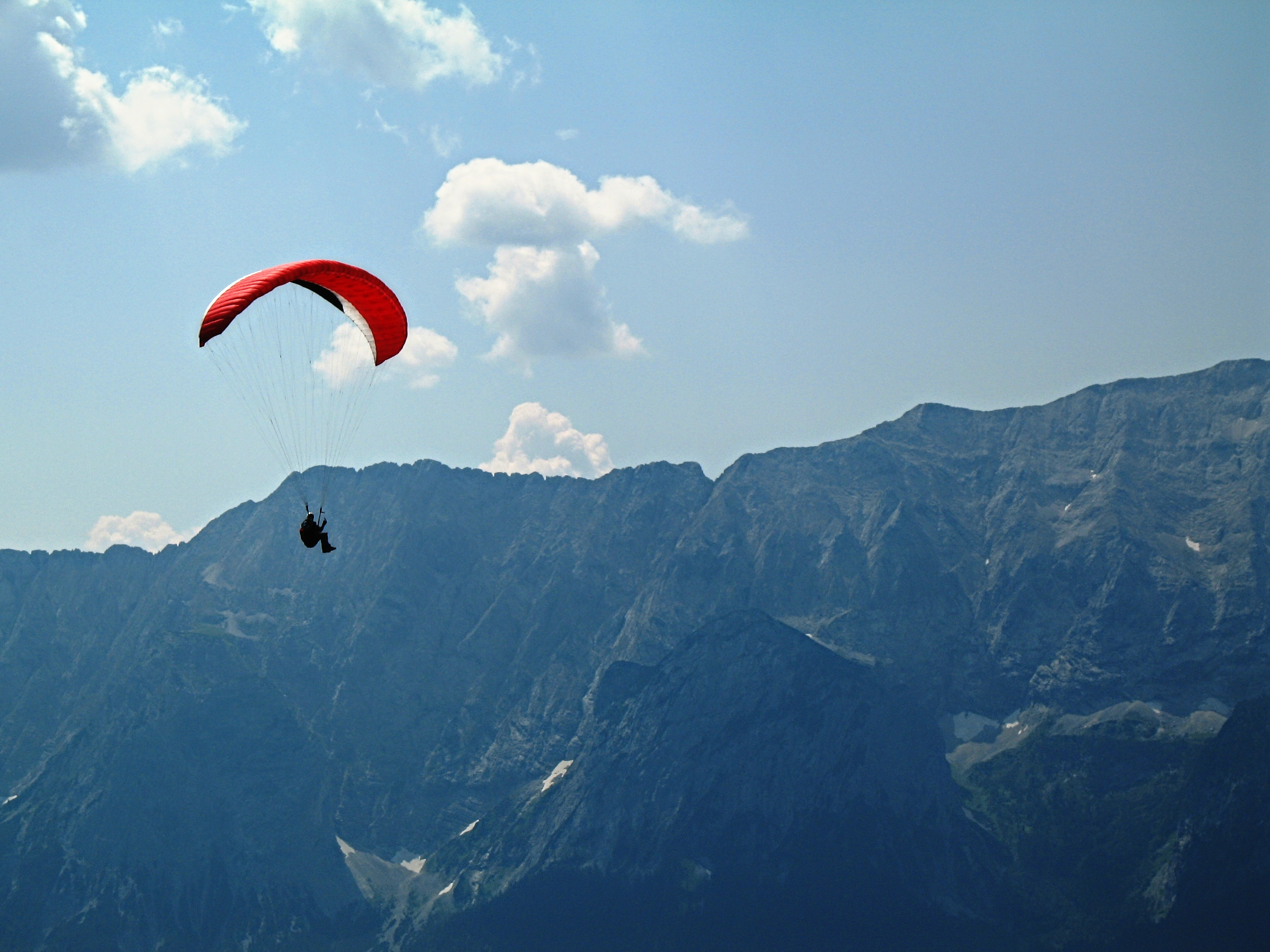
Note kite's wing and many kite lines held by human operator; operator moves by gravity (paraglider kite system)

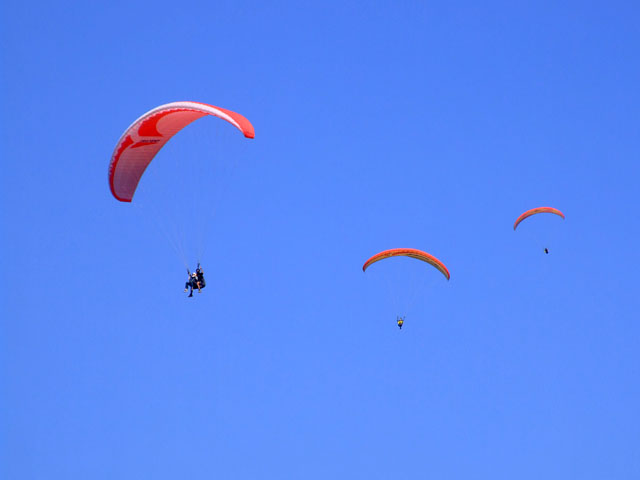
Several kites in free flight; paraglider kites can remain kiting in thermal and slope updrafts for hours.

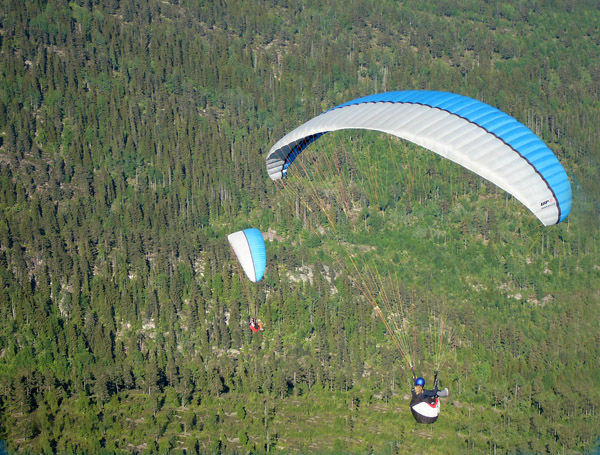
Kite's wing is derivation of Domina Jalbert's ram-air airfoiled wing.

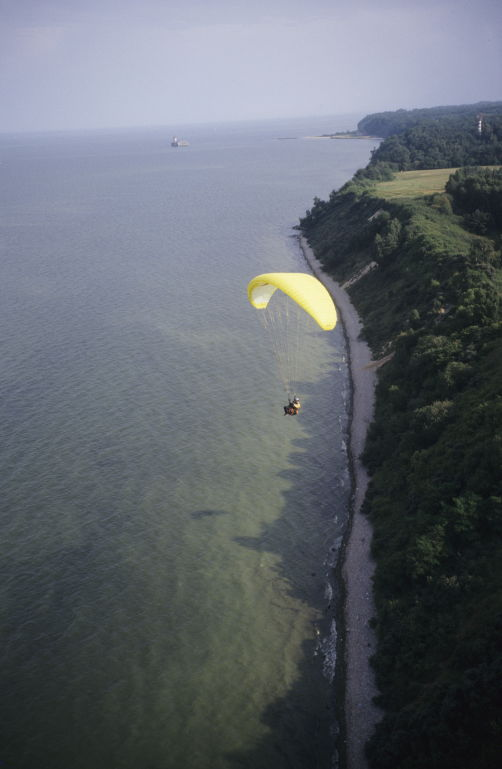
Pilots have operated paragliders for hundreds of miles.

Paraglider
manned (these are kites both in free-fall, and kited either by the pilot or secondarily by a towing or moored device or powered harness system).

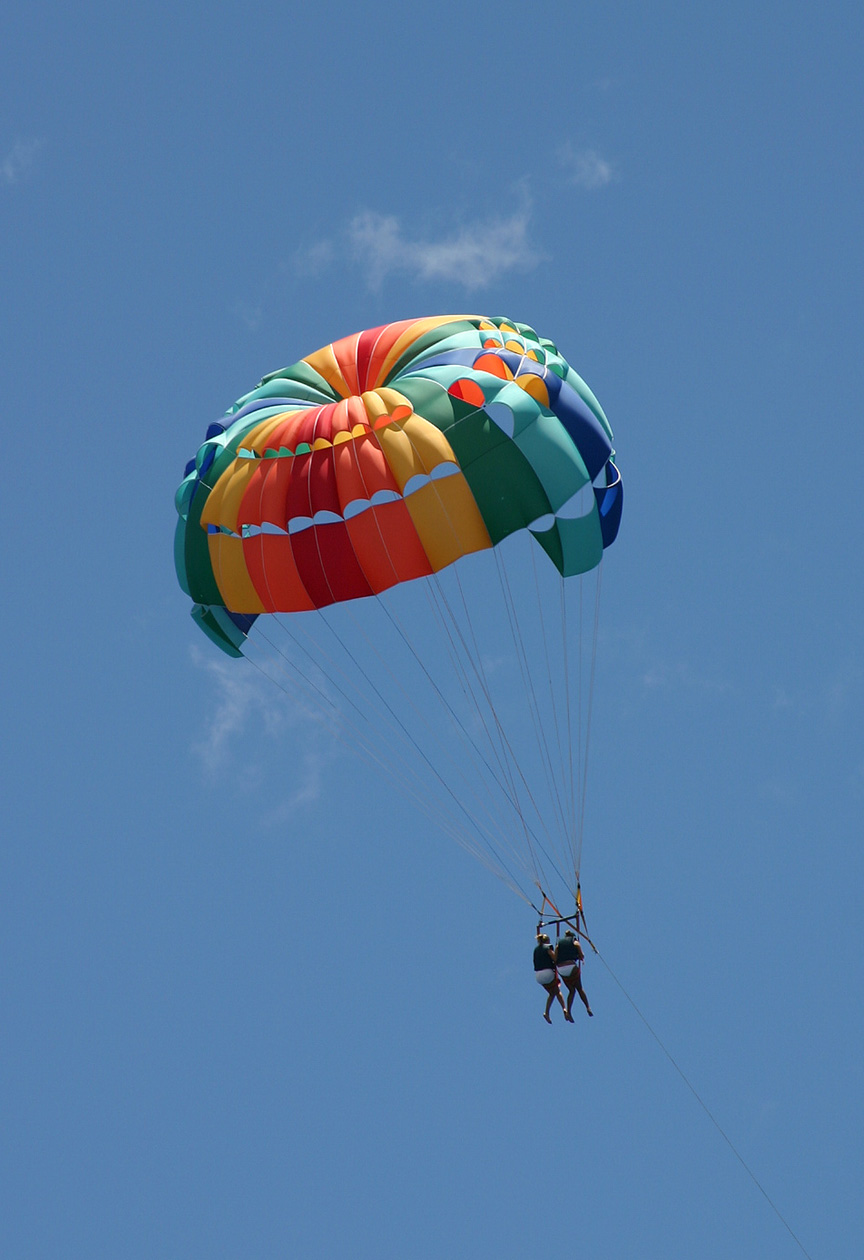
Note asymmetrical flutes of highly modified parachute so kiting occurs.

Parasail
Parachutes modified to have a positive lift/drag ratio, so the wing can be kited to carry humans or other payload
Paravane
Water kite
Patent kites
Kites that have been represented in ornamental design patents throughout history are sometimes built to demonstrate kite history. Also, mechanical kite patents hold claims that form the focus of some kite builders' project focus. Sellers enjoy some protection when a sold kite is a patent kite. One of the most noteworthy of the patent kites is that of George Pocock.
Pentagonal kites
also known as penta- or five-sided polygonal kite. The five points give ample opportunity for a head, two hands and two legs. Distinguish pentagonal kites from five-point star kites that are ten-sided (unless art is simply showing the five-point star). Five recalls the shapes of humans and animals.
Picnic plate kites
See Plate kites, below.
Plasma kites
Distinguish ambient flying media: blood plasma, space plasma or confined scientific-laboratory or industrial plasma streams. Plasma is the most common phase of matter in the universe.
Plate kites
paper, plastic or EPS foam picnic-plate kites. This type of kite includes figure, artistic, dragon, and rotary kites. The most simple kite is the single plate, uncut and left as a circular kite; complexity is up to its maker.
Powered-harness hang glider kites

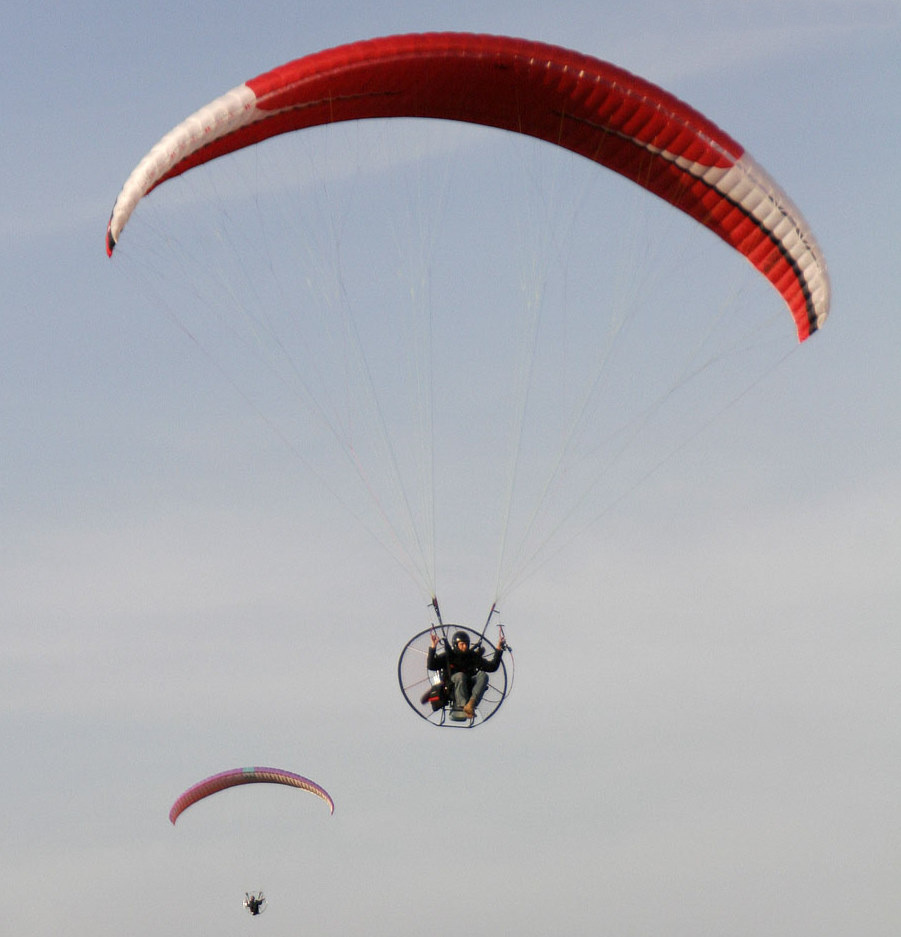
Kite anchored to moving power-kite operator

Engine on or off, kite still flies

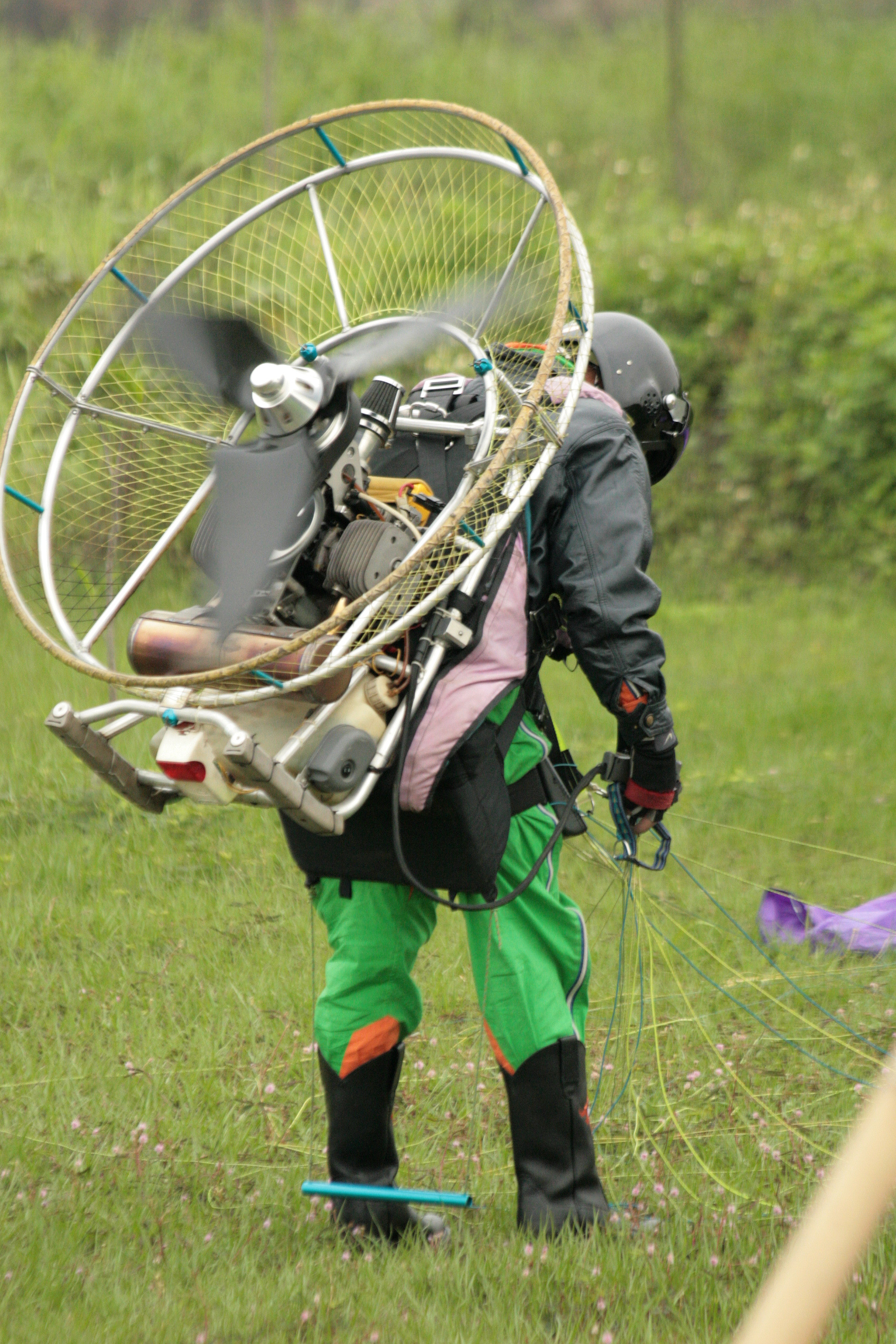
Note that it is pilot who is thrust and tugs the kite lines.

Powered paragliders
(Powered paragliding)

=== Q ===
Quantum kites
Quick or Fast kites
Quick kites are kites that can be made quickly; simplicity may or may not be characteristic of a quick kite. Commonly available materials are used by quick-kite designers. Specially ordered materials are not used, and few (if any) tools are needed.

=== R ===
Race kites
Kites specially designed for high-speed traction racing (on land, water, ice, snow).

Radio-controlled kite
unpowered Both for sport and commercial purposes, the complexity of more than one line emphasizes control of power, position and attack angle. One line simplifies reeling and line control. A project in the power-kite sport field is the Slarc. Radio-control de-powering and release systems are being developed. Instead of the drag of two, three, four, or five lines, the single-line radio-controlled kite has the drag of just one line.
Radio-controlled kite
powered scale and manned Distinguish a product that is not a kite (called RC Kite) from true kites that have radio controls on a kite-lined kite wing.
Ram-air kites
Sled kites with ram-air cavities and Jalbert parafoil power kites are ram-air kites. The wind rams into the cavities and inflates sections of a kite to give the kite shape and sturdiness.
Recycled kites
Kites made from recycled goods
Revolution kite or Rev kites
(four-line revolution stunt kites by Joe Hadzicki)
Ribbon kites
<Several kinds: large non-rotating ribbon arch kite (windbow), rotating ribbon kite, and kite with main sails made up of grids and meshes of ribbons (latticework kites). German kite designer Willi Koch specialized in mesh or ribbon-set kites.
Rigid kites
(no flexible sail part)
Rogallo Corner kites
First intended use: radar reflector for rescue
Rogallo Parawing kite
Roller kite
Rolloplan kites
(German origin)

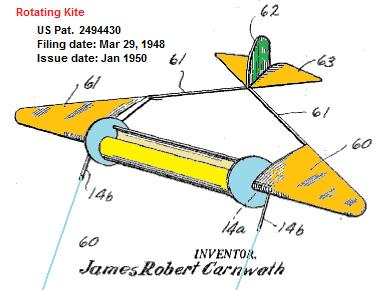
Rotating kite

Rokkaku (bowed hexagonal) kite

Rotary kites
Vertical axis rotary, spanwise rotary, mixed rotary, streamwise axially rotary. EPS, Styrofoam, and balsa special Magnus-effect rotary kites can be made with several construction methods for two-line control kites for heavier breezes. Many spanwise rotary kites are two-line control kites. However, UFO-SAM is a single-line rotary Magnus-effect kite; one of the leading makers of the kite has died, but a manufacturer has continued offering the kite. A two-line rotary kite using a special control bar is instructed in the patent by J. R. Carnwath filed on 29 March 1948. Kites that revolve but do not obtain lift from the revolving motion are distinct from Magnus-effect lifters or gyrocopting lifting rotating kites; Thomas Ansboro of Scotland, in 1891, instructed in a US patent 464412 about a revolving hexagonal kite where the bridling is critical.

A ringed UFO rotary kite patent indicated a special bridling ring and a central rotating ring (US Patent 4779825). The very high aspect ratio rotating spanwise ribbon kites (Skybows) are continuing to gain interest; these require at least two swivels. Also, a variety of rotary kites that are nearly streamers rotate almost windward; some are vaned and some are not. In 1995 Carl E. Knight and Jo Ann F. Knight instructed a rotary kite that rotates near windward for its axis (not like autogyro or spanwise magnus).

Rokkaku or Rokaku kites
Rotating Ribbon kites
One version is called Skybow. The long ribbon is at least a two-anchored system with at least two swivels, but may be segmented to allow segments of ribbon to rotate at different speeds. Autorotation, giving lift via the Magnus effect, allows a rainbow arch kite to fly. A human operator at one end, with a fixed ground anchor at the other, is one example; a separate human operator at each of two anchors is another. More than two tethers can be used.

=== S ===
Sauls' Barrage kites

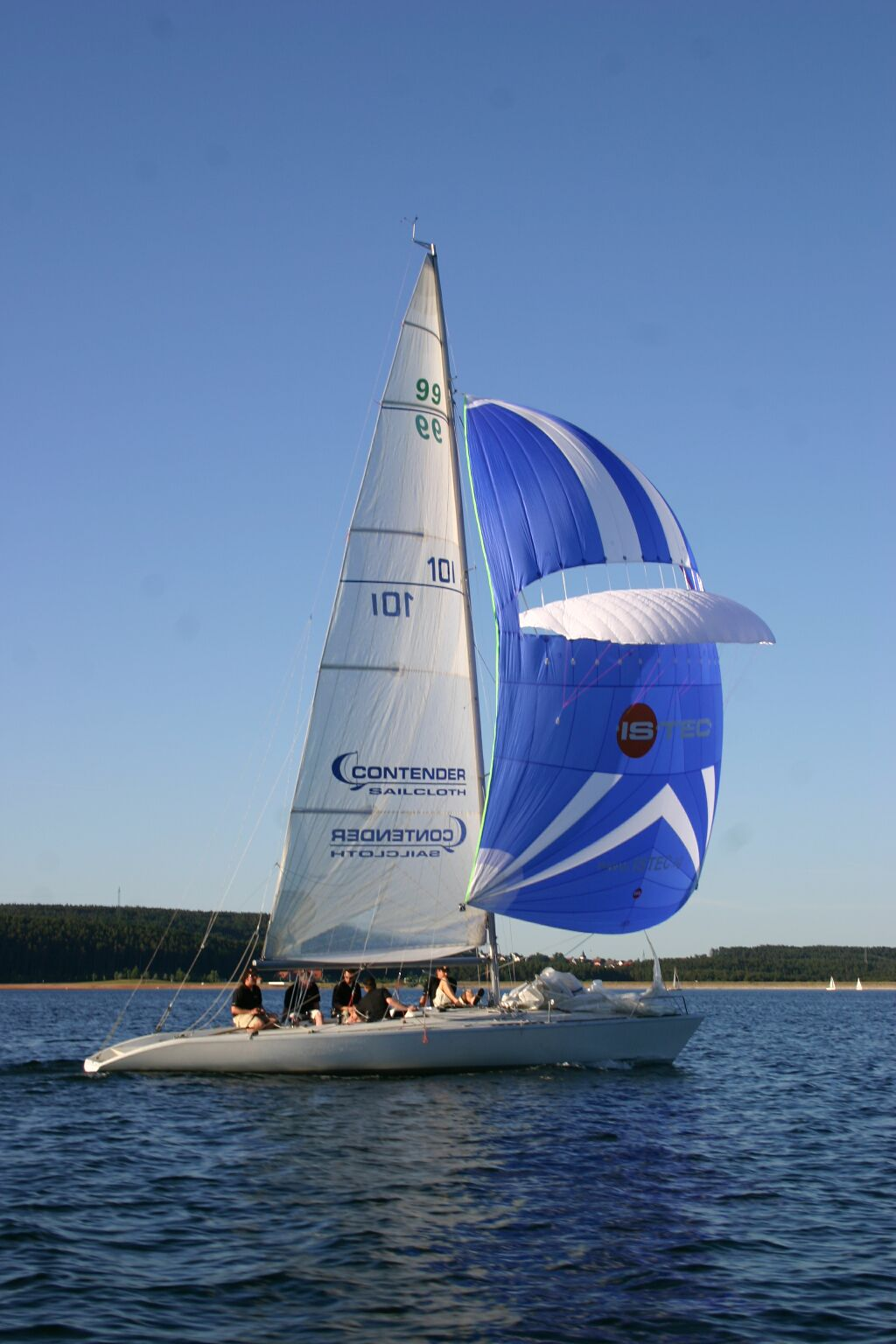
Parasail or sail kite (very short kite lines)

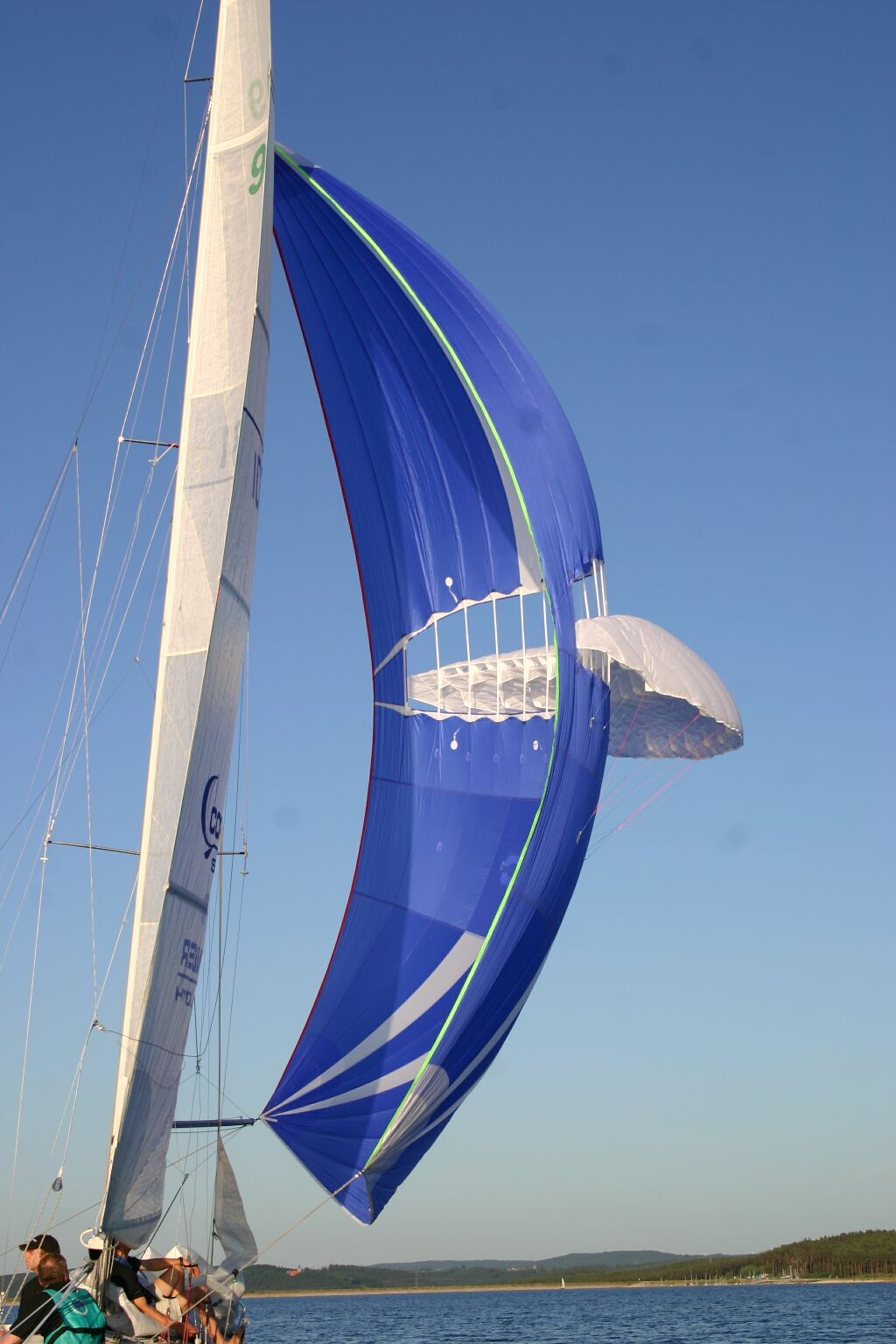
This kite sail has a novel structure.

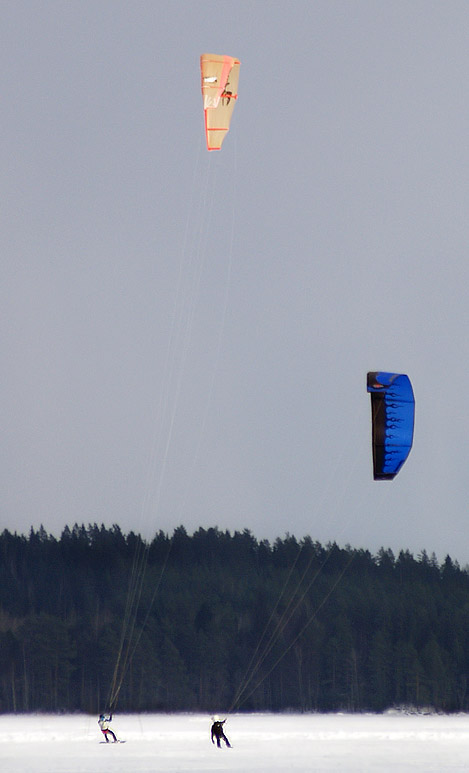
Sailing over snow with a sail or power kite

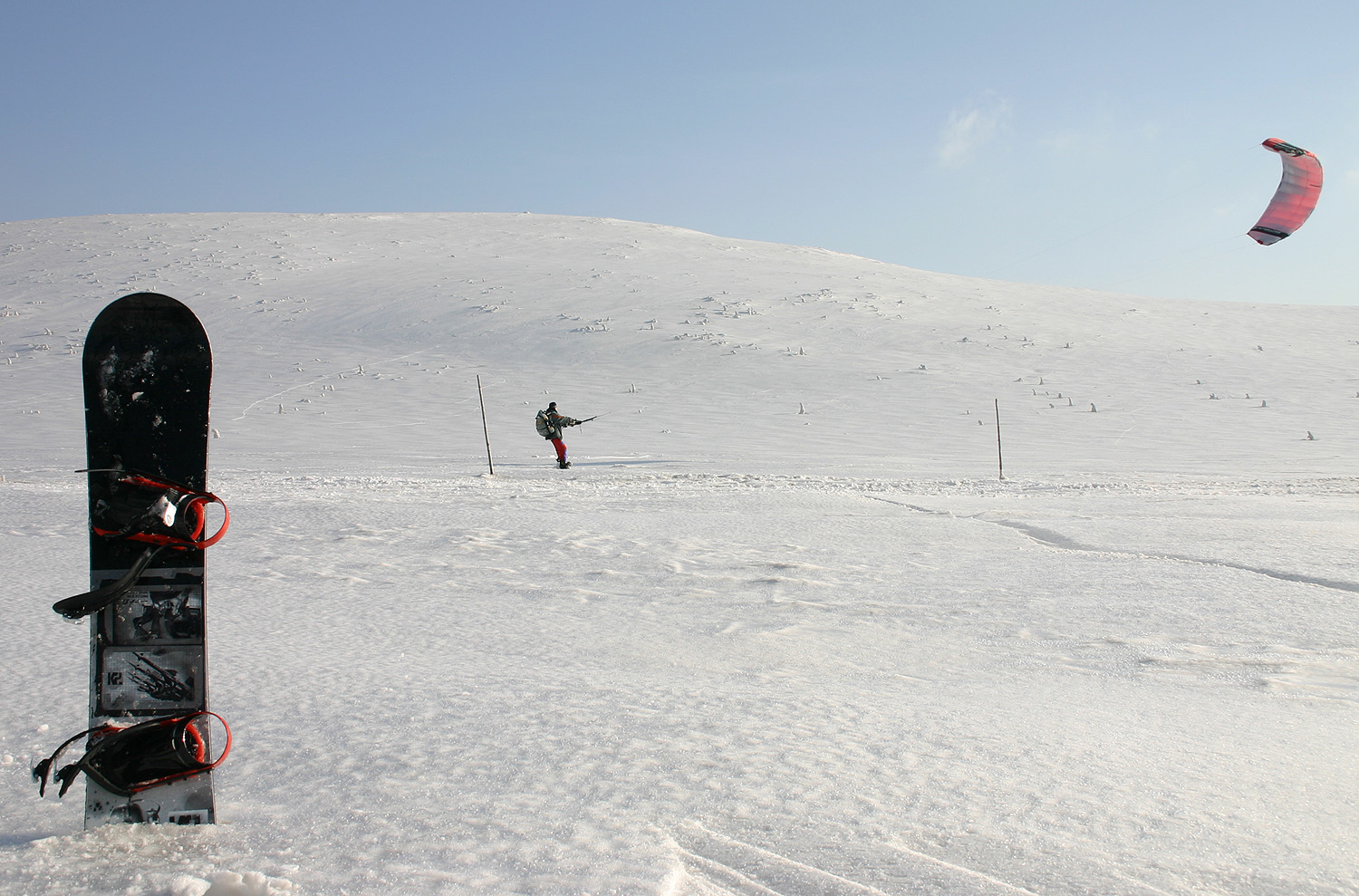
Sailing over snow

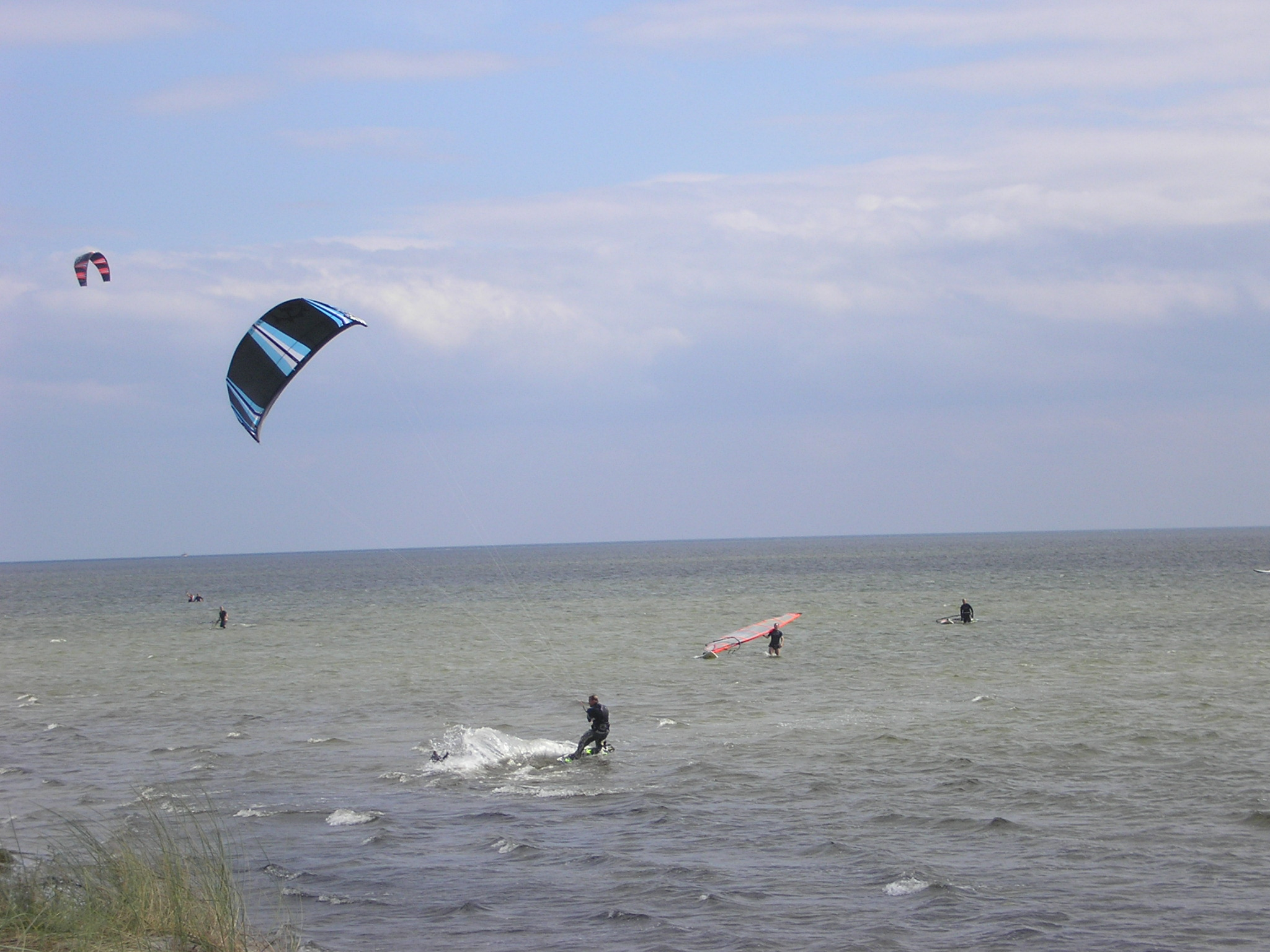
Sailing a waterboard (kitesurfing)

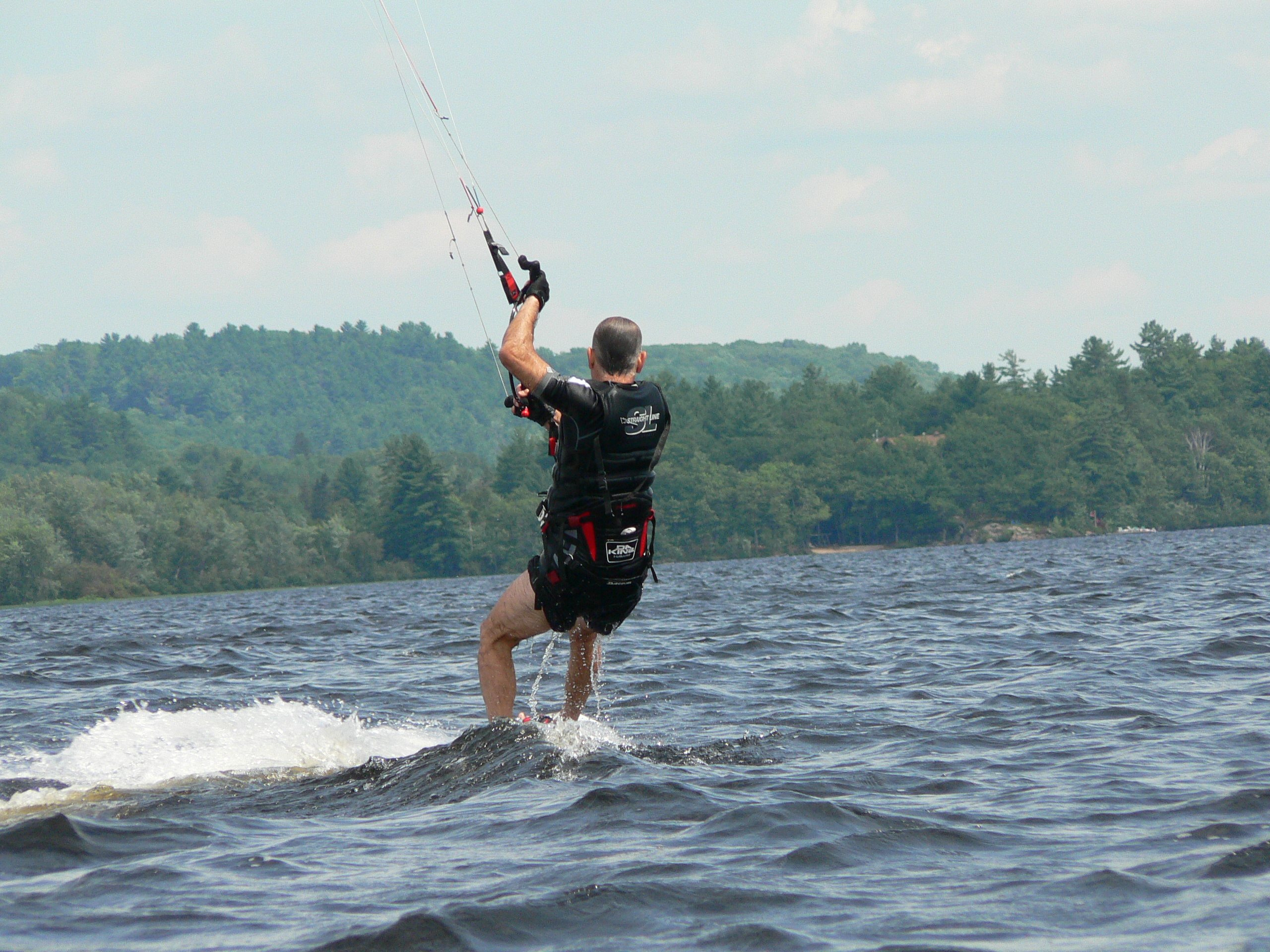
Kiteboarding (sail kite for sailing a board)

Sail kites
Sails that are fully tethered and give a net positive lift are sail kites. Sailing vessels on water and land use sail kites. The kiting tethers can be short or long. Power kites are frequently sail kites as a power kite is used to sail a skier, landsailing buggy, wakeboarder, ground wheeled vehicle, boats and so on.

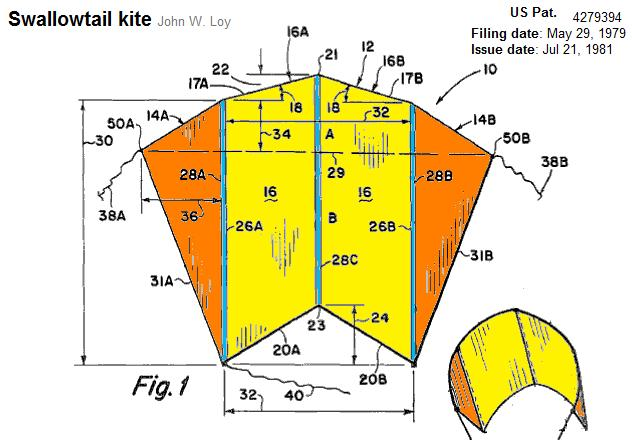
John W. Loy teaches sled-kite variation which may avoid collapse frequent with sled kites (swallowtail sled).

Self-erecting collapsible kites
Collapsible kites that self-erect upon a triggering event to full kite form have special niche uses and appeal. Positive-inflated kytoons would be typed here, if a triggering erected the kytoon. Already-erected kites like the parafoil are self-inflating, but not usually considered as needing erecting (since they are already softly finished in form, except for placing them in the wind).
Show kites
See "Display kites". Show kites are one category of display kite.
Skating kites
See Kite skating
Sled kites
include the Buda Jewish Kite of 1904, the Scott and Allison Sleds and many variations.
Signature kites
Kites made by a particular person become prized possessions for some people.
Single-piece kites
Sode or Sode Dako kites
This type wins attention with its shape, especially in Japan.
Soft kites
Parawing, parafoil, some un-sticked sleds, Barish sailwing, Playsail, KiteShip, foils
Solar kites
in plasma or photonic media; Solar-kite engineers and scientists are expanding the definition of a kite. The sail may be full of solar-energy electricity-generating material. Another example is the Solar Max Delta Kite.
Soil kites
Sound-making kites
Square kites
Stacked kites
Stacking sub-kite units
Stunt kites
Styrofoam kites
When Styrofoam dining plates are used in a dragon-kite segment, when a kite is made from styrene drinking cups, or when kites are made with the dominant material styrofoam or EPS foam, then the kite world refers to the kite type as a styrofoam kite. This allows use of recycled materials.

=== T ===
Corner reflector, part of Rogallo's target kite

Target kites
As designed by Paul Garber, a key gunnery practice target in war. Francis Melvin Rogallo, inventor of a fully flexible kite in 1948, also filed a patent on 23 January 1963 for a target kite that used stiffenings, which was also a corner reflector.
Tetrahedral kites
Inventor Alexander Graham Bell focused on these types of kites; This kite type was a dominant interest of Mr. Bell's.
Thai kites

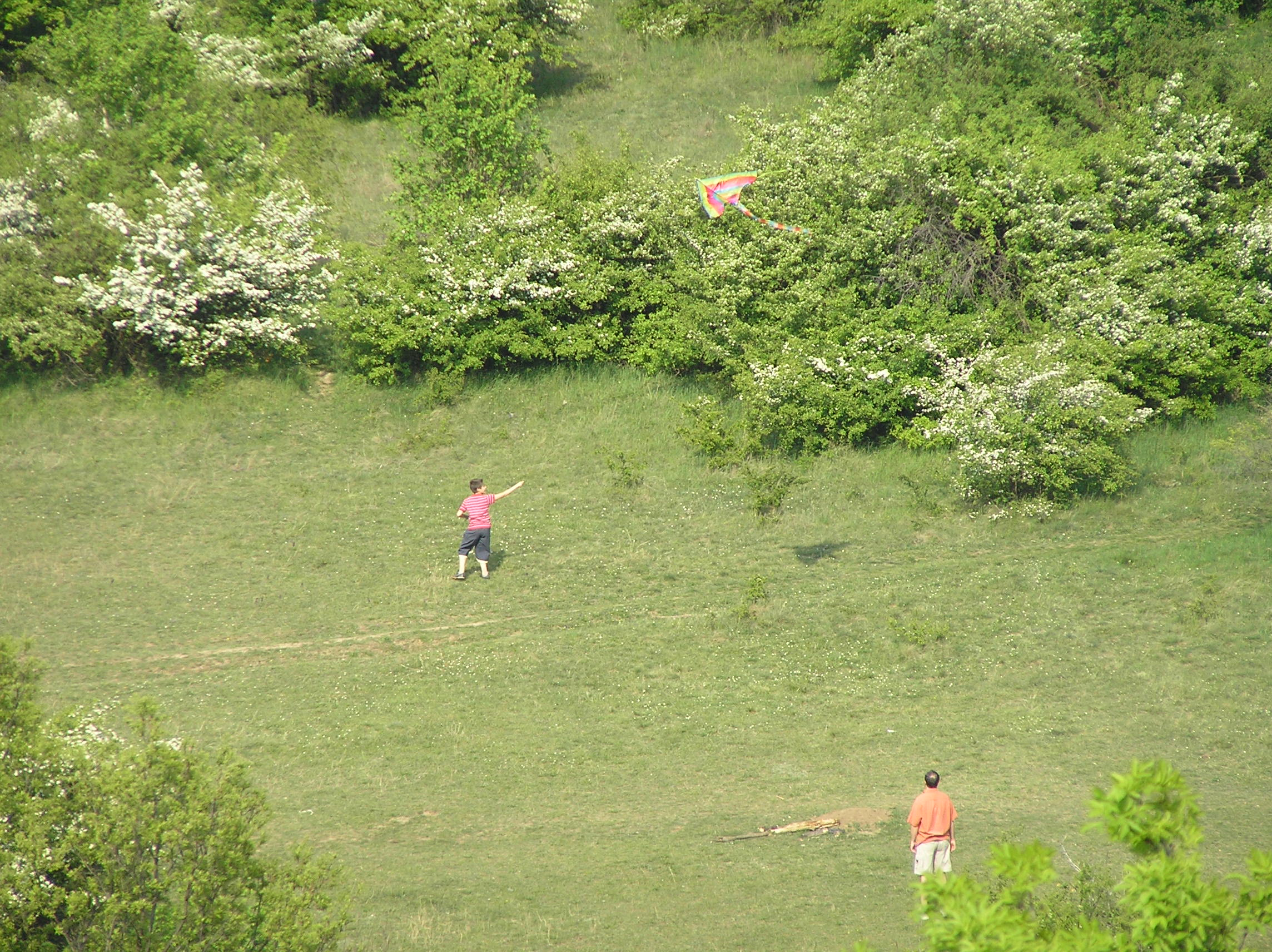
Toy kiting

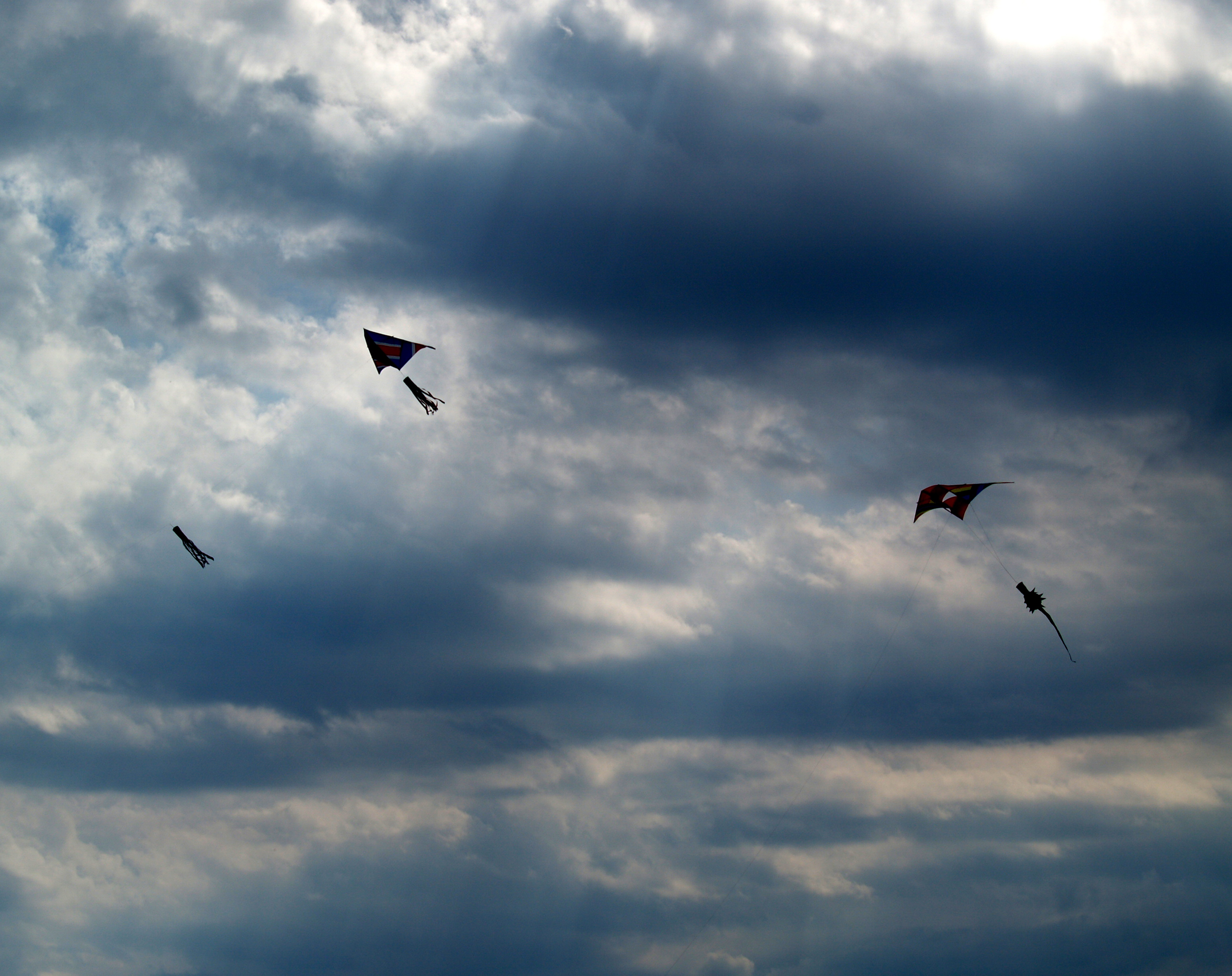
Single-line toy kites

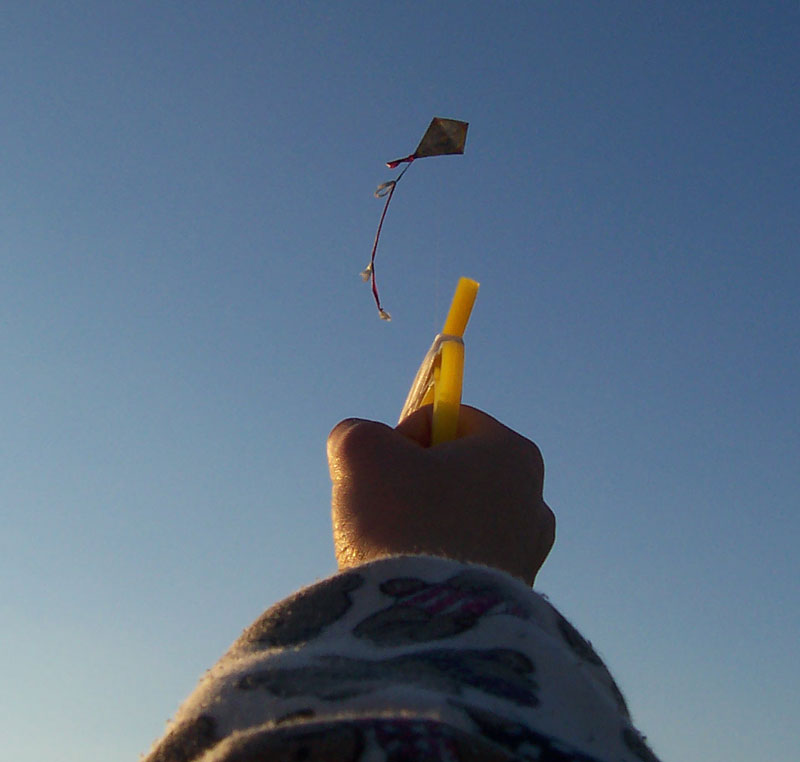
Eddy, Cross, Malay or Diamond toy kite with tail

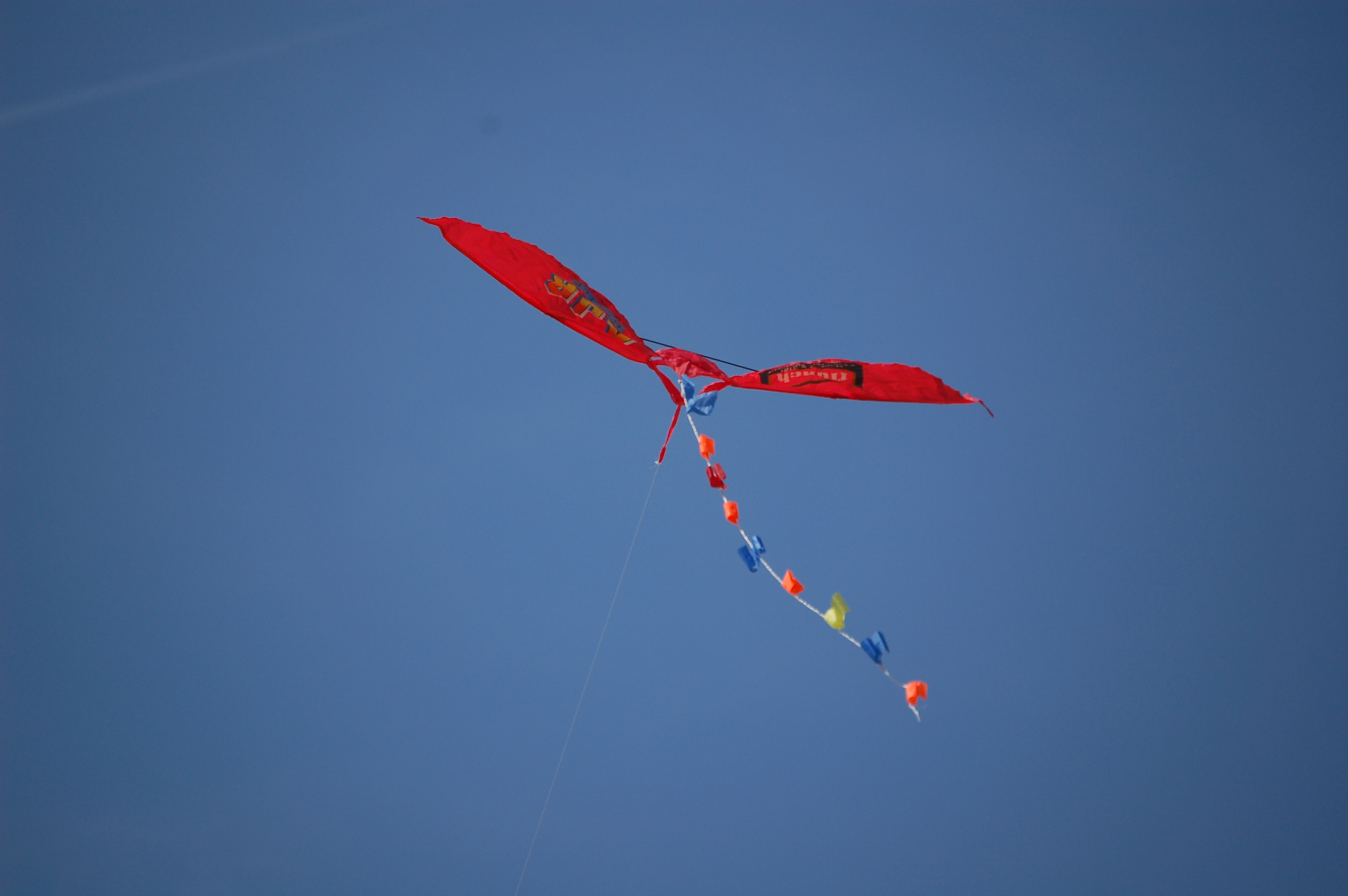
Color and tail toy kite

Toy kites
Traction kites
for relaunching from water, differ from dedicated land traction kites
Train or Kite train
Connect many kite-body units onto one line in various ways and have a kite that is a kite train, or train of kites. Dragon kites, centipede kites, and some arches are trains. A train of mini kites is a mini-kite train.
Trainer kites
Kites of lower power that are used to practice maneuvers before higher-powered kites are used.
Tukkal or Tukal kites
Special four-stick kite

=== U ===
Underwater kite
Water kites have an analogous presence in other liquids as the flying media; kite expert David Culp published about non-water media for kiting within those fluids rather than air (see "Water kites" below). An early presentation of an underwater box kite was repeated in the Drachen Foundation Kite Journal from a 1909 Scientific American article.

=== V ===
Ventilated kites
Flying kites in high or stormy winds is achieved in several ways; one way is to have high-porosity or ventilated kites Effective sail area is reduced, while shape and appearance can follow known kite shapes of non-ventilated kites.
Victory kites
One series of noted kites: the Victory kites of Stormy Weathers (yes that is his name) include Star Victory, Swift Victory, and Winged Victory. Mr. Weathers was respected for building kites from common materials.

=== W ===
Waffle kites
such as those made by Joseph LeCornu
Water kites
This mechanism handles a water kite or underwater inverted kite; also spelled paravane, paravanes. Underwater kiting of heavier-than-water (even ballasted) instruments serve industry and science. Domina Jalbert told Tal Streeter that water kites are hardly different from air kites and could have many applications.
Water relaunchable kites
Air kites that can be launched and relaunched once the kite's wing and lines are settled on or in the water.
Woglum kites
(variant of the Malay kite). Gilbert T. Woglum in 1896 flew a train of kites over a parade and hung a golden flag from the main line.
Work kites
or working kites: are kites designed to perform specialized tasks or produce work or energy. George Pocock put kites to work pulling vessels. Kiteboarding puts kites to work. Especially in crosswind kite power there are work kites able to gain high energy from apparent winds created by flying the wings to crosswind.

=== X ===
X-treme kites
Extreme sport kites.
X flat two-stick kites
the frame is "X" format with two spars; rectangular or square or cut to form X. Flat kites made of two sticks. Artistic alphabet character "X" kite.

=== Y ===
Yacht kites
Leslie Hunt's book, 25 Kites, includes a yacht-kite plan.
Youth kites
Kites for the very young. Also beginner kites, kid kites, kiddie kites. Kites suitable for the very young are almost always small single-line kites using cotton kite line. Festivals sometimes have a category called "youth kites".

=== Z ===
Zero-wind kites
Kite pilot stays within a tight ground circle, or pumps the kite line without moving, or walks or runs when there are zero-wind conditions (also known as nil-wind, null-wind, no-wind, indoor kites). The Ninja zero- and low-wind kite plan is open for all for non-commercial use.

== See also ==
- Ballooning (spider) (mechanical kiting by spiderlings)
- Controlled aerodynamic instability phenomena
- Domina Jalbert
- Francis Rogallo
- Kite applications
- Kite control systems
- Kite mooring
- Kite rig
- List of surface water sports
- Paravane (water kite)
- Paravane (weapon)
- Spider silk
