= Kite =

Tethered aircraft

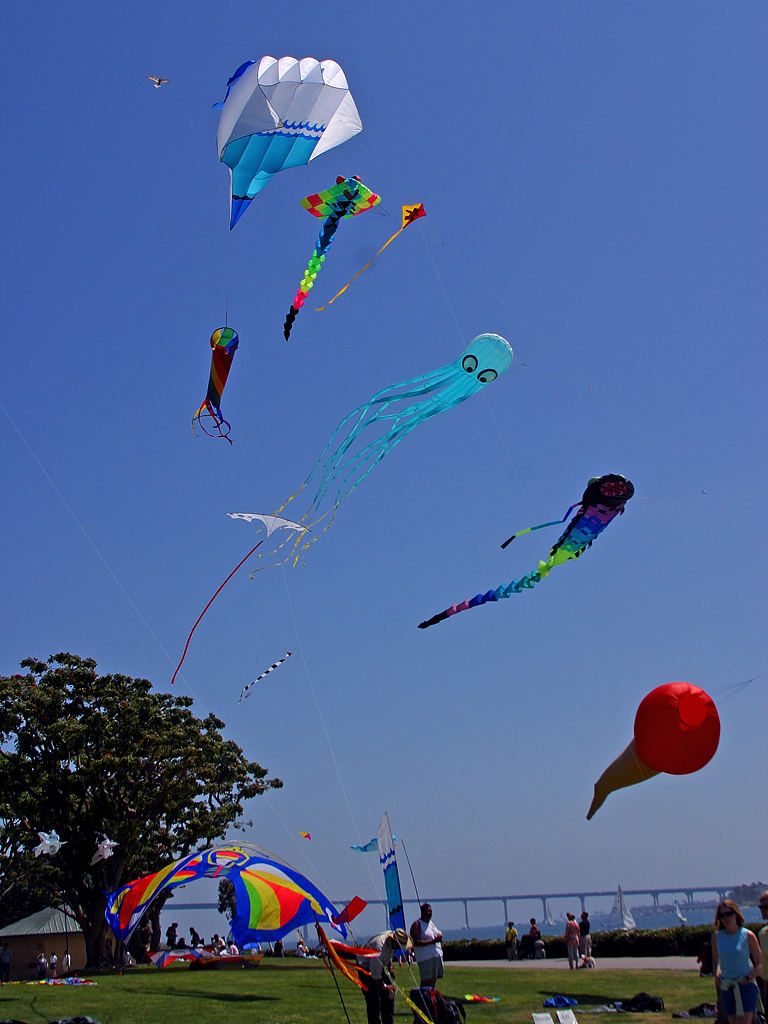
Various kites being flown

A kite is a tethered heavier-than-air craft with wing surfaces that react against the air to create lift and drag forces. A kite consists of wings, tethers and anchors. Kites often have a bridle and tail to guide the face of the kite so the wind can lift it. Some kite designs do not need a bridle; box kites can have a single attachment point. A kite may have fixed or moving anchors that can balance the kite. The name is derived from the kite, the hovering bird of prey. There are several kite shapes, including the popular delta kite and diamond kite.

The lift that sustains the kite in flight is generated when air moves around the kite's surface, producing low pressure above and high pressure below the wings. The interaction with the wind also generates horizontal drag along the direction of the wind. The resultant force vector from the lift and drag force components is opposed by the tension of one or more of the lines or tethers to which the kite is attached. The anchor point of the kite line may be static or moving (e.g., the towing of a kite by a running person, boat, free-falling anchors as in paragliders and fugitive parakites or vehicle).

The same principles of fluid flow apply in liquids, so kites can be used in underwater currents. Paravanes and otter boards operate underwater on an analogous principle. Man-lifting kites were made for reconnaissance, entertainment and during development of the first practical aircraft, the biplane. Kites have a long and varied history and many different types are flown individually and at festivals worldwide. Kites may be flown for recreation, art or other practical uses. Sport kites can be flown in aerial ballet, sometimes as part of a competition. Power kites are multi-line steerable kites designed to generate large forces which can be used to power activities such as kite surfing, kite landboarding, kite buggying and snow kiting.

== History ==
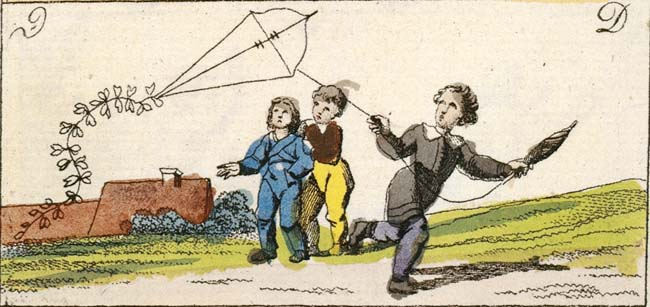
Boys flying a kite. Engraving published in Germany in 1828 by Johann Michael Voltz

In China, the kite has been claimed as the invention of the 5th-century BC Chinese philosophers Mozi and Lu Ban, who flew wooden kites called muyuan (木鸢). With the invention of paper in the Han dynasty, kites made of paper became popular, and kites were called zhiyuan (纸鸢). Materials ideal for kite building were readily available, including silk fabric for sail material; fine, high-tensile-strength silk for flying line; and resilient bamboo for a strong, lightweight framework. By 549 AD, a kite was used as a message for a rescue mission. Ancient Chinese texts describe kites being used for measuring distances, testing the wind, lifting men, signaling, and communication for military operations. The earliest known Chinese kites were flat (not bowed) and often rectangular. Later, tailless kites incorporated a stabilizing bowline. Kites were decorated with mythological motifs and legendary figures. By the Tang dynasty, bamboo flutes, whistles, and ribbons were attached to kites to create sound, the precursor to the modern fengzheng (风筝), named after the sound the kites made in the wind.

After its introduction into India, the kite further evolved into the fighter kite, known as the patang in India, where thousands are flown every year on festivals such as Makar Sankranti. Kites were known throughout Polynesia, as far as New Zealand, with the assumption being that the knowledge diffused from China along with the people. Anthropomorphic kites made from cloth and wood were used in religious ceremonies to send prayers to the gods. Polynesian kite traditions are used by anthropologists to get an idea of early "primitive" Asian traditions that are believed to have at one time existed in Asia.

Kites were late to arrive in Europe, although windsock-like banners were known and used by the Romans. Stories of kites were first brought to Europe by Marco Polo towards the end of the 13th century, and kites were brought back by sailors from Japan and Malaysia in the 16th and 17th centuries. Konrad Kyeser described dragon kites in Bellifortis about 1400 AD. Although kites were initially regarded as mere curiosities, by the 18th and 19th centuries they were being used as vehicles for scientific research. In 1752, Benjamin Franklin published an account of a kite experiment to prove that lightning was caused by electricity. Kites were also instrumental in the research of the Wright brothers, and others, as they developed the first airplane in the late 1800s. Several different designs of man-lifting kites were developed. The period from 1860 to about 1910 became the European "golden age of kiting".

The 20th century saw the development of many new kite designs. These included Eddy's tailless diamond, the tetrahedral kite, the Rogallo wing, the sled kite, the parafoil, and power kites. Kites were used for scientific purposes, especially in meteorology, aeronautics, wireless communications and photography. The Rogallo wing was adapted for stunt kites and hang gliding and the parafoil was adapted for parachuting and paragliding. The rapid development of mechanically powered aircraft diminished interest in kites. World War II saw a limited use of kites for military purposes (survival radio, Focke Achgelis Fa 330, military radio antenna kites). Kites are now mostly used for recreation. Lightweight synthetic materials (ripstop nylon, plastic film, carbon fiber tube and rod) are used for kite making. Synthetic rope and cord (nylon, polyethylene, kevlar and dyneema) are used as bridle and kite line.

== Materials ==
Designs often emulate flying insects, birds, and other beasts, both real and mythical. The finest Chinese kites are made from split bamboo (usually golden bamboo), covered with silk, and hand painted. On larger kites, clever hinges and latches allow the kite to be disassembled and compactly folded for storage or transport. Cheaper mass-produced kites are often made from printed polyester rather than silk.

Tails are used for some single-line kite designs to keep the kite's nose pointing into the wind. Spinners and spinsocks can be attached to the flying line for visual effect. There are rotating wind socks which spin like a turbine. On large display kites these tails, spinners and spinsocks can be 50 feet (15 m) long or more.

Modern aerobatic kites use two or four lines to allow fine control of the kite's angle to the wind. Traction kites may have an additional line to de-power the kite and quick-release mechanisms to disengage flyer and kite in an emergency.

== Practical uses ==
Kites have been used for human flight, military applications, science and meteorology, photography, lifting radio antennas, generating power, aerodynamics experiments, and much more.

=== Military applications ===
Kites have been used for military purposes in the past, such as signaling, delivery of ammunition, and for observation, both by lifting an observer above the field of battle and by using kite aerial photography.

Kites were first used in warfare by the Chinese. During the Song dynasty the Fire Crow, a kite carrying incendiary powder, a fuse, and a burning stick of incense was developed as a weapon.

According to Samguk Sagi, in 647 Kim Yu-sin, a Korean general of Silla, rallied his troops to defeat rebels by using flaming kites which also frightened the enemy.

Russian chronicles mention Prince Oleg of Novgorod use of kites during the siege of Constantinople in 906: "and he crafted horses and men of paper, armed and gilded, and lifted them into the air over the city; the Greeks saw them and feared them".

Walter de Milemete's 1326 De nobilitatibus, sapientiis, et prudentiis regum treatise depicts a group of knights flying kite laden with a black-powder filled firebomb over the wall of city.

Kites were also used by Admiral Yi of the Joseon dynasty (1392–1910) of Korea. During the Japanese invasions of Korea (1592–1598), Admiral Yi commanded his navy using kites. His kites had specific markings directing his fleet to perform various orders.

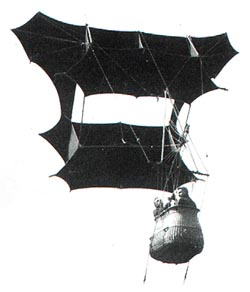
One of Cody's "manlifter" kites in 1908

In the modern era the British Army used kites to haul human lookouts into the air for observation purposes, using the kites developed by Samuel Franklin Cody. Barrage kites were used to protect shipping during the Second World War. Kites were also used for anti-aircraft target practice. Kites and kytoons were used for lofting communications antenna. Submarines lofted observers in rotary kites.

Palestinians from the Gaza Strip have flown firebomb kites over the Israel–Gaza barrier, setting fires on the Israeli side of the border. Hundreds of dunams of Israeli crop fields were burned by firebomb kites launched from Gaza, with an estimated economic loss of several millions of shekels.

=== Science and meteorology ===
Kites have been used for scientific purposes, such as Benjamin Franklin's famous experiment proving that lightning is electricity. Kites were the precursors to the traditional aircraft, and were instrumental in the development of early flying craft. Alexander Graham Bell experimented with very large man-lifting kites, as did the Wright brothers and Lawrence Hargrave. Kites had a historical role in lifting scientific instruments to measure atmospheric conditions for weather forecasting. Francis Ronalds and William Radcliffe Birt described a very stable kite at Kew Observatory as early as 1847 that was trialled for the purpose of supporting self-registering meteorological instruments at height.

=== Radio aerials and light beacons ===
Kites can be used for radio purposes, by kites carrying antennas for MF, LF or VLF-transmitters. This method was used for the reception station of the first transatlantic transmission by Marconi. Captive balloons may be more convenient for such experiments, because kite-carried antennas require a lot of wind, which may be not always possible with heavy equipment and a ground conductor. It must be taken into account during experiments, that a conductor carried by a kite can lead to high voltage toward ground, which can endanger people and equipment, if suitable precautions (grounding through resistors or a parallel resonant circuit tuned to transmission frequency) are not taken.

Kites can be used to carry light effects such as lightsticks or battery powered lights.

=== Kite traction ===
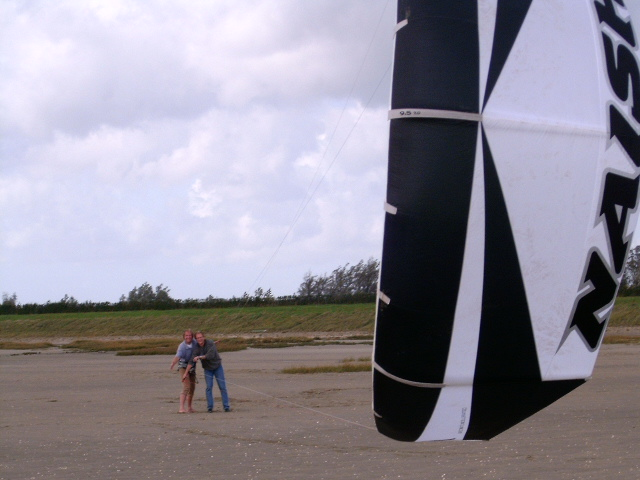
A quad-line traction kite, commonly used as a power source for kite surfing

Kites can be used to pull people and vehicles downwind. Efficient foil-type kites such as power kites can also be used to sail upwind under the same principles as used by other sailing craft, provided that lateral forces on the ground or in the water are redirected as with the keels, center boards, wheels and ice blades of traditional sailing craft. In the last two decades several kite sailing sports have become popular, such as kite buggying, kite land boarding, kite boating and kite surfing. Snow kiting has also become popular in recent years.

Kite sailing opens several possibilities not available in traditional sailing:

- Wind speeds are greater at higher altitudes
- Kites may be maneuvered dynamically which increases the force available dramatically
- There is no need for mechanical structures to withstand bending forces; vehicles or hulls can be very light or dispensed with all together

=== Electricity generation ===
Computer-controlled kites can serve as a method of electricity generation when windmills are impractical. Several companies have introduced self-contained crates and shipping containers that provide an alternative to gas-powered generators for remote locations. Such systems use a combination of autonomous, self-launching kites for generation and batteries to store excess power for when winds are low or when otherwise draw exceeds supply. Some designs are tethered to long lines to reach high altitude winds which are always present, even when ground level winds are unavailable or insufficient.

=== Underwater kites ===
Underwater kites are now being developed to harvest renewable power from the flow of water.

- A kite was used in minesweeping operations from the First World War: this was a foil "attached to a sweep-wire submerging it to the requisite depth when it is towed over a minefield" (OED, 2021). See also paravane.

== Cultural uses ==
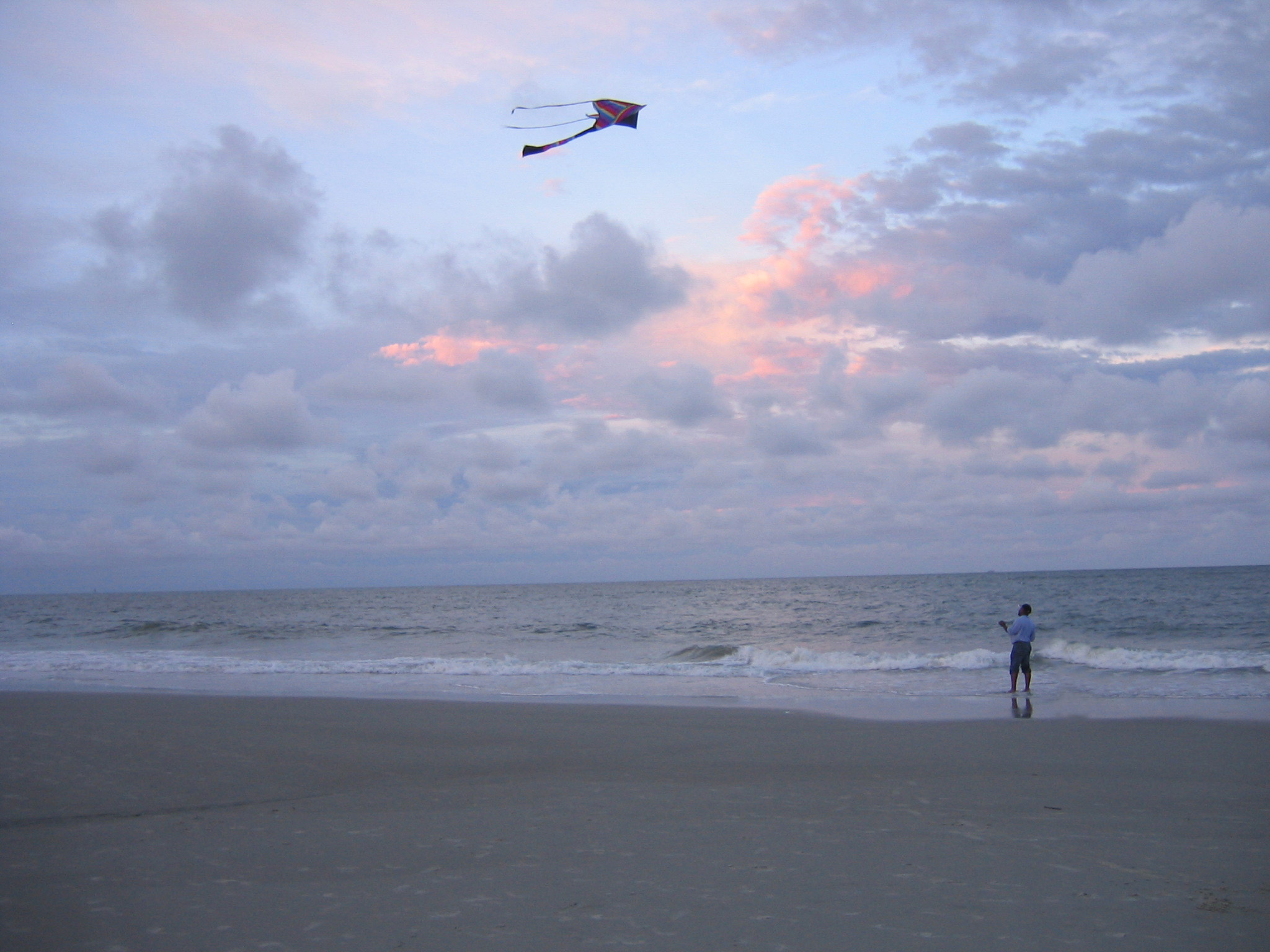
A man flying a kite on the beach, a good location for flying as winds travelling across the sea contain few up or down draughts which cause kites to fly erratically

Kite festivals are a popular form of entertainment throughout the world. They include large local events, traditional festivals which have been held for hundreds of years and major international festivals which bring in kite flyers from other countries to display their unique art kites and demonstrate the latest technical kites.

Many countries have kite museums. These museums may have a focus on historical kites, preserving the country's kite traditions.

=== Asia ===
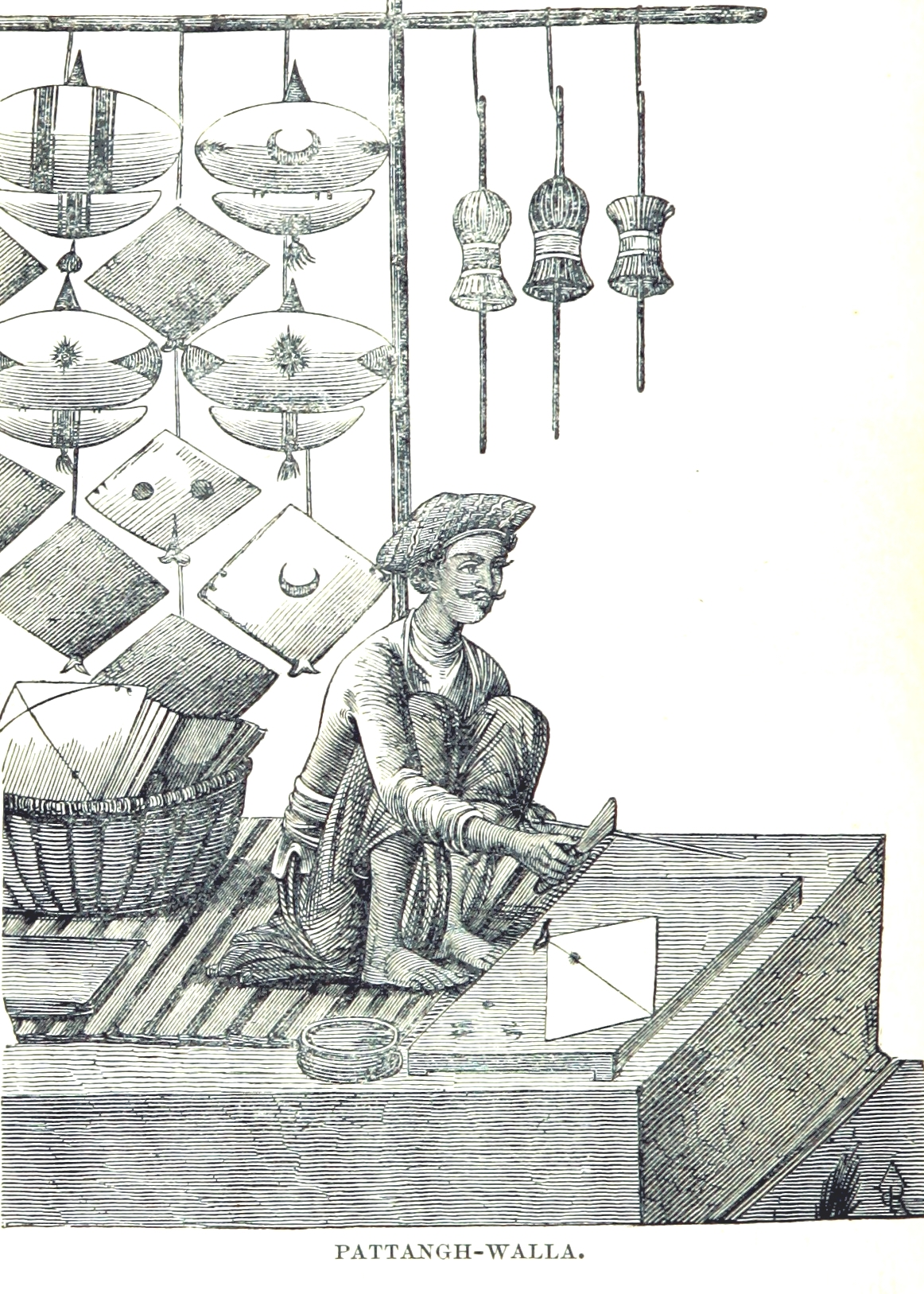
Kite maker from India, image from Travels in India, including Sinde and the Punjab by H. E. Lloyd, 1845

Kite flying is popular in many Asian countries, where it often takes the form of "kite fighting", in which participants try to snag each other's kites or cut other kites down. Fighter kites are usually small, flattened diamond-shaped kites made of paper and bamboo. Tails are not used on fighter kites so that agility and maneuverability are not compromised.

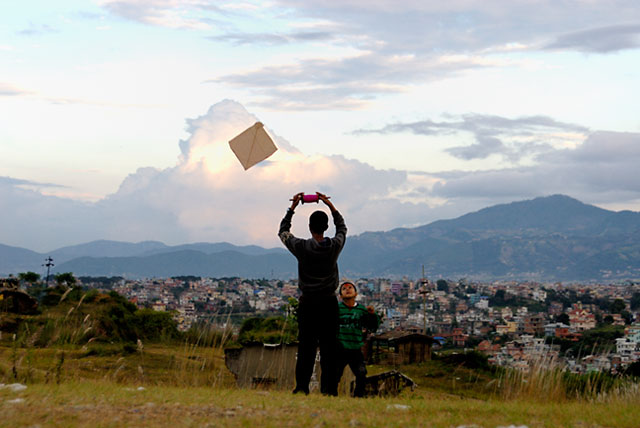
Boy flying kite in outskirts of Kathmandu Valley

In Afghanistan, kite flying is a popular game, and is known in Dari as Gudiparan Bazi. Some kite fighters pass their strings through a mixture of ground glass powder and glue, which is legal. The resulting strings are very abrasive and can sever the competitor's strings more easily. The abrasive strings can also injure people. Currently after Taliban rule in Afghanistan, kite flying is banned, among various other recreations.

Kites are very popular in India, with the states of Gujarat, Bihar, Uttar Pradesh, Rajasthan, Haryana and Punjab notable for their kite fighting festivals. Highly maneuverable single-string paper and bamboo kites are flown from the rooftops while using line friction in an attempt to cut each other's kite lines, either by letting the cutting line loose at high speed or by pulling the line in a fast and repeated manner. During the Indian spring festival of Makar Sankranti, near the middle of January, millions of people fly kites all over northern India. Kite flying in Hyderabad starts a month before this, but kite flying/fighting is an important part of other celebrations, including Republic Day, Independence Day, Raksha Bandhan, Viswakarma Puja day in late September and Janmashtami. An international kite festival is held every year before Uttarayan for three days in Vadodara, Surat and Ahmedabad.

In Indonesia kites are flown as both sport and recreation. One of the most popular kite variants is from Bali. Balinese kites are unique and they have different designs and forms; birds, butterflies, dragons, ships, etc. In Vietnam, kites are flown without tails. Instead small flutes are attached allowing the wind to "hum" a musical tune. There are other forms of sound-making kites. In Bali, large bows are attached to the front of the kites to make a deep throbbing vibration, and in Malaysia, a row of gourds with sound-slots are used to create a whistle as the kite flies. Malaysia is also home to the Kite Museum in Malacca.

In Japan, kite flying is traditionally a children's play in New Year holidays and in the Boys' Festival in May. In some areas, there is a tradition to celebrate a new boy baby with a new kite (祝い凧). There are many kite festivals throughout Japan. The most famous one is "Yōkaichi Giant Kite Festival" in Higashiōmi, Shiga, which started in 1841. The largest kite ever built in the festival is 62 feet (19 m) wide by 67 feet (20 m) high and weighs 3,307 pounds (1,500 kg). In the Hamamatsu Kite Festival in Hamamatsu, Shizuoka, more than 100 kites are flown in the sky over the Nakatajima Sand Dunes, one of the three largest sand dunes in Japan, which overlooks the Enshunada Sea. Parents who have a new baby prepare a new kite with their baby's name and fly it in the festival. These kites are traditional ones made from bamboo and paper.

Kite are also popular in Nepal, especially in hilly areas and among the Pahadi and Newar communities, although people also fly kites in Terai areas. Unlike India, people in Nepal fly kites in August – September period and is more popular in time of Dashain.

In Pakistan, kite flying is often known as Gudi-Bazi or Patang-bazi. Although kite flying is a popular ritual for the celebration of spring festival known as Jashn-e-Baharaan (lit. Spring Festival) or Basant, kites are flown throughout the year. Kite fighting is a very popular pastime all around Pakistan, but mostly in urban centers across the country (especially Lahore). The kite fights are at their highest during the spring celebrations and the fighters enjoy competing with rivals to cut-loose the string of the others kite, popularly known as "Paecha". During the spring festival, kite flying competitions are held across the country and the skies are colored with kites. When a competitor succeeds in cutting another's kite loose, shouts of 'wo kata' ring through the air. Cut kites are reclaimed by chasing after them. This is a popular ritual, especially among the country's youth, and is depicted in the 2007 film The Kite Runner (although that story is based in neighboring Afghanistan). Kites and strings are a big business in the country and several different types of string are used, including glass-coated, metal, and tandi. Kite flying was banned in Punjab, Pakistan due to more than one motorcyclist death caused by glass-coated or metal kite strings. Kup, Patang, Guda, and Nakhlaoo are some of the popular kite brands; they vary in balance, weight and speed.

Kites have been flown in China since ancient times. Weifang is home to the largest kite museum in the world. It also hosts an annual international kite festival on the large salt flats south of the city. There are several kite museums in Japan, UK, Malaysia, Indonesia, Taiwan, Thailand and the US. In the pre-modern period, Malays in Singapore used kites for fishing.

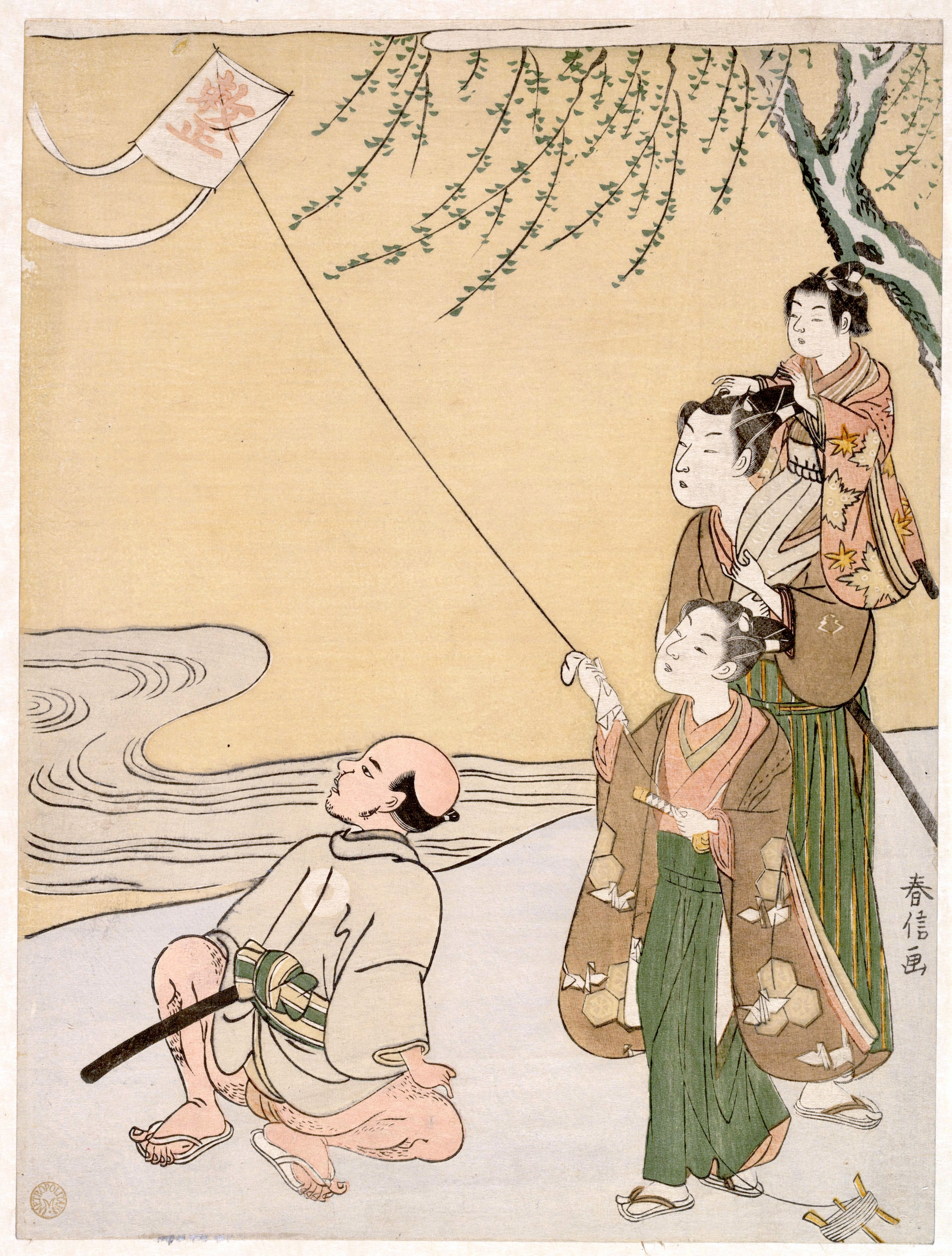
Kite Flying by Suzuki Harunobu, 1766 (Metropolitan Museum of Art)

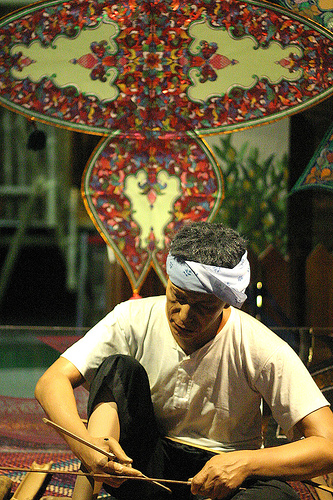
Making a traditional Wau jala budi kite in Malaysia. The bamboo frame is covered with plain paper and then decorated with multiple layers of shaped paper and foil.

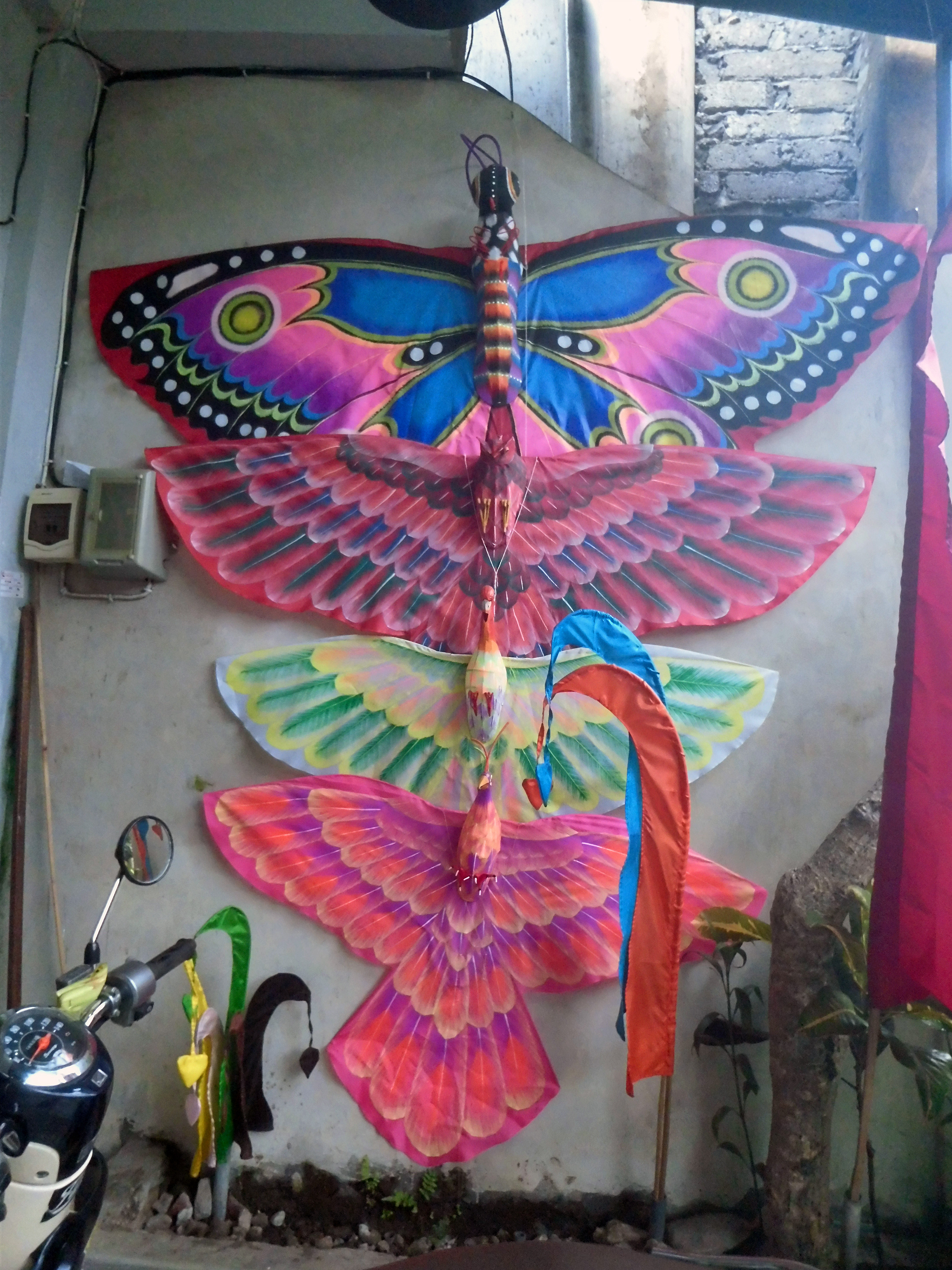
Various Balinese kites is on display in front of a store in Ubud, Bali, Indonesia

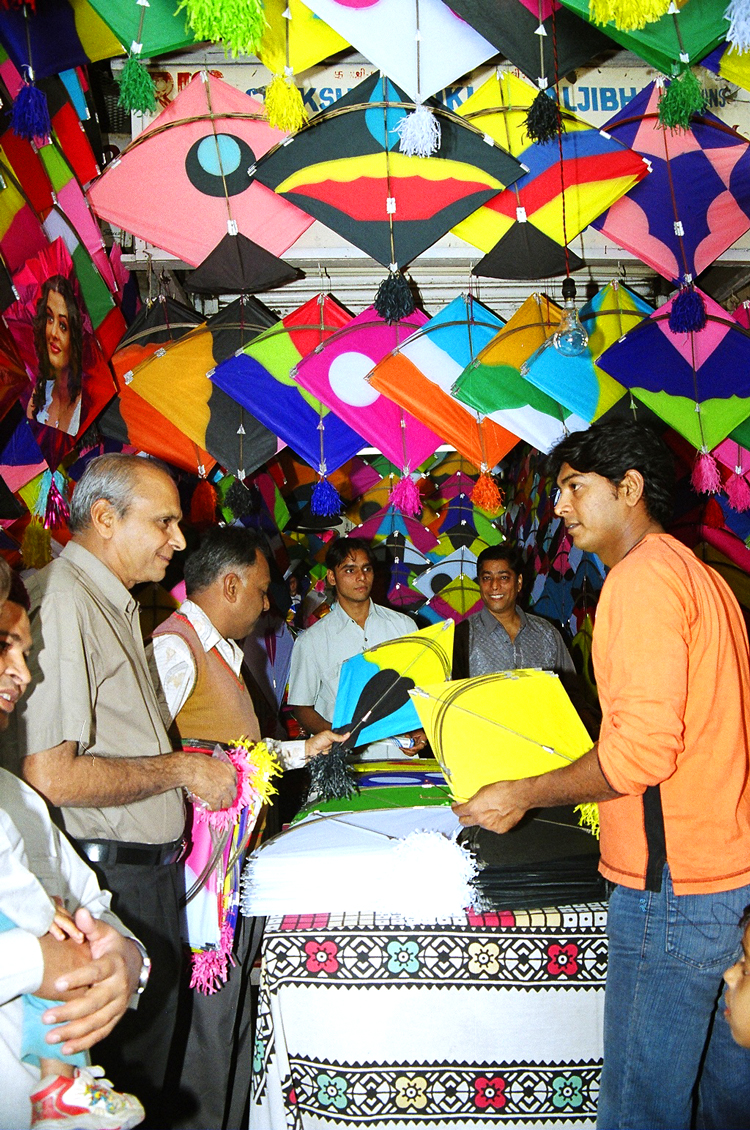
A kite shop in Lucknow, India

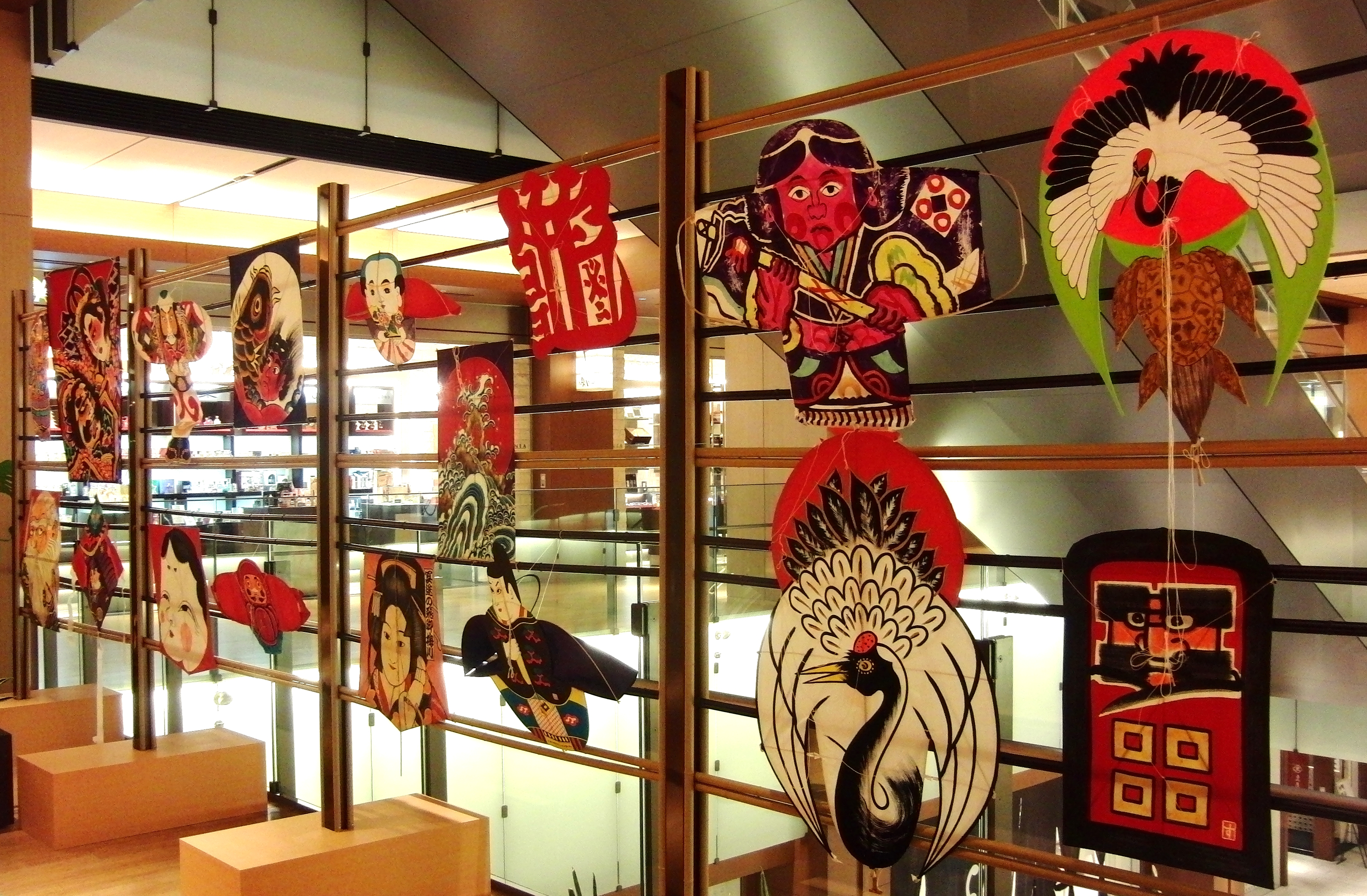
Traditional Japanese kites

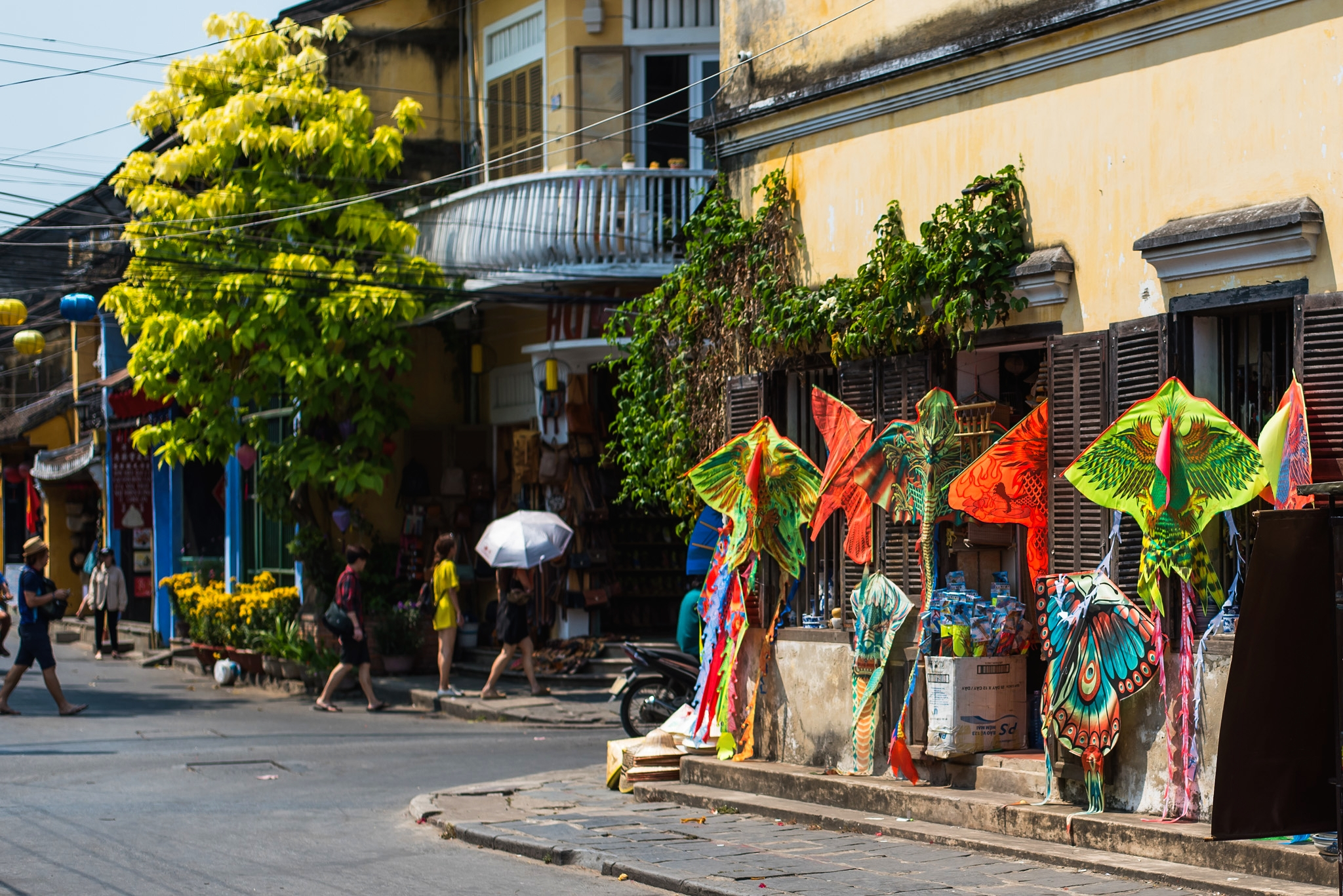
Different kites are sold at a shop in Hội An, Vietnam

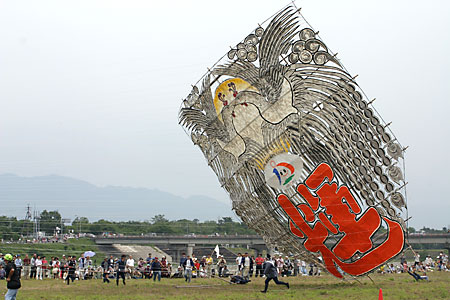
The Yokaichi Giant Kite Festival is held every July in Higashiomi, Shiga, Japan.

=== Europe ===
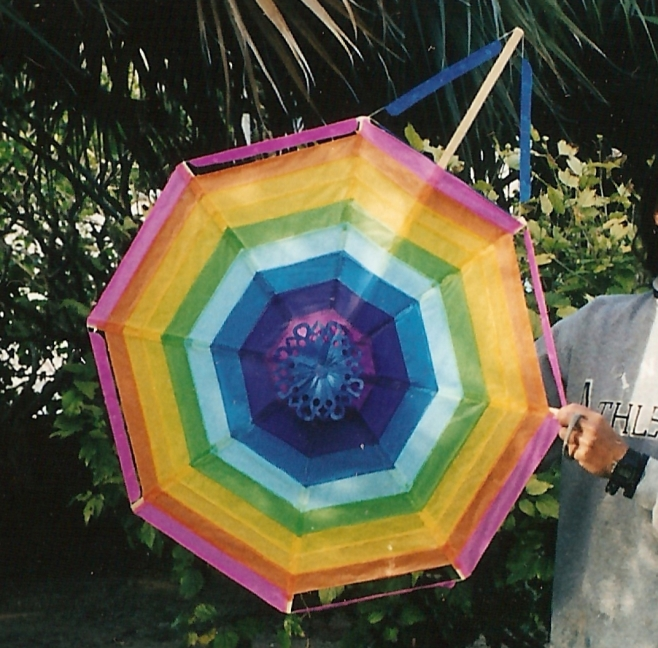
Bermuda kite

In Greece and Cyprus, flying kites is a tradition for Clean Monday, the first day of Lent. In the British Overseas Territory of Bermuda, traditional Bermuda kites are made and flown at Easter, to symbolise Christ's ascent. In Fuerteventura a kite festival is usually held on the weekend nearest to 8 November lasting for 3 days.

=== Polynesia ===
Polynesian traditional kites are sometimes used at ceremonies and variants of traditional kites for amusement. Older pieces are kept in museums. These are treasured by the people of Polynesia.

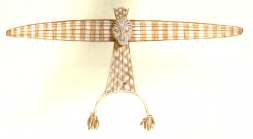
Māori kite

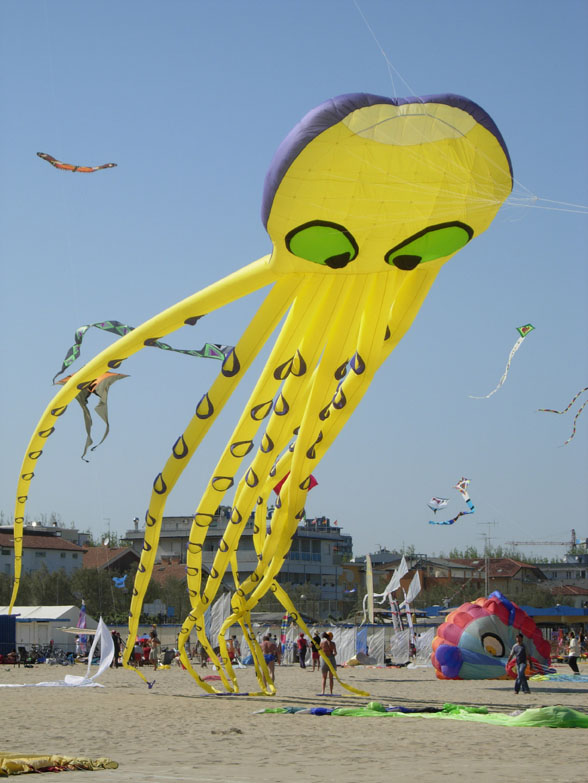
Launch of ram-air inflated Peter Lynn single-line kite, shaped like an octopus and 90 feet (27 m) long

=== South America ===
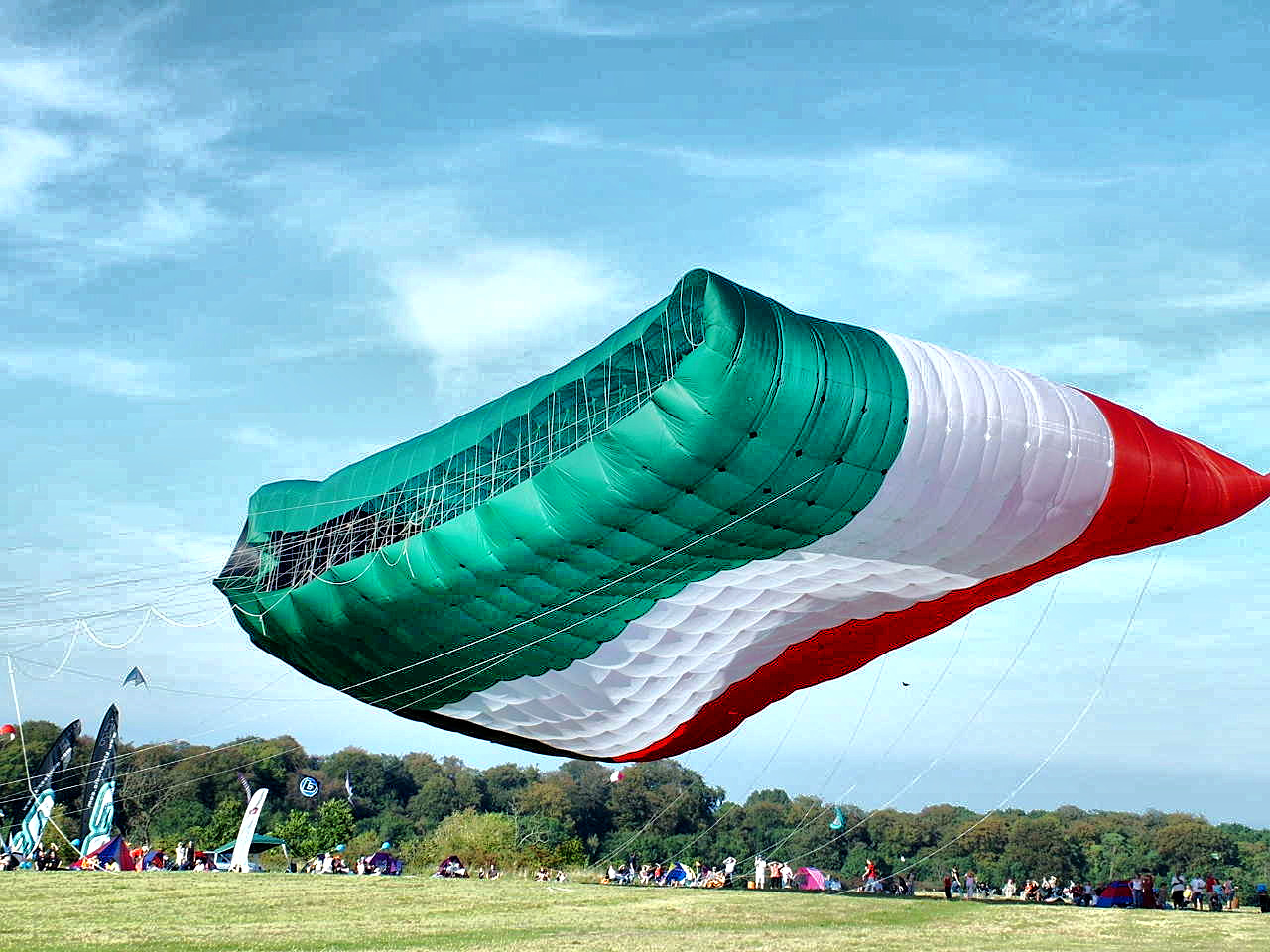
A kite in the shape of the flag of Kuwait. The size when flat is 42 by 25 meters (138 ft × 82 ft), 1,050 square meters (11,300 sq ft). While flying it becomes a little smaller (about 900 square meters (9,700 sq ft)) due to curvature of the edges when inflated.

In Brazil, flying a kite is a very popular leisure activity for children, teenagers and even young adults. Mostly these are boys, and it is overwhelmingly kite fighting a game whose goal is to maneuver their own kites to cut the other persons' kites' strings during flight, and followed by kite running where participants race through the streets to take the free-drifting kites. As in other countries with similar traditions, injuries are common and motorcyclists in particular need to take precautions.

In Chile, kites are very popular, especially during Independence Day festivities (September 18). In Peru, kites are also very popular. There are kite festivals in parks and beaches mostly on August.

In Colombia, kites can be seen flown in parks and recreation areas during August which is calles as windy. It is during this month that most people, especially the young ones would fly kites.

In Guyana, kites are flown at Easter, an activity in which all ethnic and religious groups participate. Kites are generally not flown at any other time of year. Kites start appearing in the sky in the weeks leading up to Easter and school children are taken to parks for the activity. It all culminates in a massive airborne celebration on Easter Monday especially in Georgetown, the capital, and other coastal areas. The history of the practice is not entirely clear but given that Easter is a Christian festival, it is said that kite flying is symbolic of the Risen Lord. Moore describes the phenomenon in the 19th century as follows:

A very popular Creole pastime was the flying of kites. Easter Monday, a public holiday, was the great kite-flying day on the sea wall in Georgetown and on open lands in villages. Young and old alike, male and female, appeared to be seized by kite-flying mania. Easter 1885 serves as a good example. "The appearance of the sky all over Georgetown, but especially towards the Sea Wall, was very striking, the air being thick with kites of all shapes and sizes, covered with gaily coloured paper, all riding bravely on the strong wind.

— (His quotation is from a letter to The Creole newspaper of December 29, 1858.)

The exact origins of the practice of kite flying (exclusively) at Easter are unclear. Bridget Brereton and Kevin Yelvington speculate that kite flying was introduced by Chinese indentured immigrants to the then colony of British Guiana in the mid 19th century. The author of an article in the Guyana Chronicle newspaper of May 6, 2007 is more certain:

Kite flying originated as a Chinese tradition to mark the beginning of spring. However, because the plantation owners were suspicious of the planter class (read "plantation workers"), the Chinese claimed that it represented the resurrection of Jesus Christ. It was a clever argument, as at that time, Christians celebrated Easter to the glory of the risen Christ. The Chinese came to Guyana from 1853–1879.

== World records ==
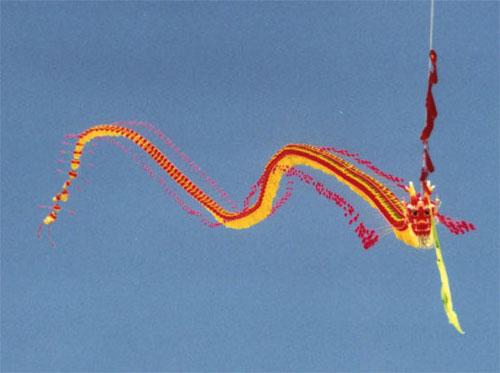
Chinese dragon kite more than one hundred feet long which flew at the annual Berkeley, California, kite festival in 2000

There are many world records involving kites. The world's largest kites are inflatable single-line kites. The world record for the largest kite flown for at least 20 minutes is "The Flag of Kuwait".

The world record for most kites flown simultaneously was achieved in 2011 when 12,350 kites were flown by children on Al-Waha beach in Gaza Strip.

The single-kite altitude record is held by a triangular-box delta kite. On 23 September 2014 a team led by Robert Moore, flew a 129 square feet (12 m^{2}) kite to 16,009 feet (4,880 m) above ground level. The record altitude was reached after eight series of attempts over a ten-year period from a remote location in western New South Wales, Australia. The 9.2 feet (3 m) tall and 19.6 feet (6 m) wide Dunton-Taylor delta kite's flight was controlled by a winch system using 40,682 feet (12,400 m) of ultra high strength Dyneema line. The flight took about eight hours from ground and return. The height was measured with on-board GPS telemetry transmitting positional data in real time to a ground-based computer and also back-up GPS data loggers for later analysis.

== General safety issues ==
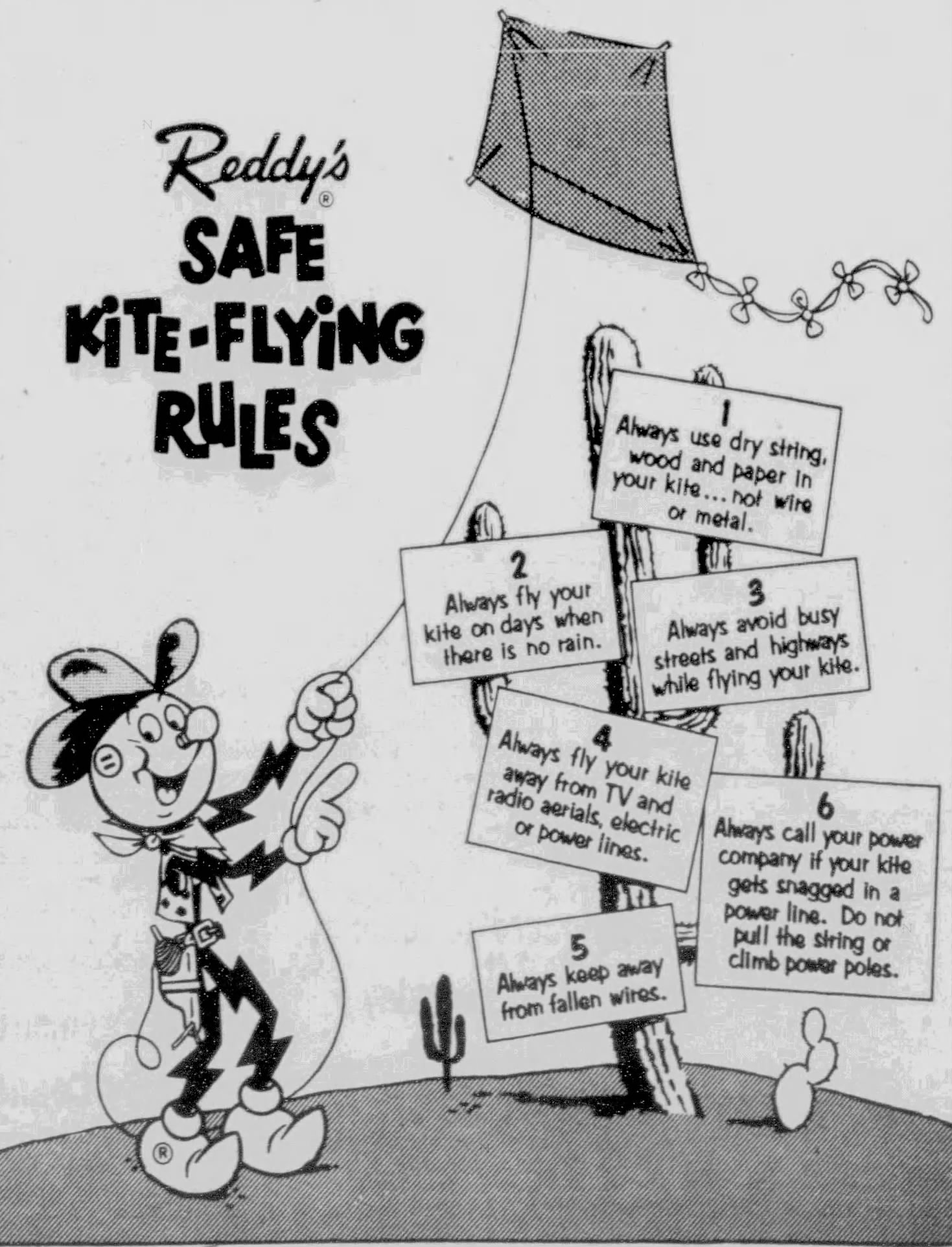
Kite-flying safety tips

There are safety issues involved in kite-flying. Kite lines can strike and tangle on electrical power lines, causing power blackouts and running the risk of electrocuting the kite flier. Wet kite lines or wire can act as a conductor for static electricity and lightning when the weather is stormy. Kites with large surface area or powerful lift can lift kite fliers off the ground or drag them into other objects. In urban areas there is usually a ceiling on how high a kite can be flown, to prevent the kite and line infringing on the airspace of helicopters and light aircraft. It is also possible for fighter kites to kill people, as happened in India when three spectators were killed in separate incidents during Independence Day, August, 2016—precipitating a ban on certain types of enhanced line.

The government of Egypt banned kite-flying in July 2020, seizing 369 kites in Cairo and 99 in Alexandria, citing both safety and national security concerns.

== Designs ==
- Bermuda kite
- Bowed kite, e.g. Rokkaku
- Cellular or box kite
- Chapi-chapi
- Delta kite
- Foil, parafoil or bow kite
- Leading edge inflatable kite
- Malay kite see also wau bulan (Moon kite)
- Tetrahedral kite
- Sled kite

=== Gallery ===
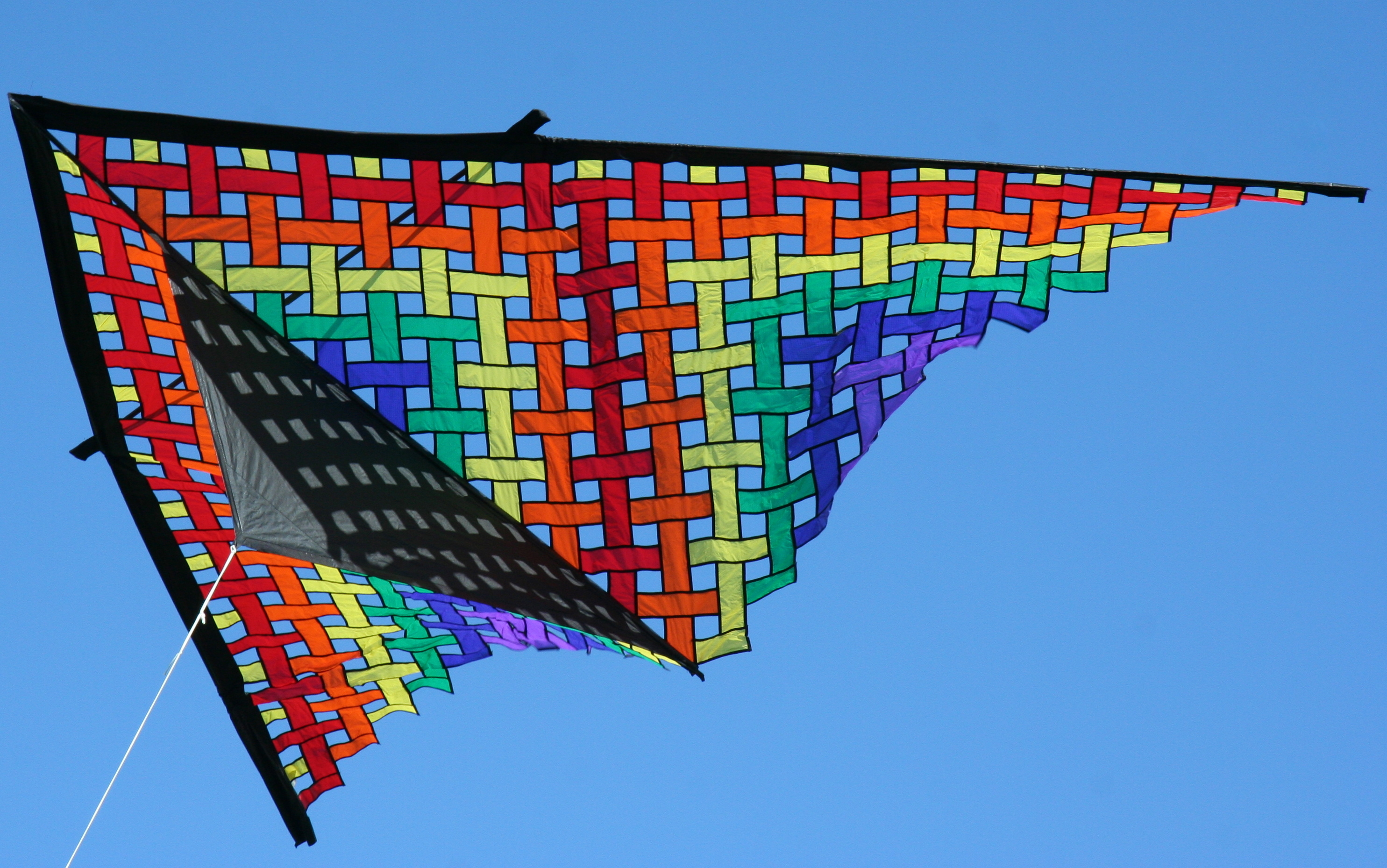
This delta kite has a keel instead of a bridle

Giant Japanese kite launched, 2019

Train of connected kites

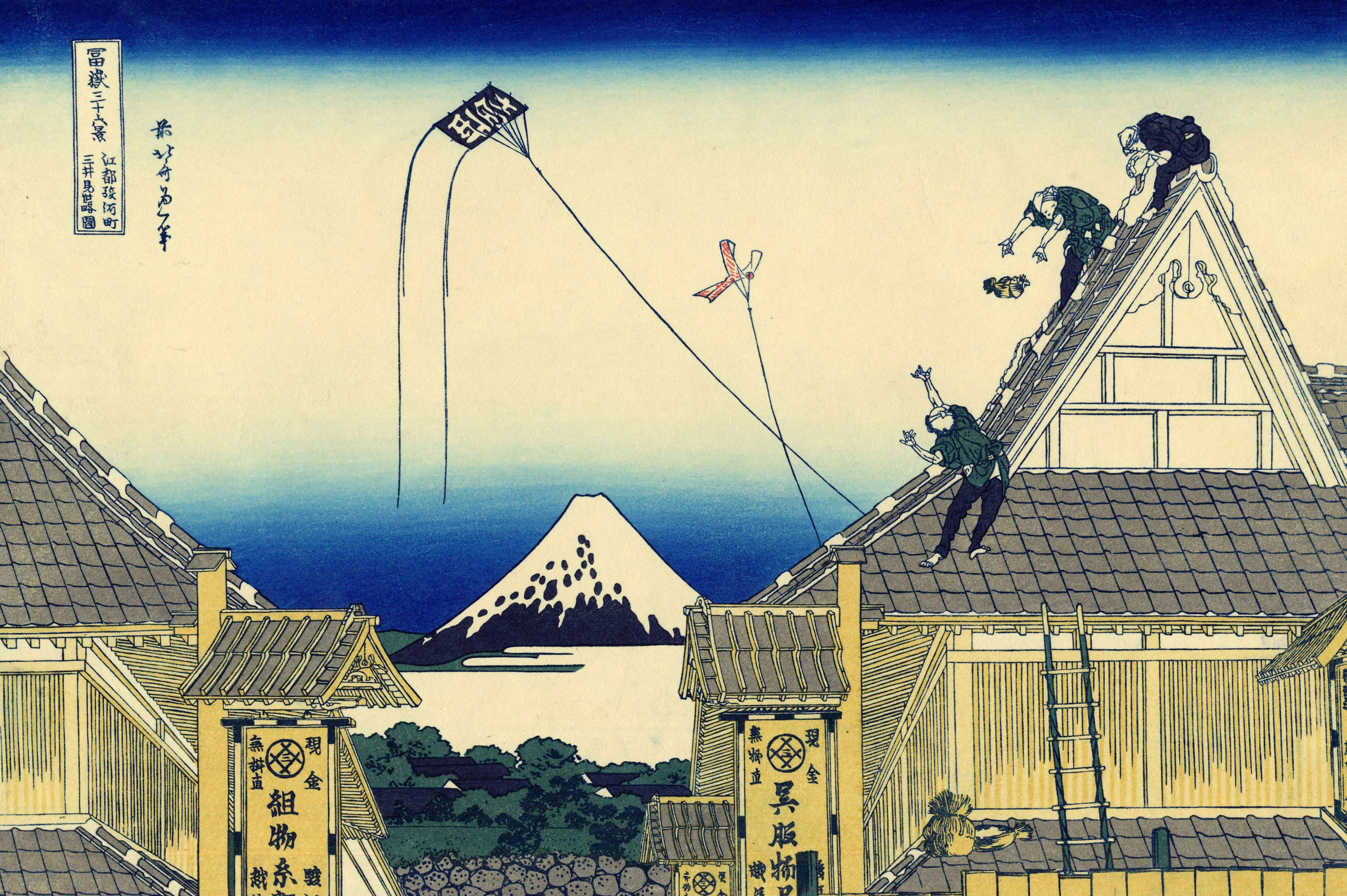
Kites fly on top of the Mitsui Store where the craftsmen are working on top of the roof, print by Hokusai

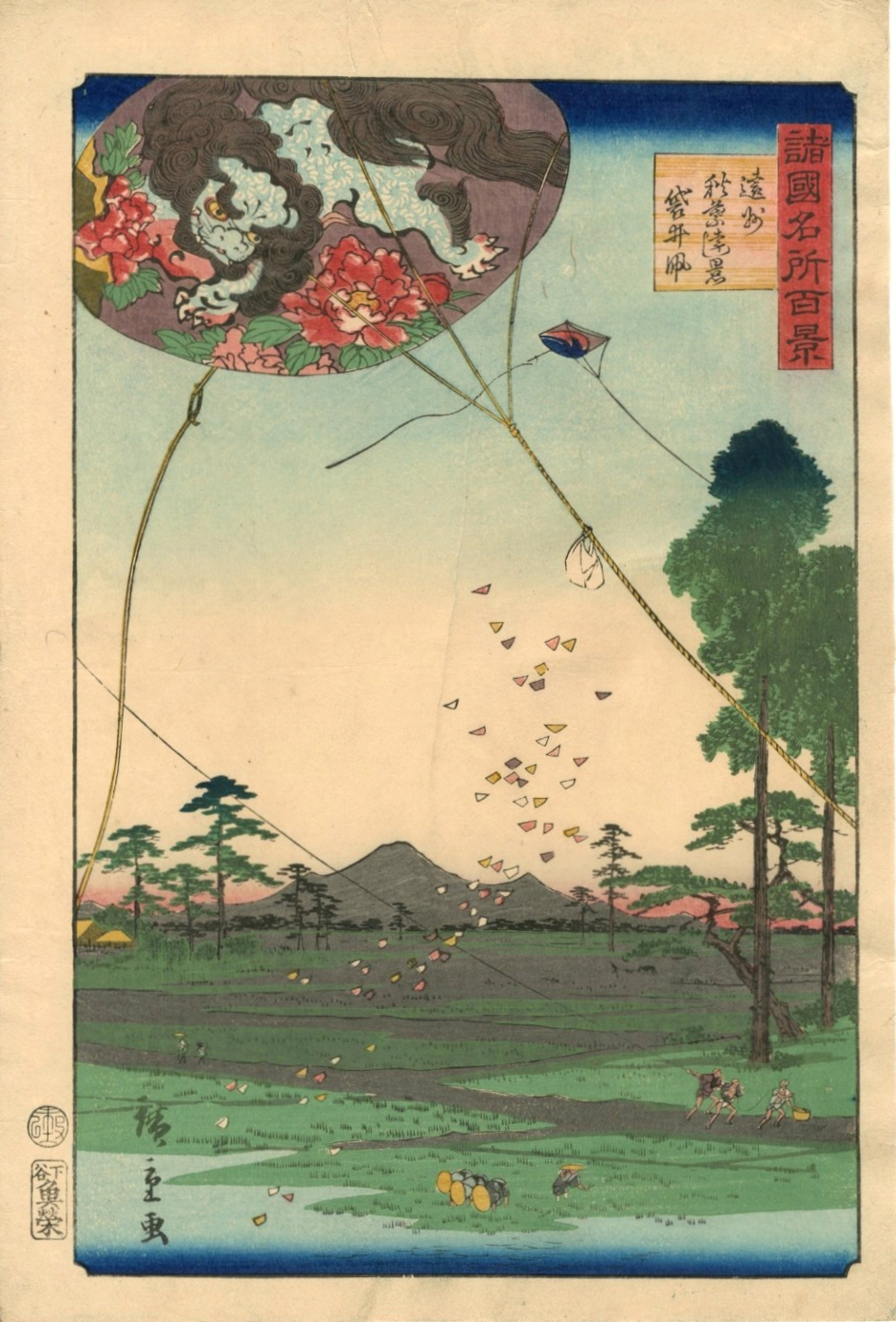
Hiroshige II Enshū Akiha (1859)

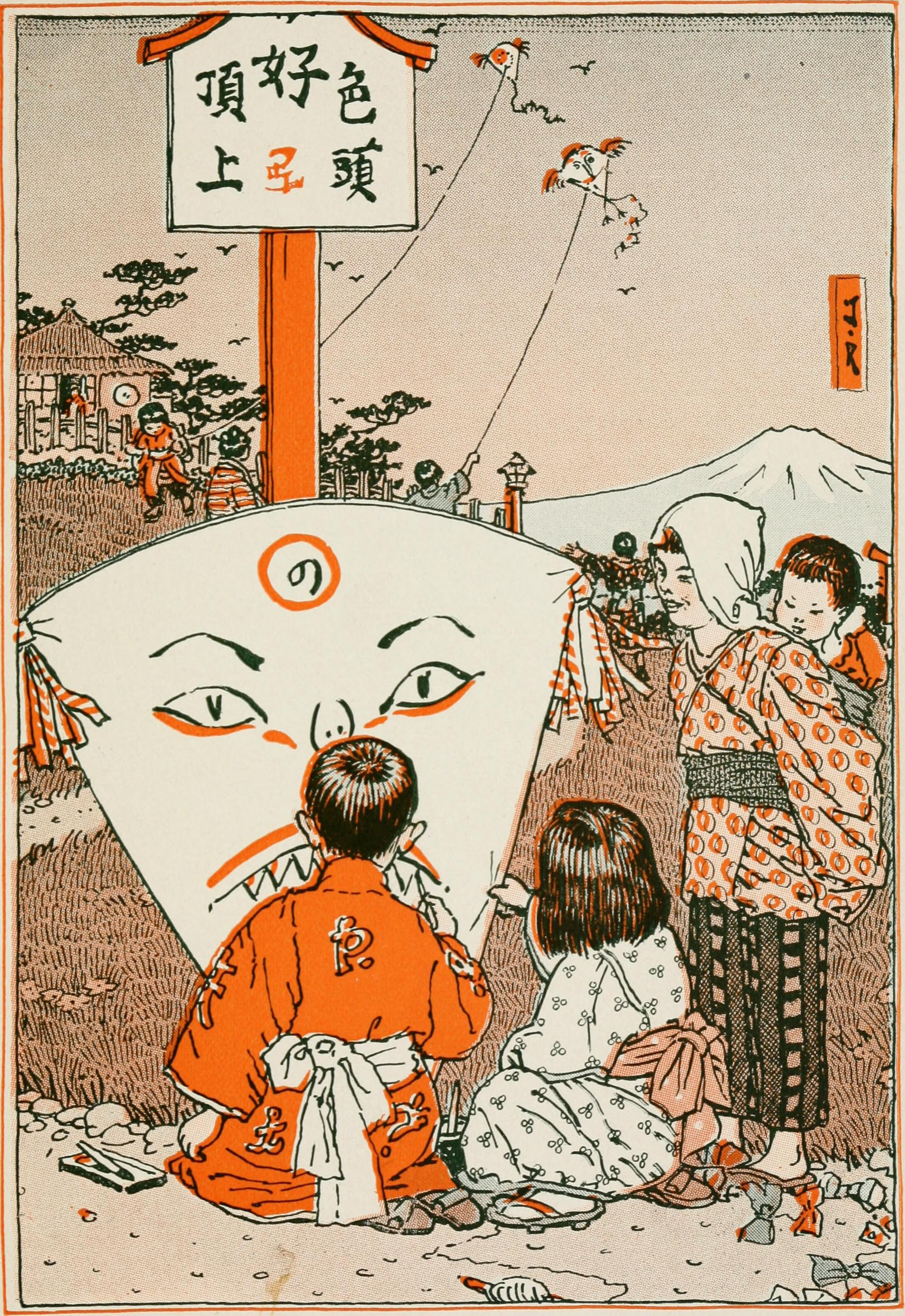
Illustration from the book Story of the Mince Pie (1916) by Josephine Scribner Gates

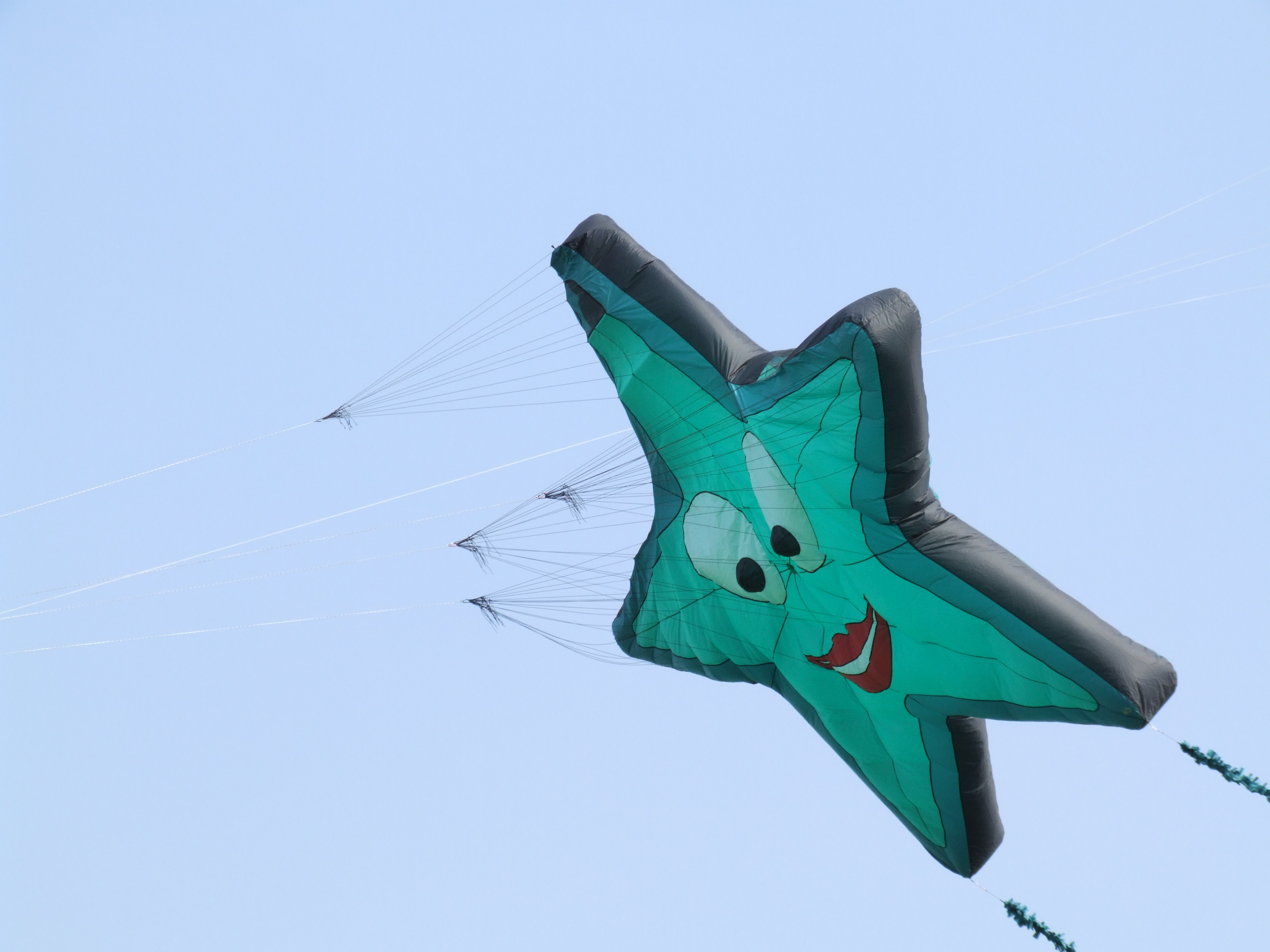
Star-shaped kite above a meadow south of Hockenheim, Germany. This sparless, ram-air inflated kite, has a complex bridle formed of many strings attached to the face of the wing.

== Types ==
- Fighter kite
- Indoor kite
- Inflatable single-line kite
- Kytoon - a hybrid tethered craft comprising both a lighter-than-air balloon as well as a kite lifting surface
- Man-lifting kite
- Rogallo parawing kite
- Stunt (sport) kite
- Water kite

== See also ==
- Airborne wind turbine, concept for a wind generator flown as kite
- Captive helicopter
- Captive plane
- High altitude wind power
- Kite aerial photography
- Kite buggying
- Kite fishing
- Kite ice skating
- Kite landboarding
- Kite shape
- Kiteboating
- Kitelife, an American magazine devoted to kites
- Kitesurfing
- Kite rig
- List of kite festivals
- Sea Tails, video installation
- Solar balloon, a solar-heated hot air balloon that can be flown like a kite, but on windless days.
- Uttarayan, the kite flying festival of western India
- Weifang International Kite Festival

	Aerostat	Aerodyne		
	Lift: Lighter than air gas	Lift: Fixed wing	Lift: Unpowered rotor	Lift: Powered rotor
Unpowered free flight	(Free) balloon	Glider	Helicopter, etc. in autorotation	(None – see note 2)
Tethered (static or towed)	Tethered balloon	Kite	Rotor kite	(None – see note 2)
Powered	Airship	Airplane, ornithopter, etc.	Autogyro	Gyrodyne, helicopter
