= Scott sled =

Type of kite

A Scott Sled is a type of kite developed in the early 1960s by Frank Scott of Ohio and based on the sled kite, an earlier design by William Allison, also based in Ohio. In 1964 it was featured in Kite Tales, the newsletter of the American Kitefliers Association; as a result it became much more widely known. Many derivative designs have appeared since then, the design described here is as it appeared in 1964.

Basic design of a Scott Sled

Scott Sled in flight

Allison patented his kite in 1956; Scott never did. Allison won a civil cease and desist order against the Scott family after it had made and sold millions of kites.

The design is known for its ease of construction, sturdiness, light weight, portability, stability, and good performance. It is a sort of scoop-shaped parachute, held open by parallel spars. Most of the shape of the kite is produced by the pressure of the wind.

== Description ==
The cover is made of polyethylene sheet about 0.0015 inches (0.04 mm) thick. Three vertical spars are taped to the cover. These spars are wooden dowels 1/8 or 3/16 inch (3 to 5 mm) in diameter. A two-legged bridle is used, one leg taped to each side of the cover. The length of this bridle is between 6 and 9 feet (1.8 and 2.7 m) long. Care is taken to make sure each leg is of the same length.

This kite type has continued to evolve, generally with only two spars. Vents are shaped differently, sometimes more vents or none at all.
