= Military radio antenna kites =

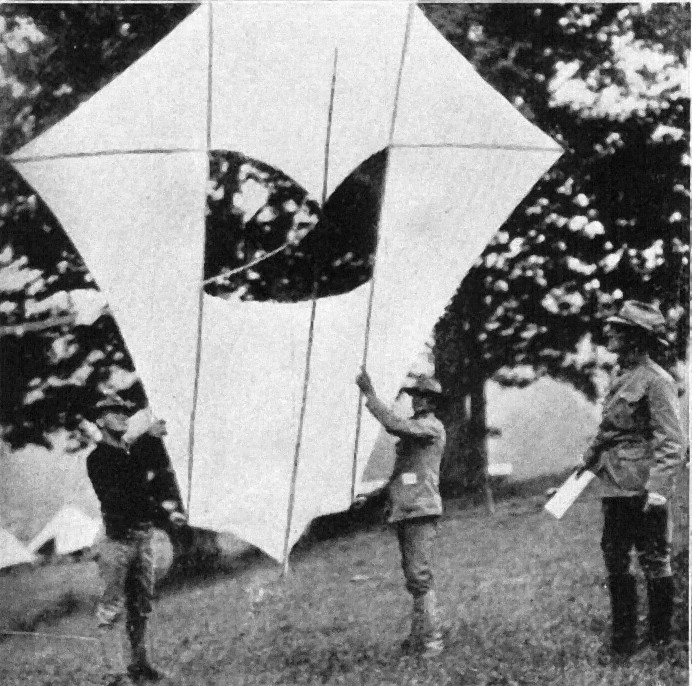
A "King" kite used by the U.S. Signal Corps.

Radio antenna kites are used to carry a radio antenna aloft, higher than is practical with a mast. They are most often associated with portable radio systems, usually with pre-World War I field equipment, and were also occasionally used to increase radio range on Naval ships. The use of kite supported antennae was limited because of difficulty in maintaining consistent antenna height, unpredictability of the wind, and improvements in radio antenna, transmission, and reception. During World War II and after, they were used in conjunction with survival radios issued to aircraft flying over-water missions.

== History ==
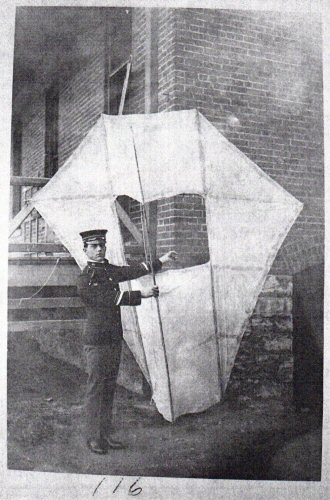
King Kite, Fort Leavenworth, Kansas c. 1905

Before their radio use, kites were used by the United States and other nations' armed forces for observation, aerial photography, and signaling. They were used non-militarily to hoist radio antennae at least since 1898 when Greenleaf Whittier Pickard used a small box kite, normally used for meteorological observations, to raise a wire half a mile up for wireless tests at the Blue Hill Meteorological Observatory in Milton, Massachusetts.

On December 12, 1901 Guglielmo Marconi sent the first transatlantic radio signal from Poldhu, Cornwall, England, to St. Johns, Newfoundland. The antenna at St. John's was carried by a Baden-Powell Levitor kite, designed by Baden Baden-Powell as a man-carrying observation kite.

== The King kite ==
The first kite used by the United States Army Signal Corps specifically for raising an antenna was designed and built by Sergeant Thomas I. King, Signal Corps Company A, while stationed at Fort Leavenworth, Kansas, in 1905. The “King” kite was large, 7 feet high and 5 feet wide, made of 15 yards of white Japanese silk on a bamboo frame, and weighed less than 2 pounds. Similar to Silas J. Conyne's kite of 1902, it had a diamond shape with a squared-off top and bottom, keel, and large opening in the center to give it some of the stability of a box kite. It was used either singly or in trains of 2 to 4 kites or, on less windy days, in conjunction with a balloon to provide extra lift.

The King kite was used with small portable spark-gap transmitters, and the elevated antenna made little improvement in the distance signals could be transmitted. It did significantly improve in receiving, and signals could be heard from as far away as Cuba on a receiver using an electrolytic detector.

== Experiments with Bell tetrahedral kites ==
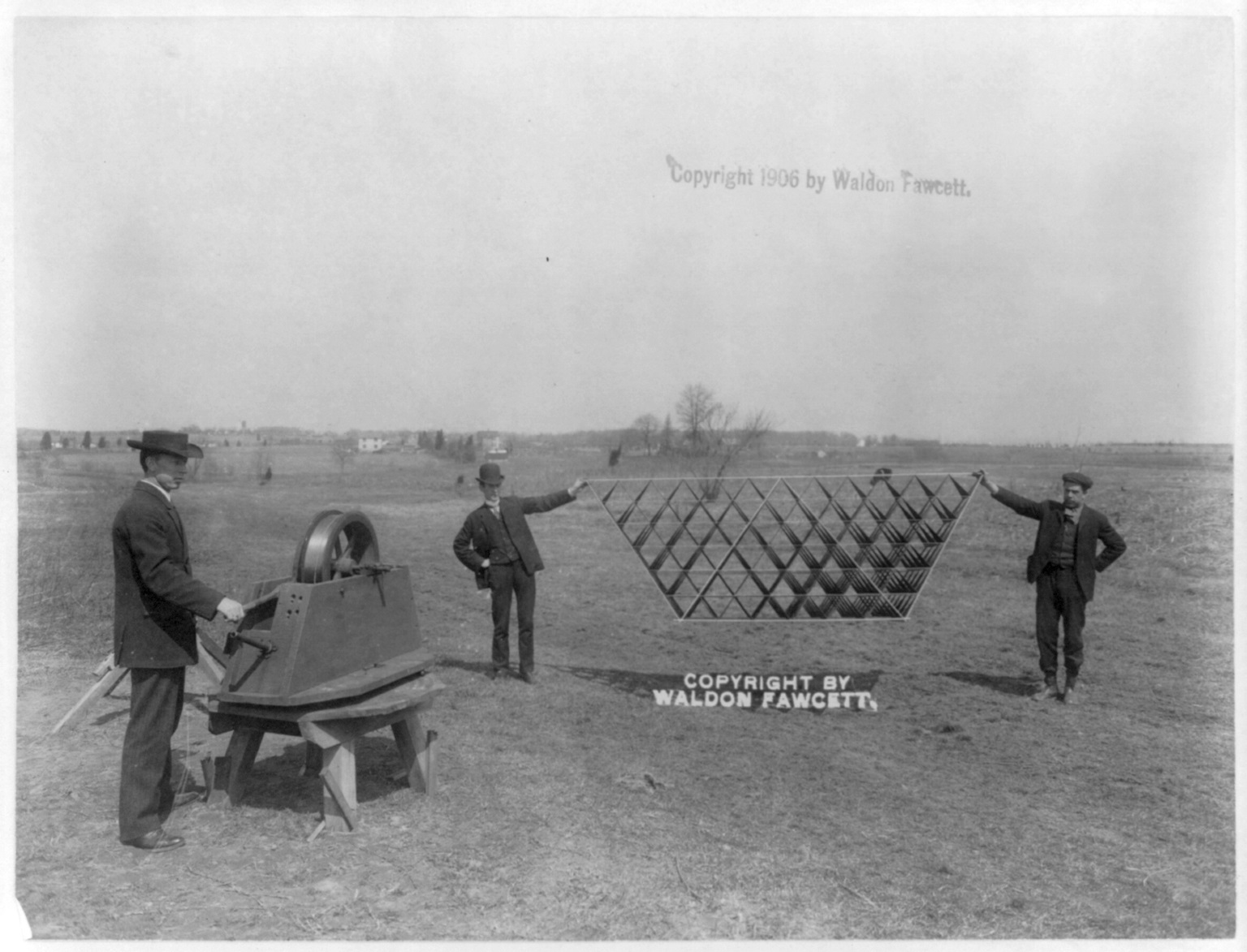
Tetrahedral kite built by Alexander Graham Bell being used to lift a radio antenna, 1906.

In the spring of 1906 Alexander Graham Bell and Lee deForest teamed up to experiment with Dr. Bell's tetrahedral kites as antenna lifters. Bell had been experimenting with kites in hopes of developing a flying machine. A large, 230 cell kite was used to lift an antenna 400 feet into the air at a station near Fort Myer, Virginia. Signals were successfully sent and received by the Naval wireless telegraph station at the Washington Navy Yard. The message was sent by retired General Henry Harrison Chase Dunwoody, who was working for deForest at the time.

== KI-1, KI-2 and KI-3 kites ==
The United States Signal Corps for a time maintained three models of antenna lifting kites as standard equipment. They were listed in the Signal Corps Storage Catalogue as late as 1920.

Kite KI-1, formerly designated the "folding Malay kite", was made of spruce rods glued and wired together, covered with cloth, measuring 60 by 60 inches. It was used with portable field wireless sets.

The King kite, somewhat modified, was renamed and became standard Signal Corps equipment, available in two types. Kite KI-2 was the smaller at 6 feet high by 6 feet wide, while KI-3 was 7 1/2 by 7 1/2. Both had spruce sticks with a rim of 32 gauge stranded wire, with a covering of "light slate-colored percale". They were intended for use with the SCR-44 field wireless set, a pre-World War I pack set, something still specified in the 1920 Storage Catalogue despite the SCR-44 being obsolete, and listed as so in the same Storage Catalogue.

== Army and navy experiments ==
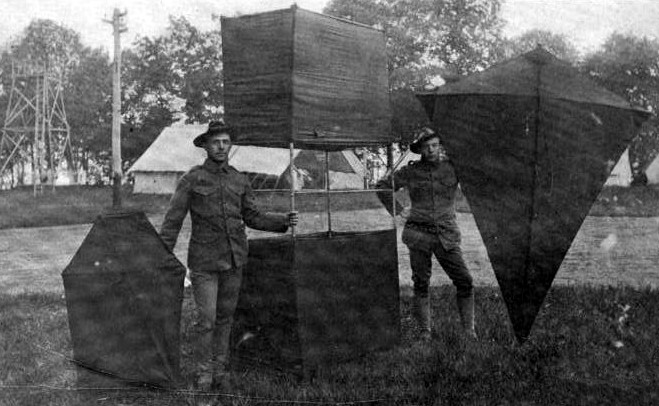
Kites built to raise signal flags and radio antennae, First Company, Signal Corps, National Guard of New York, 1907.

The British Royal Navy experimented with kite raising antennae on HMS Good Hope in 1903, using a box kite designed by Samuel Franklin Cody. A 300-foot kite raised antenna increased their radio range from 60 or 70 miles to 110 miles. The United States Navy conducted kite antenna experiments on the torpedo boats USS Stringham and USS Bailey in 1911.

Some Signal Corps units conducted kite antenna experiments independently, often constructing their own kites. In June 1907 the First Company, Signal Corps, National Guard of New York, made box, Malay and hexagon shaped kites, to experiment with raising standard international code flag signals and radio antennae.

In 1915 Adjutant General of Massachusetts Charles H. Cole, after hearing that the German ship Prinz Eitel Friedrich had good results using kites to suspend a radio antenna, decided to experiment with kite supported antennae himself. He asked Samuel F. Perkins, a manufacturer of man lifting kites, to assist with the tests at the July maneuvers of the Massachusetts National Guard. Perkins' original configuration, four kites in a chain with an antenna leading from the ground to some point on the kites' tether, swayed up and down considerably, causing the antenna to vary in length, and making tuning difficult. This had been a problem since kites were used for raising antennae, and had all but forced their abandonment after the early experimental years. Perkins was able to solve the problem easily by attaching the antenna at a height corresponding to the kites' lowest position when swaying normally. The antenna itself acted as a tether and kept the kite's string from rising between the point of attachment and the ground. The kite was still able to rise and fall, but only the part of the string between the antenna and the kite itself could rise, and the antenna remained a constant length. The tests were considered a success, and messages sent using a field wireless set with the kite antenna were heard 150 miles away, where the same set could transmit only 25 miles normally.

== Emergency radios ==
=== Early emergency radio use ===
The United States Navy experimented with kites for emergency radio use as early as 1922 when Commander Taylor and Lieutenant C. D. Palmer of the Anacostia Air Station Radio Laboratory designed kites to lift antenna for radios in downed seaplanes. The aircraft of the day had trailing antenna that only functioned while in flight. Two kites were issued, one for stronger and the other for lighter winds, as well as a reel of light antenna wire and a small generator that could be placed in the air stream of a functioning engine to power the radio.

=== Kites M-277-A and M-357-A ===
In 1941 the German military issued the NSG2 or "Notsender" emergency radio for use in lifeboats. It included a winged box kite to raise the antenna. An NSG2 was captured by the British in 1941 and copied as the "Dinghy Transmitter" T-1333. At first the British used a box kite with the set, but by 1943 were using a kite, similar to Silas J. Conyne's 1911 design, that could be launched by a Very pistol.

A second captured NSG2 was brought to the American army by the British, improved on and issued as the SCR-578-A "Gibson Girl" survival radio in 1942. It was carried by United States Army Air Forces aircraft and intended for use in life rafts. It included the M-277-A collapsible box kite to raise the antenna, which was also included in some of the later SCR-578-B sets. It was similar to the kite included with the NSG2 but did not include the wings. The 17 x 17 x 36 inch frame of the M-277-A was made up of 4 aluminum rods, each rod end was attached at the ends by a hinge to 4 shorter rods, and each of these met in the middle, attached by a locking mechanism, so that the whole thing could be opened up like an umbrella. The yellow cloth was treated with water repellent and part of one section filled with kapok to add buoyancy if it fell into the water. It was designed to be simple to assemble, and could fly in winds from 7 to 40 miles per hour. It packed into a cardboard tube, on which were also printed the assembly instructions.

Kite M-357-A is identical to M-277-A except that the frame could be separated into two pieces, the four main rods attached in their centers by ferrules. The whole thing could be stored in a space 2 by 4 by 19 inches. Instructions for assembly were printed on the upper cloth. M-357-A was issued with the SCR-578-B (some sets included the remaining stock of M-277-A) and the post-war AN/CRT-3, still in use in the early 1970s.

Both kites had two bridle attachment points, one for winds 7–20 miles per hour, the other for 15–40 miles per hour. The SCR-578 and AN/CRT-3 also included a small balloon and hydrogen generator to raise the antenna if there was no wind, however, because the hydrogen generator was caustic and the hydrogen flammable, the kite was the preferred method.

M-277-A	M-357-A	Instructions for assembling M-357-A

== See also ==
- List of military electronics of the United States
