= Single-line =

Single-line may refer to:

- Inflatable single-line kite, one of the few modern inventions in the world of kite design
- Single-line diagram, a simplified notation for representing a three-phase power system in power engineering
- Single-line working, the practice of using one track out of two on a double track railway
- Single-track railway

== See also ==
- Single yellow line
