= Bermuda kite =

Geometric kite flown in Bermuda

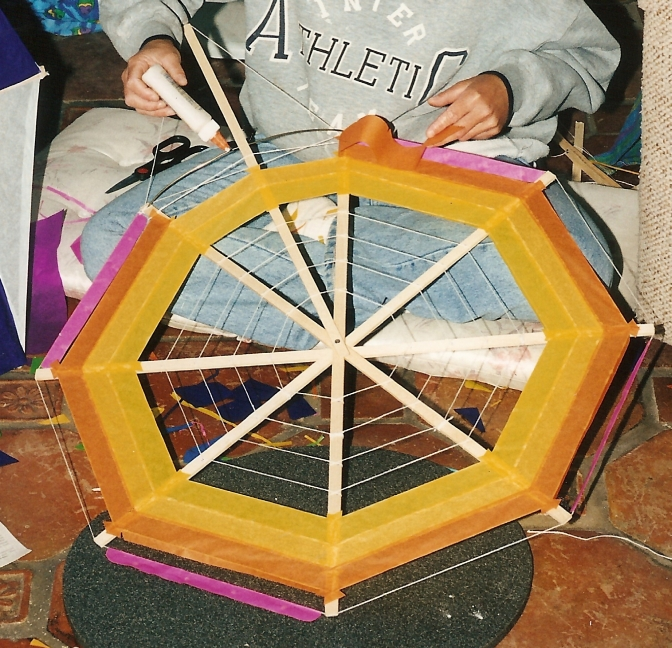
A Bermuda kite under construction

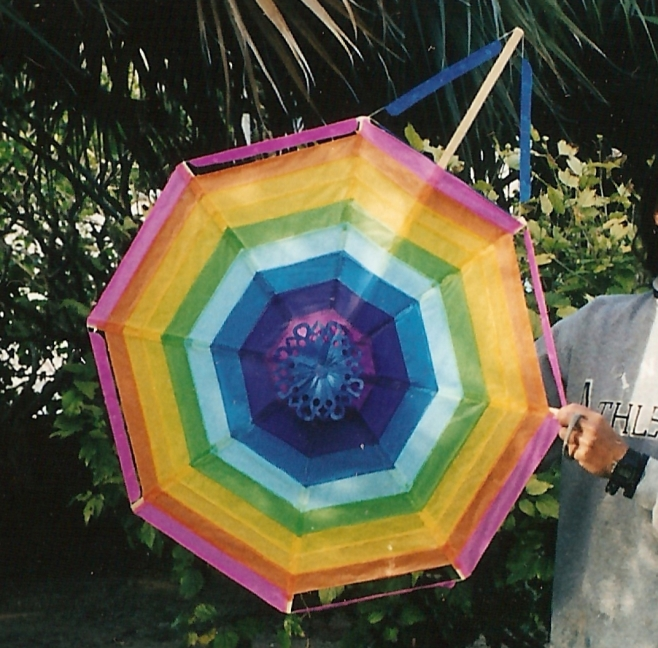
The completed kite, minus its tail

A Bermuda kite is a kite made using traditional geometric designs, are quite colorful, and is an art form as much as a recreational tool. They are traditionally flown in Bermuda only at Easter. The kites are typically hexagonal, though larger examples, particularly, may be octagonal, or have even more sides. They are constructed from flat sticks arrayed like spokes of a wheel, with a nail at the axis. A string passes around the ends of the sticks, marking out the edges, and concentric strings are arranged inside of this, all contributing to the rigidity of the structure. Colored tissue paper is glued into the spaces created between strings and sticks. Using different colors, patterns are created. The kite has a single stick secured at one end to the axis, and rising at a shallow angle from the plane created by the other sticks. This stick, which forms the head of the kite, extends considerably beyond the perimeter of the hexagon. It passes over the midpoint of one side of the hexagon, and a string creates a triangular shape from the corner at one side of the head stick, to its tip, and back to the opposite corner. Strips of paper are folded and glued along this string. A long, cloth strip tail is fitted to the kite, without which it would be unable to fly.

Every Good Friday, Bermudians fly traditional kites to symbolize Christ's resurrection.
