= Inflatable single-line kite =

Inflatable kite design

The inflatable single-line kite, developed by Domina Jalbert in the 1960s, was a significant innovation in kite design. Unlike rigid-framed kites, parafoils use ram-air pressure to maintain their aerodynamic shape. Earlier flexible-wing concepts developed by Francis Rogallo anticipated some related aerodynamic principles, but the parafoil design became especially influential in modern foil kites and parachute technology.

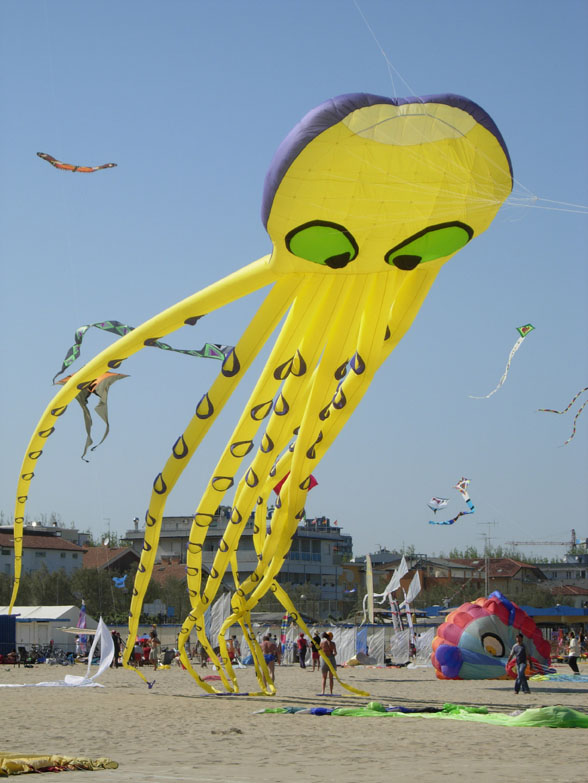
27 m Peter Lynn Octopus kite flown at Cervia International Kite Festival, Italy 2007. The multi line bridle is connected to a single kite line of 4 mm spectra

Kytoons and balloon kites are inflatable kites. Kites sometimes combine ram-air inflation as well as closed-bladder inflation. The shape is loosely derived from an airfoil with air inlets usually at the front, and a bridle which distributes the tether line loads evenly across the whole base of the kite. These kites have no rigid spars.

The immense strength of synthetic fabrics allows the creation of non-rigid three-dimensional shapes which hold their shape because the pressure of the air inside the kite is slightly higher than the pressure outside.

As with hot air balloons, artistic creativity is often applied, so that fish, cats, and many other animals and characters are depicted. Sizes range from 2 m in length to 65 m. The world's largest kites are inflatable single-line kites designed and made by New Zealand kitemaker Peter Lynn.

== Types of inflatable single-line kites ==
- Ram-air-only soft fully flexible kite
- Ram-air-only inflation with spars also
- Gas inflatable kytoons. These are variously inflated with air, helium, hydrogen. When the kite wing is heavier-than-air, then the kytoon needs relative wind to fly. When the kite wing is lighter-than-air then the kytoon will stay aloft when the relative wind is below what is needed for kiting.
- Kites that combine both ram-air inflation and gas-bladders that are inflated.

== See also ==
- List of inflatable manufactured goods
- Francis Rogallo
- Domina Jalbert
