= Captive helicopter =

Helicopter tethered to the ground with a rope

A captive helicopter is a helicopter which is tethered to the ground with a rope, as with a captive balloon. Captive helicopters can be used for the same purposes as captive balloons.

A primary advantage of captive helicopters is that they can be more accurately steered than captive balloons or kites in order to compensate for the influence of the wind. A further advantage is that, unlike kites, they can be launched in the absence of wind. Their main disadvantages are that they require power for their flight and are very noisy.

Unlike kites (which rely solely on the wind for power) and balloons (which require specialty lighter-than-air gases), helicopters are normally powered by aviation fuels. However, it is possible to run captive helicopters electrically by running a cable inside the tether line holding the helicopter.

In 1887, Parisian electrical engineer Gustave Trouvé demonstrated his tethered electric model helicopter at a meeting of the French Association for the Advancement of Sciences in Toulouse. At the end of the 1930s, the German company Telefunken tried to make a longwave transmission experiment with a captive helicopter driven with a three-phase, AC-power engine. The helicopter should have reached a height of 1000 metres. Because of electrostatic charges induced by earth's electric field, the fuses melted when the helicopter reached a height of 750 metres and it landed hard.

== See also ==
- Captive balloon
- Captive plane
- Kite
- AEG helicopter
