= Man-lifting kite =

Kite designed to lift a person from the ground

Roald Amundsen, the polar explorer, is lifted from the ground using a man-lifting kite during tests in 1909.

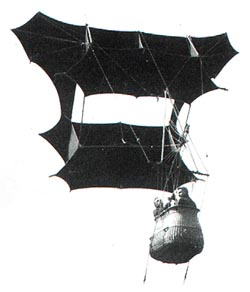
Man-lifter War Kite designed by Samuel Franklin Cody (1867–1913).

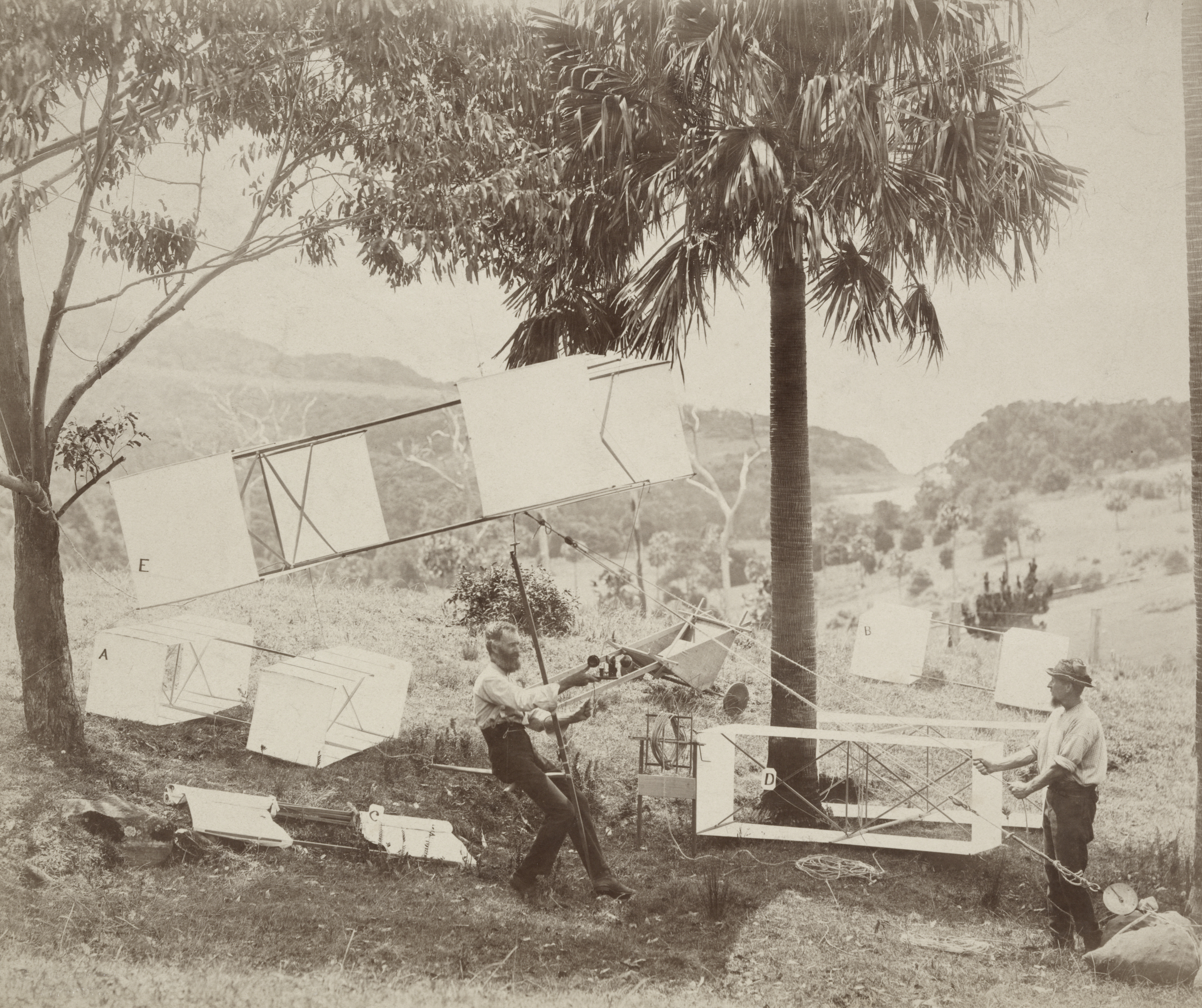
Lawrence Hargrave (seated) with his man-lifting kites in Stanwell Park, 1894.

A man-lifting kite is a kite designed to lift a person from the ground. Historically, man-lifting kites have been used chiefly for reconnaissance. Interest in their development declined with the advent of powered flight at the beginning of the 20th century. Recreational man-lifting kites gradually gained popularity through the latter half of the 20th century, branching into multiple sports. In the 21st century man-lifting kites are often used in kitesurfing, where brief launches can be followed by safe water landings and parasailing, where kites are towed behind a vehicle.

== Early history ==
Man-carrying kites were used in ancient China for both civil and military purposes, and sometimes used as a punishment. The Book of Sui, dating from 636 AD, records that the tyrant Gao Yang, Emperor Wenxuan of Northern Qi (r. 550–559), executed prisoners by ordering them to 'fly' using bamboo mats. The (1044) Zizhi Tongjian records that in 559, all the condemned kite airmen died except for Eastern Wei prince Yuan Huangtou. "Gao Yang made Yuan Huangtou and other prisoners take off from the Tower of the Phoenix attached to paper owls. Yuan Huangtou was the only one who succeeded in flying as far as the Purple Way, and there he came to earth." The Purple Way, a road, was 2.5 km (1.6 mi) from the approximately 33-metre (108 ft) tall Golden Phoenix Tower.

Reports of man-carrying kites also exist in Japan, following the introduction of the kite from China around the seventh century AD. In one such story the Japanese thief Ishikawa Goemon (1558–1594) is said to have used a man-lifting kite to allow him to steal the golden scales from a pair of ornamental fish images which were mounted on the top of Nagoya Castle. His men manoeuvered him into the air on a trapeze attached to the tail of a giant kite. He flew to the rooftop where he stole the scales, and was then lowered and escaped. It is said that at one time there was a law in Japan against the use of man-carrying kites.

In 1282, the European explorer Marco Polo described the Chinese techniques then current and commented on the hazards and cruelty involved. To foretell whether a ship should sail, a man would be strapped to a kite having a rectangular grid framework and the subsequent flight pattern used to divine the outlook.

== Industrial age ==
In the 1820s British inventor George Pocock developed man-lifting kites, using his own children in his experimentation.

In the early 1890s, Captain B. F. S. Baden-Powell, soon to become president of the Aeronautical Society of Great Britain, developed his "Levitor" kite, a hexagonal-shaped kite intended to be used by the army in order to lift a man for aerial observation or for lifting large loads such as a wireless antenna. At Pirbright Camp on June 27, 1894, he used one of the kites to lift a man 15 metres (50 ft) off the ground. By the end of that year he was regularly using the kite to lift men above 30 metres (100 ft). Baden-Powell's kites were sent to South Africa for use in the Boer War, but by the time they arrived the fighting was over, so they were never put into use.

Lawrence Hargrave had invented his box kite in 1885, and from it he developed a man-carrying rig by stringing four of them in line. On 12 November 1894 he attached the rig to the ground on a long wire and lifted himself from the beach in Stanwell Park, New South Wales, reaching a height of 5 metres (16 ft). The combined weight of his body and the rig was 94 kg (208 lb).

Alexander Graham Bell developed a tetrahedral kite, constructed of sticks arranged in a honeycomb of triangular sections, called cells. Bell and his team, the Aerial Experiment Association, also developed biplane structures and curved wing shapes. The group correctly predicted the reduced structural requirements would provide a better lift-to-weight ratio; large contemporary box designs increased in weight faster than their lift, but a tetrahedral kite could be expanded with a near-constant ratio. Bell's team flew over water to reduce the risk both to the aviator and machine, writing: "If the man is able to swim, and the machine to float upon water, little damage need be anticipated to either". His first large experiment with self-similar tetrahedral patterns was "The Frost King" with 1300 cells, weighing 131 kilograms (288 lb) including the aviator. Bell advanced in models from the "Cygnet I", "Cygnet II", and "Cygnet III", reaching a 3,393-cell model; the 12-metre (40 ft) long, 90-kilogram (200 lb) kite was towed by a steamer in Baddeck Bay, Nova Scotia on December 6, 1907 and carried a man 51 metres (168 ft) above the sea.

Samuel Franklin Cody was the most successful of the man-lifting kite pioneers. He patented a kite in 1901, incorporating improvements to Hargrave's double-box kite. He proposed that its man-lifting capabilities be used for military observation. After a stunt in which he crossed the English Channel in a boat drawn by a kite, he attracted enough interest from the Admiralty and the War Office for them to allow him to conduct trials between 1904 and 1908. He lifted a passenger to a new record height of 490 metres (1,600 ft) on the end of a 1,200-metre (4,000 ft) cable. The War Office officially adopted Cody's War Kites for the Balloon Companies of the Royal Engineers in 1906, and they entered service for observation on windy days when the Companies' observation balloons were grounded. Like Hargrave, Cody strung up a line of multiple kites to lift the aeronaut, while greatly improving on the details of the lifting gear. He later built a "glider kite" which could be launched on a tether like a kite but then released and flown back down as a glider. The Balloon Companies were disbanded in 1911 and were reformed as the Air Battalion of the Royal Engineers, a forerunner of the Royal Air Force.

Roald Amundsen, the polar explorer, commissioned tests on a man-lifting kite to see whether it would be suitable for observation in the Arctic, but the trials were unsatisfactory and the idea was never developed.

== Modern kiting ==
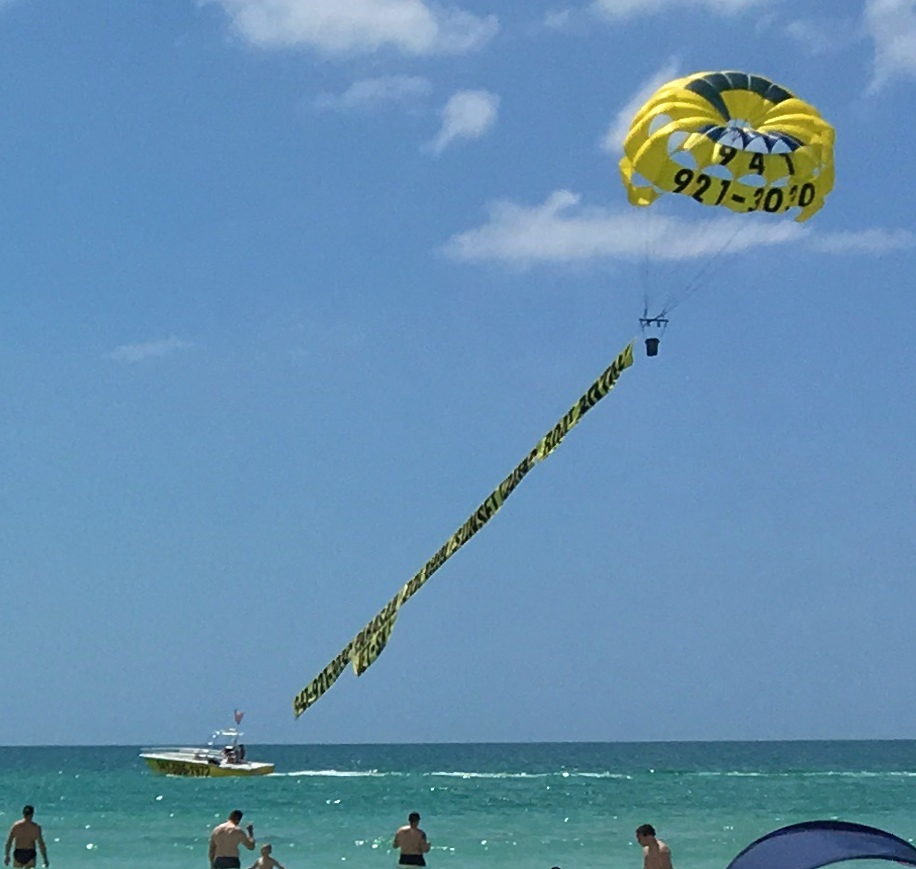
A kite in the form of a tethered parachute.

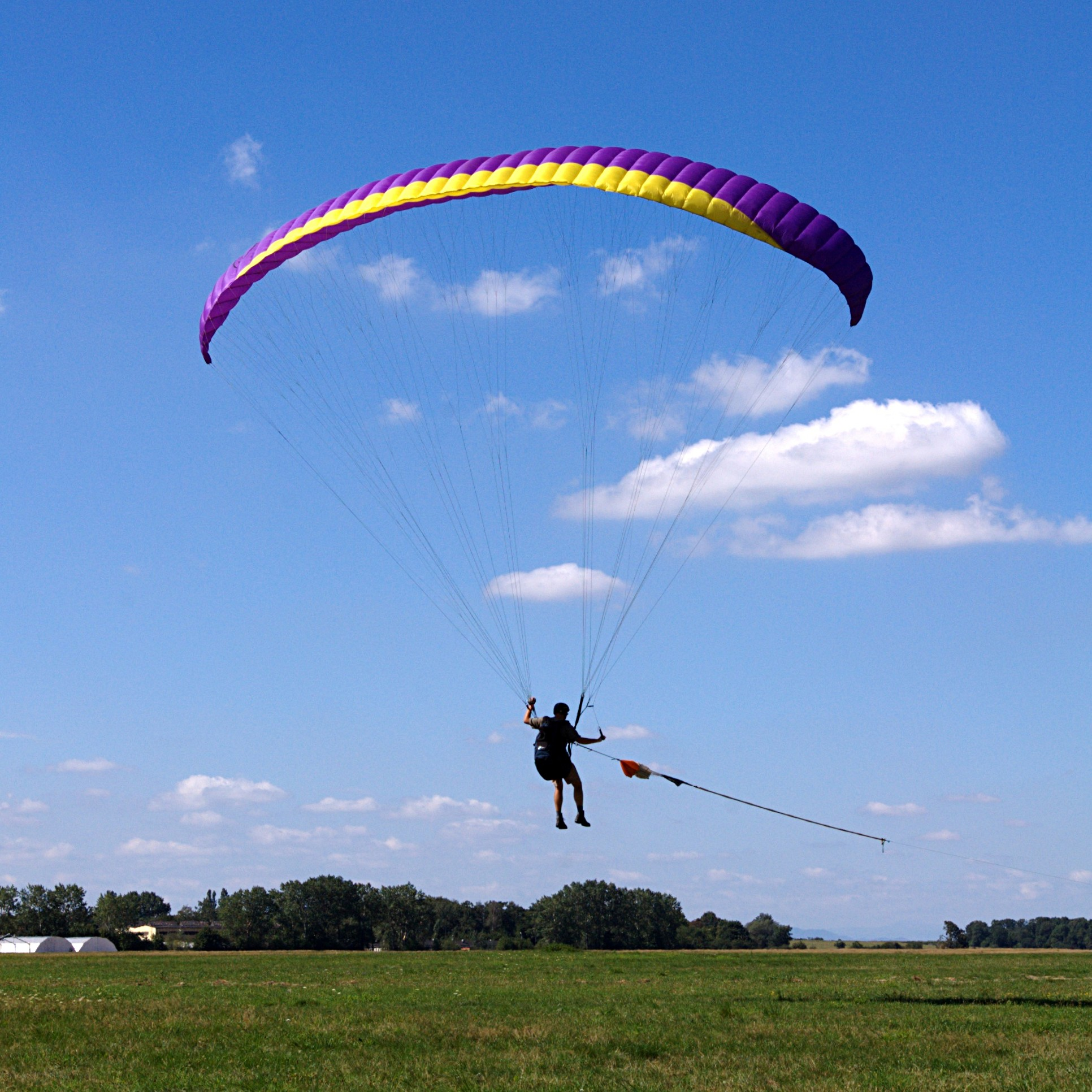
A paraglider being tow-launched as a kite.

A series of innovations in the late 20th and early 21st century revitalized interest in the field of people being lifted by kites for recreation. The growth of water skiing especially led to the idea of adding a kite, so that the skier could take off and fly.

From the late 1950s, flat kites began to be used to propel the skier, while other kites were fitted with seats on the line pulled by a motorboat. The skier was able to marginally control these unstable flat kites by using swing seats that allowed their entire body weight to effect pitch and roll.

Through the 1960s the Rogallo wing was developed and many early types such as Australian John Dickenson in Australia Bill Bennett's Delta Wing series were developed as manned kites. John Worth adopted the cable-stayed triangle control frame at several scales in stiffened Rogallo wing kite glider and powered versions. John Dickenson used a tow boat to kite himself in his adaptation of the Ryan flexible-wing craft, a version of the stiffened Rogallo-wing kite in September 1963. Dickenson's designs for man-lifting kites and gliders earned him several awards, with some organizations calling him the inventor of the modern hang glider. Fellow Australian Bill Bennett continued to develop and sell his Delta Wing series through the 1970s.

The invention of the parafoil kite in 1964 and gradual adoption further enabled kites in watersports, as parafoil sails provide tremendous lift and can be controlled as a multiline kite. Parachute-powered kiteboarding or kitesurfing spread around the world as a sport by the 1970s. Over the next two decades, parafoils were increasingly seen alongside parachutes, and single line lift systems were replaced with steerable multi-line configurations.
