= Kytoon =

Aircraft

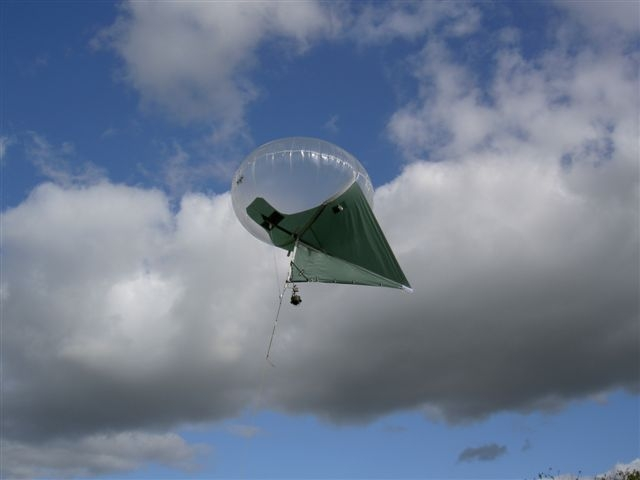
A Helikite kytoon lifting a gyro-stabilised camera

A kytoon or kite balloon is a tethered aircraft which obtains some of its lift dynamically as a heavier-than-air kite and the rest aerostatically as a lighter-than-air balloon. The word is a portmanteau of kite and balloon.

The primary advantage of a kytoon is that it remains in a reasonably stable position above the tether point, irrespective of the strength of wind, whereas ordinary balloons and kites are less stable.

The kytoon has been used for many purposes, both civil and military.

== History ==
In 1919, a handbook was published giving extensive details to support the kite balloon crafts being used in the military. Described is the first kite balloon made in 1893 by Captains Parseval and Sigsfeld at the Berlin works of the Prussian Balloon Battalion; theirs was the "predecessor of the Drachen balloon." "This was the first real kite balloon flying like a kite with a fairly constant angle and direction relative to the wind and remained practically unchanged until the beginning of the war in 1914-1918." A hybrid kite-balloon was patented by Domina Jalbert in 1944 as patent US2431938 and later became known as the kytoon. Jalbert furthered his attention on kite balloons also with another patent filed on August 31, 1945, titled "Kite Balloon".

The Allsopp Helikite is a modern helium-filled example.

== Stability ==
A captive balloon tends to drift down the wind and the harder the wind blows, the further the balloon drifts. This leans the tether over at an angle, pulling the balloon lower. On a kytoon, the kite action lifts the balloon, counteracting this pull and holding the kytoon in position. As the wind blows harder, the kite action lifts harder. This can provide good stability even in strong winds.

In low or gusty winds a kite can nose-dive, losing a large amount of height even if it recovers. Because a kytoon is buoyant it does not nose-dive and remains in position even in relatively still air.

== Applications ==
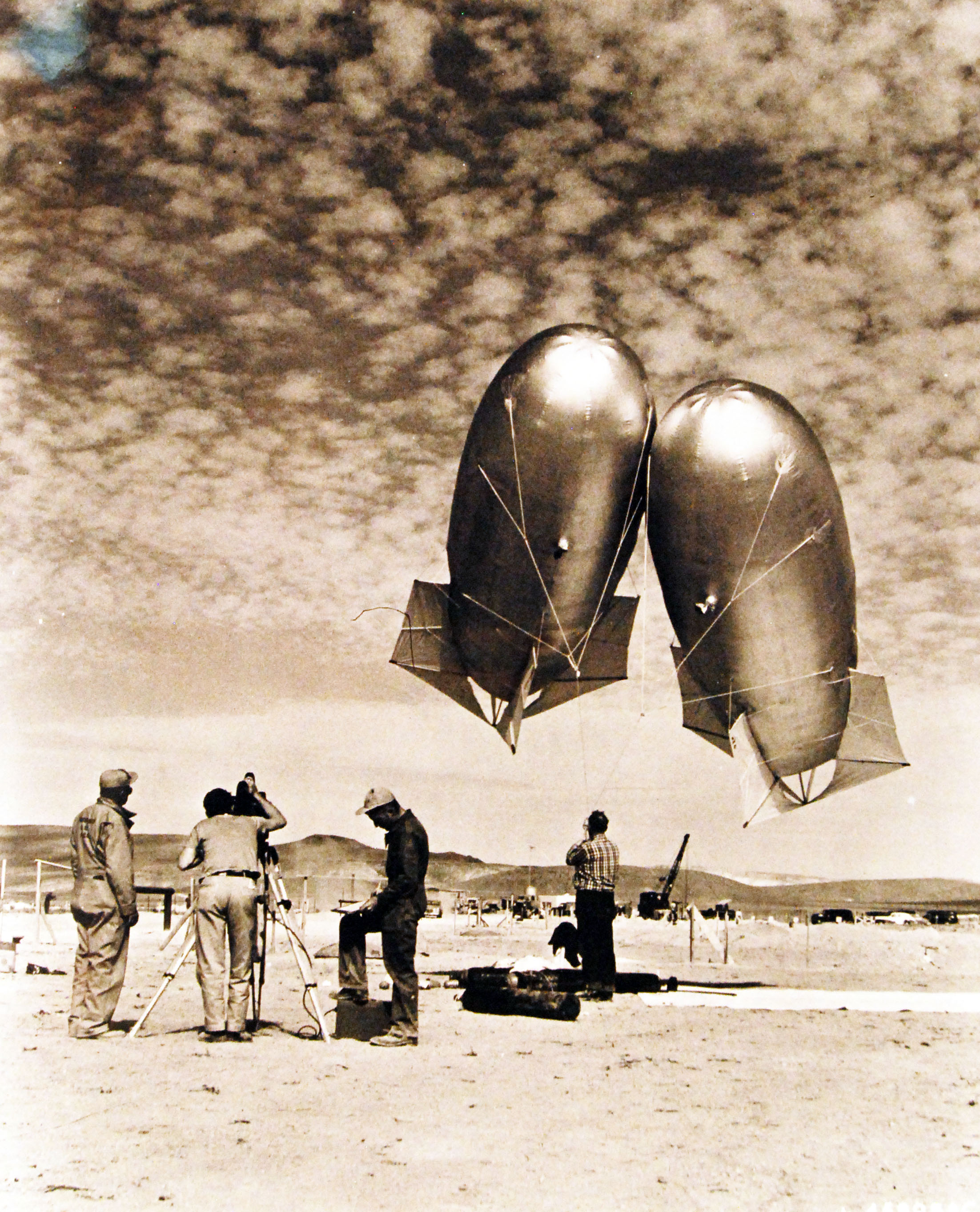
Kytoon balloons were used on Indian Springs Air Force Base, Nevada, April 20, 1952, to get exact weather information during atomic test periods. Balloons were sent aloft before each nuclear test, and were hauled down minutes before the detonation occurred.

Applications of the kytoon have included:

- Raising communications antenna aloft
- Commercial advertising
- Low-level aerial photography
- Airborne wind turbines
- Raising emergency signals in calm or wind
- Meteorological measurements
- Sighting target for conducting geographical surveys
- Scaring birds away from crops
- Recreation

== See also ==
- Aerostat
- Airship
- Buoyancy
- Kite types
- Rotor kite
- Tethered balloon

	Aerostat	Aerodyne		
	Lift: Lighter than air gas	Lift: Fixed wing	Lift: Unpowered rotor	Lift: Powered rotor
Unpowered free flight	(Free) balloon	Glider	Helicopter, etc. in autorotation	(None – see note 2)
Tethered (static or towed)	Tethered balloon	Kite	Rotor kite	(None – see note 2)
Powered	Airship	Airplane, ornithopter, etc.	Autogyro	Gyrodyne, helicopter
