= Domina Jalbert =

American aviator (1904–1991)

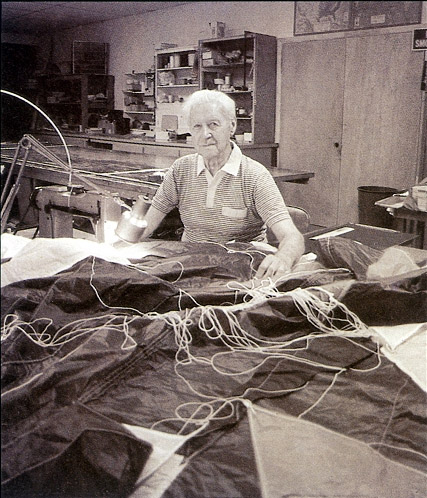

Domina Cleophas Jalbert (1904–1991) invented the ram-air inflated flexible wing, often called the "Jalbert parafoil".

== Personal life ==
Domina Jalbert was born in 1904 in Saint-Michel-des-Saints, Quebec, Canada; his father was Onesime Jalbert (1856–1938) and his mother was Celestine Gouger (1861–1939). He was one of 17 children.

Early in his life he moved to Woonsocket, Rhode Island, where he lived and worked for many years before moving to Boca Raton, Florida, in his older years.

While living in Woonsocket, Jalbert graduated from Woonsocket High School, and later worked as a track coach and administrator for Mount St. Charles Academy.

Jalbert received a U.S. pilots' license in 1927. In the 1930s he was active in kiting, using large kites for advertising purposes. He was hired to help protect the coastline of the western United States during war with the design and making of barrage balloons; he worked for the United States Rubber Company in Naugatuck, Connecticut, US.

Jalbert later moved to New Jersey and was married in 1933 to champion swimmer Elizabeth Becker, and they had one daughter, Dorothy Christina Jalbert (1932–2006). Elizabeth died in 1936, and Domina returned to Rhode Island.

Jalbert was married to Emma Rose Bourcier (1903–1994) on October 28, 1943, in Providence, Rhode Island. The couple moved to Belmont, Massachusetts, and were living there in 1945. They had one son, Paul Charles Jalbert (1945–1992).

Jalbert and his family relocated to Boca Raton, Florida, in 1950.

Jalbert died on June 26, 1991, in Boca Raton, Florida.

== Major achievements in aeronautics ==
In 1942, Jalbert demonstrated the power of his custom-made kite by lifting his daughter, Dorothy Jalbert, in a "kite-swing" at Point Judith, Rhode Island.

He filed a patent in 1944 for a combination of a balloon with a stiffened flexible wing, forming what is now known as a "kytoon".

In 1956, Jalbert tested his square parachute for the first time in Boca Raton, Florida.

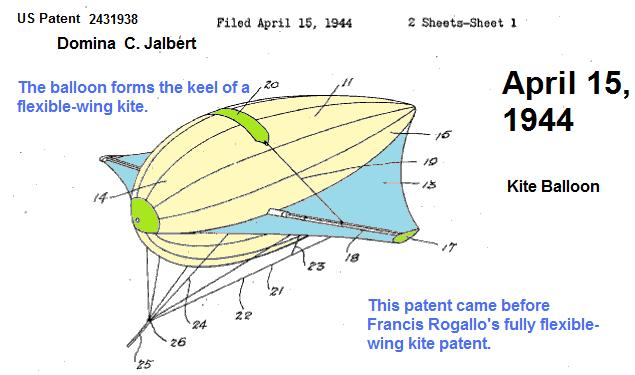
Annotated form of drawing from April 15, 1944 patent for Kite Balloon

In 1957, Jalbert invented the ram-air airfoil and began testing and formalizing the design.

In January 1963 he formally confirmed his discovery and invention of the ram-air double-surfaced fully flexible airfoil that would profoundly change kiting, parachuting, skydiving, hang gliding, paragliding, sport flying, power kiting, and more. All parafoils today owe their roots to Jalbert's invention.

In 1964, he filed a patent titled "Multi-cell Wing Type Aerial Device" This would become key to paragliding, sky diving, powered paragliding, landboarding, kite surfing and cargo-ship kite tugging.

In 1971, Jalbert's dream of creating a ram-air parachute was realized. Working with Jalbert, Theodore Hulsizer, civilian prototype parachute manufacturer for the United States Air Force and NASA (1947–1973), made the first parafoil parachute that worked. While testing his prototype in the wind tunnel at Wright-Patterson Air Force Base in Dayton, Ohio, US, Theodore realized its drag was considerably stronger than any other parachute he had tested in his 25 years of experience. He believed others' attempts ripped to shreds, because of the drag. To slow the opening of the parafoil, Theodore ran the cords through rings he designed that were slid to the top while packing the parachute. As it opened, the rings had to slide down, slowing the opening. These rings later evolved to be the slider in modern ram-air parachutes. Theodore personally made the first full-size parafoil, which worked perfectly in its first drop.

1984 – At age 79 Jalbert traveled to Beijing, China to demonstrate his parafoils.

== Ram-air airfoil of fully flexible materials ==
Jalbert was first to teach of the robust airfoil formed by the ram-air principle. Every contemporary ram-air airfoil sport and utility wing began with Jalbert's invention. When the parafoil is used as a gliding parachute, thus opening after the payload or human has been in free-fall, the opening of the parafoil can be very fast; the fast opening and the consequential related shock has to be damped; devices invented by others are used to slow down the opening of the parafoil. One such invention is the slider. When the parafoil is used in hang gliding as a paraglider, the parafoil is kited open before the human leaves the ground; in such cases a slider is not necessary.

== Patents filed ==
Jalbert invented his filed-for January 10, 1963 US Patent 3131894 the Parafoil which had sectioned cells in an aerofoil shape; an open leading edge and a closed trailing edge, inflated by passage through the air – the ram-air design.

- Kite Balloon. Filing date: April 15, 1944
- Kite Balloon. Filing date: August 31, 1945
- 2398744 Kite Balloon
- Multi-Cell Glide Canopy Parachute D. C. Jalbert
- Multi-Cell Wing Type Aerial Device Filing date: October 1, 1964
- Multi-Cell Wing Type Aerial Device US Pat. 3285546⁣ – Filed October 1, 1964
- Aerial sled Domina C. Jalbert

== Awards ==
- 1986 – Jalbert accepted an award from the Parachute Industry Association.
- 1988 – Inducted to the Rhode Island Heritage Hall of Fame.
- 2019 – Jalbert was posthumously awarded the FAI Gold Air Medal for invention of the multi-cell ram-air wing from the Federation Aeronautique International (World Air Sports Federation).

== See also ==
- Parafoil
- Powered parachute
- High altitude wind power
