= Tetrahedral kite =

Geometric kite pattern

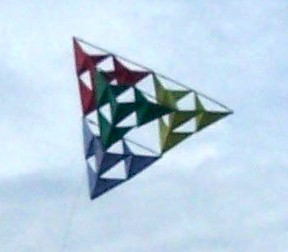
A tetrahedral kite being flown

A tetrahedral kite is a multicelled rigid box kite composed of tetrahedrally shaped cells to create a kind of tetrahedral truss. The cells are usually arranged in such a way that the entire kite is also a regular tetrahedron. The kite can be described as a compound dihedral kite as well.

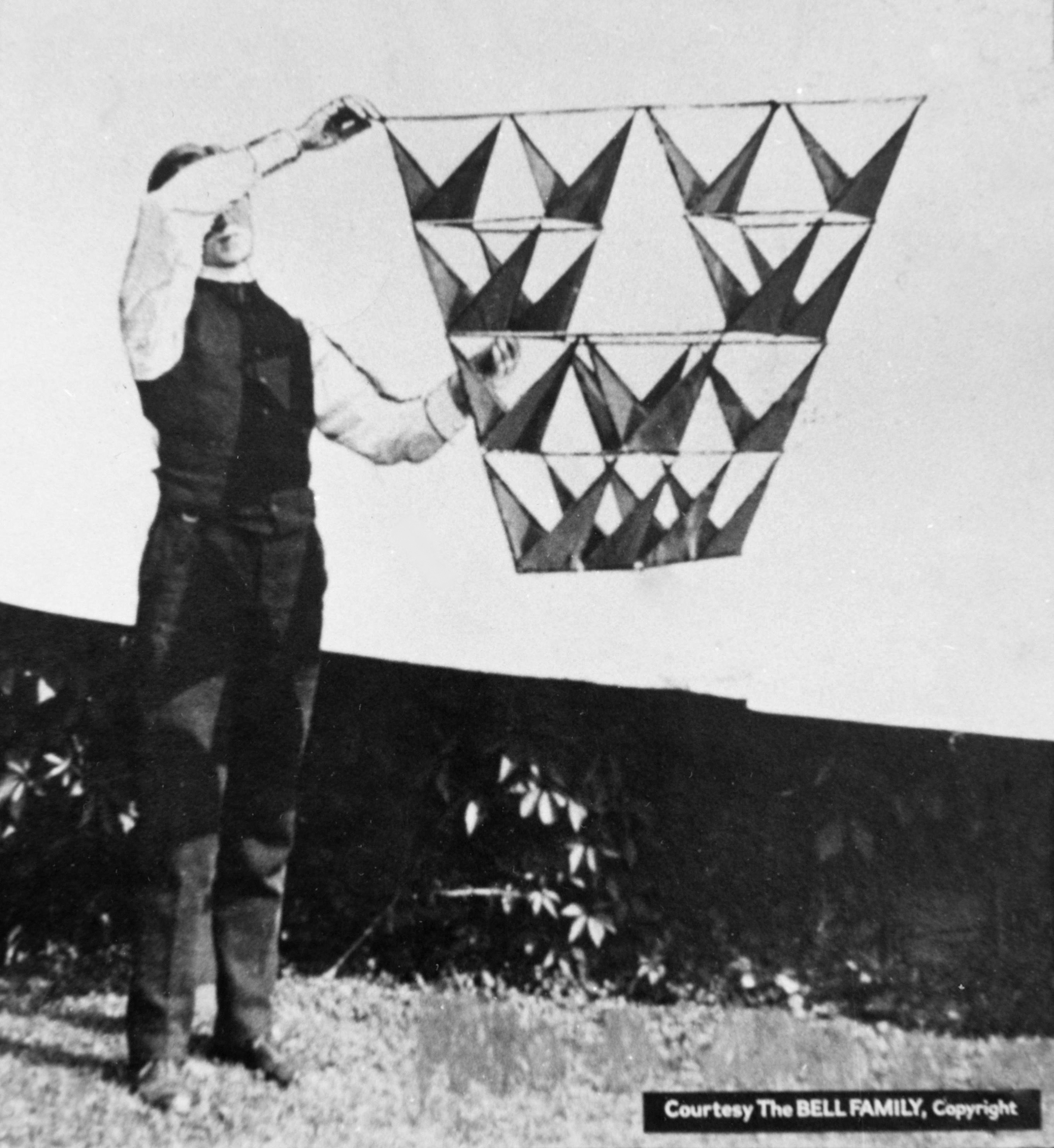
An early design of the tetrahedron kite from Alexander Graham Bell

This kite was invented by Alexander Graham Bell. It came about from his experiments with Hargrave's box kites and his attempts to build a kite that was scalable and big enough to carry both a man and a motor. As such, it was an early experiment on the road to manned flight. He worked on the kites between 1895 and 1910. Bell wrote about his discovery of this concept in the June 1903 issue of National Geographic magazine; the article was titled "Tetrahedral Principle in Kite Structure".

From an initial one-cell model, Bell advanced to a 3,393-cell "Cygnet" model in 1907. This 40-foot-long (12.2 m), 200-pound (91 kilogram) kite was towed by a steamer offshore near Baddeck, Nova Scotia, on December 6, 1907, and carried a man 168 feet (51.2 metres) above the water.

Bell also experimented with a large circular "tetrahedral truss" design during the same period.

The tetrahedral kite is stable and easy to fly, but is not a light-wind kite. The large number of structural spars makes it relatively heavy and it requires moderate to strong winds.

His patented tetrahedral principle (U.S. Patent 770,088) demonstrated the efficiency of space-filling, light-weight, and rigid structures and inspired the development of space frames used in architecture.

== See also ==
- Kite types
- Man-lifting kite
