= Josephine Scribner Gates =

American children's writer (1859–1930)

Josephine Scribner Gates (September 12, 1859 – August 22, 1930) was an American children's writer.

Josephine Scribner was born on September 12, 1859, in Mount Vernon, Ohio, to Mary E. (Morehouse) and Charles H. Scribner. She married Charles H. Gates on October 12, 1881.

She wrote an 11-book series about "live dolls", published between 1901 and 1912. A 1911 newspaper profile described Gates' writing as "a new literature for children which, perhaps, may be best described as modern fairy tales. They are better, by far, than any of the fairy tales which have come down to us through the ages, because there are no wicked fairies in them, no evil sprites of any kind, 'no nothing,' except naturalness and happiness".

The first book of the series, Story of the Live Dolls (1901), features Dinah, a caricature of the mammy stereotype of Black American women. Immediately after Dinah comes to life, she begins to act as a servant for the live white dolls as if by instinct. This conceit was common in American children's literature of the period.

Gates died on August 22, 1930, in Toledo, Ohio.

== Books ==
- The Live Dolls' Play Days (1909)
- The Story of the Mince Pie (1917)
- The Book of Live Dolls
