= Sled kite =

The sled kite was invented and patented by the American William Allison in the 1950s. This kite helped pave the way for a class of kites known as "semi-rigid."

Allison's kite has only vertical spars. The wind pressure curves the single sheet of material between the spars into a semicircle. The positioning of the two horizontal wingtip bridle attachments acts in the same manner as a vertical bridle on a structured kite, guiding the kite's attitude to the wind.

The delay in the issuing of the patent was due to the title “Flexible Kite”. The Patent Office's concern was that Allison's design might infringe on Rogallo's recently issued flexible wing patent.
