= Box kite =

Type of kite

Diagram of a box kite

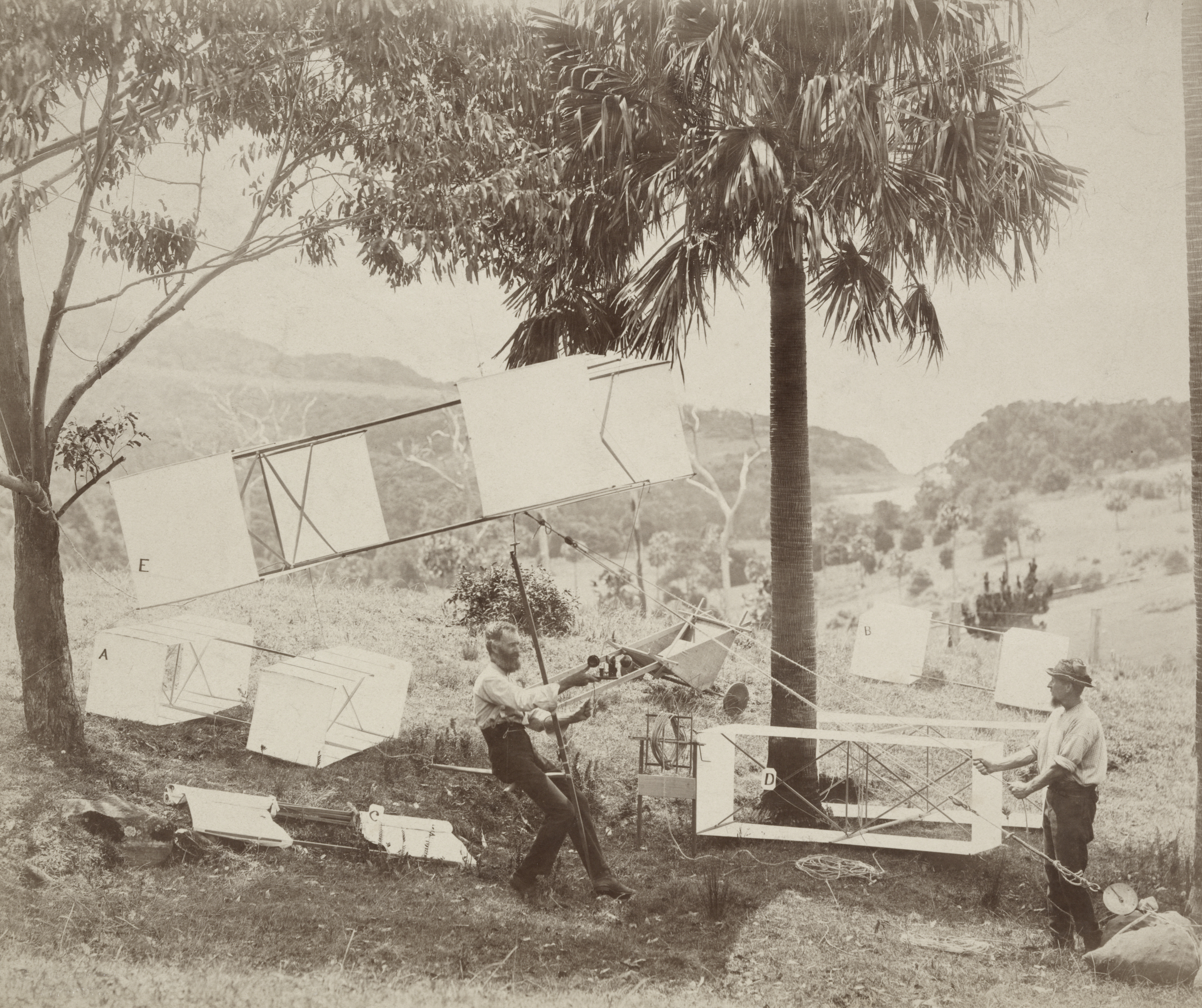
Hargrave (left) and Swain demonstrate the Hargrave box kite, November 1894. The skin is drum-tight, a consequence of the unique tensioning system devised by Hargrave. A collapsed kite, rolled up for transport, lies on the ground.

A box kite is a high-performance kite, noted for developing relatively high lift; it is a type within the family of cellular kites. The typical design has four parallel struts. The box is made rigid with diagonal crossed struts. There are two sails, or ribbons, whose width is about a quarter of the length of the box. The ribbons wrap around the ends of the box, leaving the ends and middle of the kite open. In flight, one strut is the bottom, and the bridle is tied between the top and bottom of this strut. The dihedrals of the sails help stability.

The box kite was invented in 1893 by Lawrence Hargrave, an English-born Australian, as part of his attempt to develop a manned flying machine. Hargrave linked several of his box kites (Hargrave cells) together, creating sufficient lift for him to fly some 16 ft (4.9 m) off the ground. A winged development of this kite is known as the Cody kite following its development by Samuel Franklin Cody. Military uses also involved a kite/radio transmitter combination issued to pilots during World War II for use in liferafts.

Large box kites are constructed as cellular kites. Rather than one box, there are many, each with its own set of sails.

Most of the altitude records for kite flying are held by large box kites, with Dacron sails, flown with Spectra cable. However in 2014 Robert Moore and a team of kite experts flew a 12 sq metre DT delta to 16,009 ft above their launch point. The location of the flights was near Cobar in Western NSW, Australia. While this was primarily a triangular winged delta kite, it has a triangular box centre cell for additional stability. Future attempts on either the single kite record or multiple kite record (trained), may use Hargrave box kites or a variant. Before Dacron, Spectra, and Kevlar were available, high performance box kites used oiled silk, linen or hemp sails, and were flown with steel cable. Silk, linen and hemp were used because they could be spun finer than cotton and stretched relatively little when wet. Steel had the highest available strength for its weight. After Hargrave invented the box kite, weather stations from around the world saw the potential for his design. Blue Hill Observatory and the German weather station at Lindenberg used kites routinely until weather balloons took over in the 1920s and 1930s.

== See also ==
- Kite
- Kite types
