= Fixed-wing aircraft =

Heavier-than-air aircraft with fixed wings generating aerodynamic lift

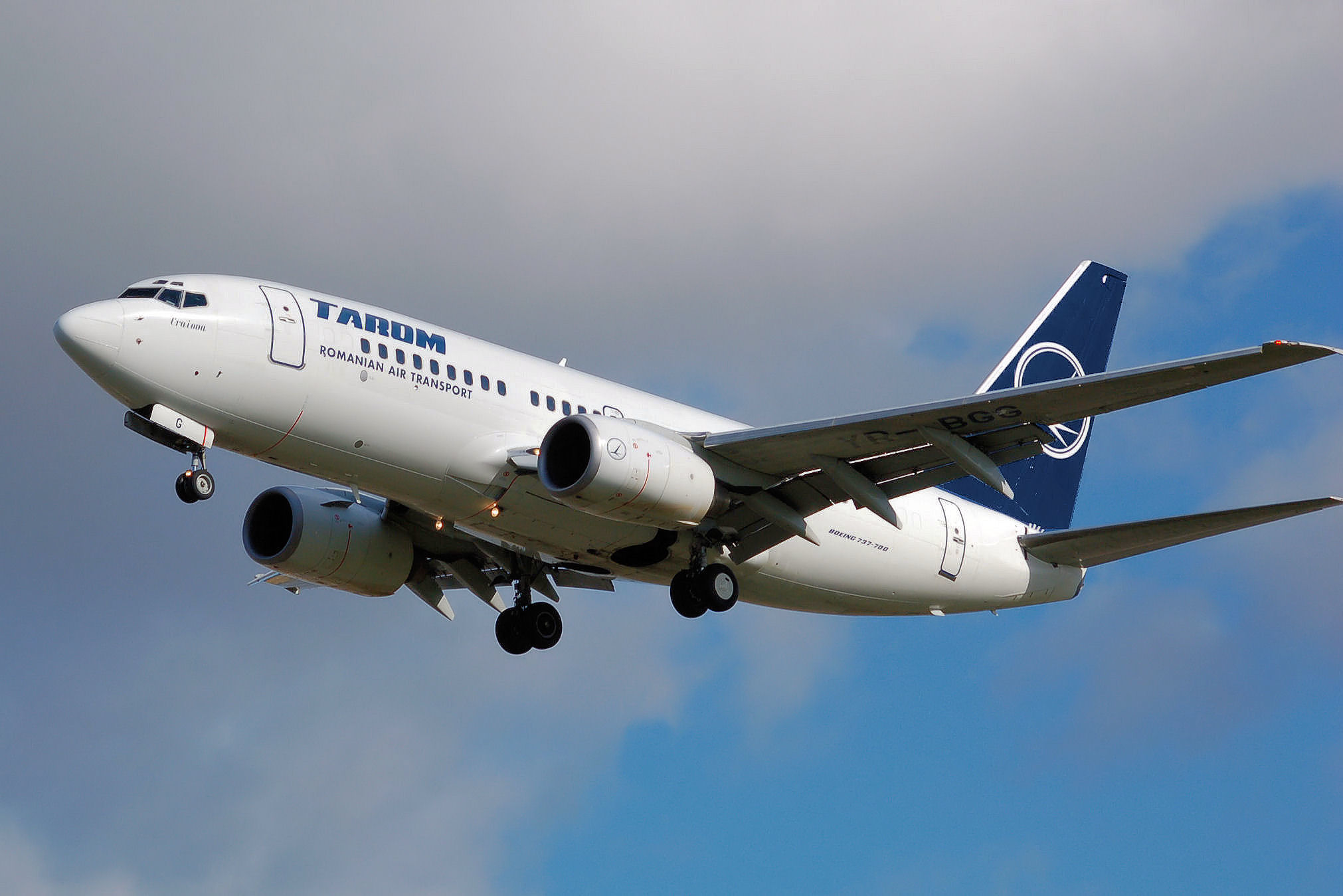
A Boeing 737 airliner is an example of a fixed-wing aircraft

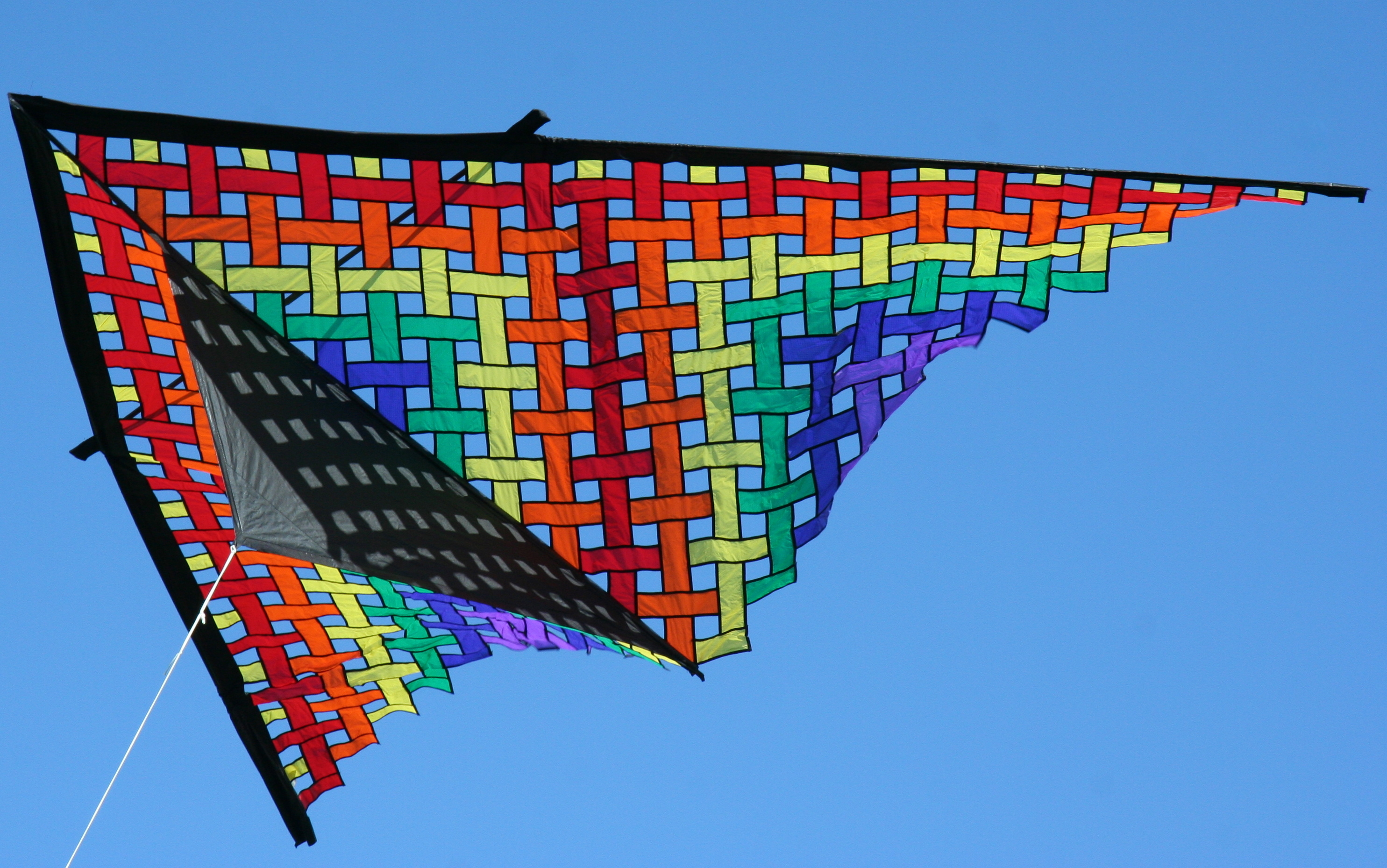
The fixed wings of a delta-shaped kite are not rigid

A fixed-wing aircraft is a heavier-than-air aircraft, such as an airplane, which is capable of flight using aerodynamic lift. Fixed-wing aircraft are distinct from rotary-wing aircraft (in which a rotor mounted on a spinning shaft generates lift), and ornithopters (in which the wings oscillate to generate lift). The wings of a fixed-wing aircraft are not necessarily rigid; kites, hang gliders, variable-sweep wing aircraft, and airplanes that use wing morphing are all classified as fixed wing.

Gliding fixed-wing aircraft, including free-flying gliders and tethered kites, can use moving air to gain altitude. Powered fixed-wing aircraft (airplanes) that gain forward thrust from an engine include powered paragliders, powered hang gliders and ground effect vehicles. Most fixed-wing aircraft are operated by a pilot, but some are controlled remotely or are completely autonomous (no remote pilot).

== History ==
=== Kites ===
Kites were used approximately 2,800 years ago in China, where kite building materials were available. Leaf kites may have been flown earlier in what is now Sulawesi, based on their interpretation of cave paintings on nearby Muna Island. By at least 549 AD paper kites were flying, as recorded that year, a paper kite was used as a message for a rescue mission. Ancient and medieval Chinese sources report kites used for measuring distances, testing the wind, lifting men, signaling, and communication for military operations.

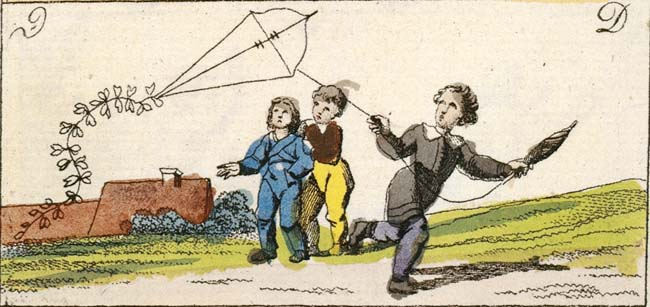
Children flying a kite in 1828 Bavaria, by Johann Michael Voltz

Kite stories were brought to Europe by Marco Polo towards the end of the 13th century, and kites were brought back by sailors from Japan and Malaysia in the 16th and 17th centuries. Although initially regarded as curiosities, by the 18th and 19th centuries kites were used for scientific research.

=== Gliders and powered devices ===
Around 400 BC in Greece, Archytas was reputed to have designed and built the first self-propelled flying device, shaped like a bird and propelled by a jet of what was probably steam, said to have flown some 200 m (660 ft). This machine may have been suspended during its flight.

One of the earliest attempts with gliders was by 11th-century monk Eilmer of Malmesbury, which failed. A 17th-century account states that 9th-century poet Abbas Ibn Firnas made a similar attempt, though no earlier sources record this event.

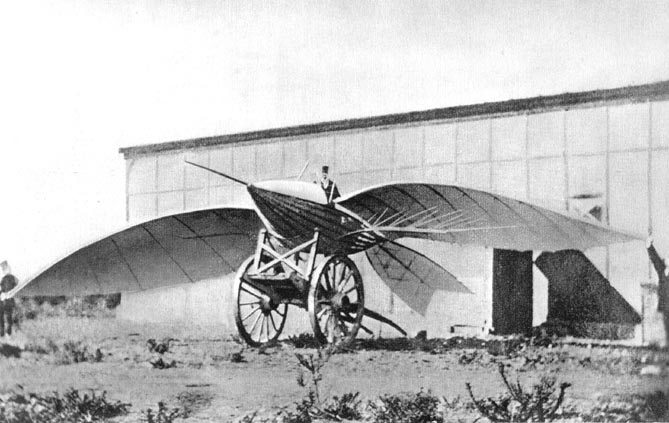
Le Bris and his glider, Albatros II, photographed by Nadar, 1868

In 1799, Sir George Cayley laid out the concept of the modern airplane as a fixed-wing machine with systems for lift, propulsion, and control. Cayley was building and flying models of fixed-wing aircraft as early as 1803, and built a successful passenger-carrying glider in 1853. In 1856, Frenchman Jean-Marie Le Bris made the first powered flight, had his glider L'Albatros artificiel towed by a horse along a beach. In 1884, American John J. Montgomery made controlled flights in a glider as a part of a series of gliders he built between 1883 and 1886. Other aviators who made similar flights at that time were Otto Lilienthal, Percy Pilcher, and protégés of Octave Chanute.

In the 1890s, Lawrence Hargrave conducted research on wing structures and developed a box kite that lifted the weight of a man. His designs were widely adopted. He also developed a type of rotary aircraft engine, but did not create a powered fixed-wing aircraft.

=== Powered flight ===
Sir Hiram Maxim built a craft that weighed 3.5 tons, with a 110-foot (34-meter) wingspan powered by two 360-horsepower (270-kW) steam engines driving two propellers. In 1894, his machine was tested with overhead rails to prevent it from rising. The test showed that it had enough lift to take off. The craft was uncontrollable, and Maxim abandoned work on it.

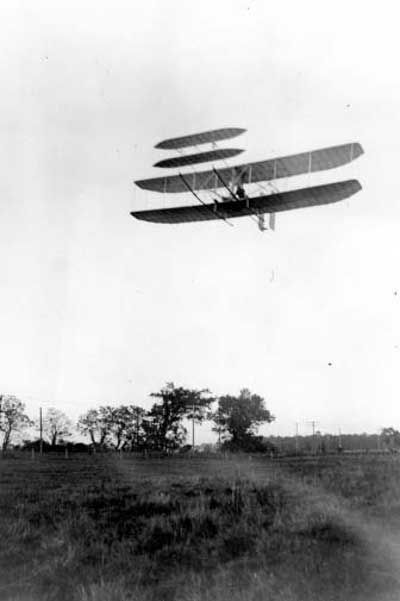
Wright Flyer III piloted by Orville Wright over Huffman Prairie, 4 October 1905

The Wright brothers' flights in 1903 with their Flyer I are recognized by the Fédération Aéronautique Internationale (FAI), the standard setting and record-keeping body for aeronautics, as "the first sustained and controlled heavier-than-air powered flight". By 1905, the Wright Flyer III was capable of fully controllable, stable flight for substantial periods.

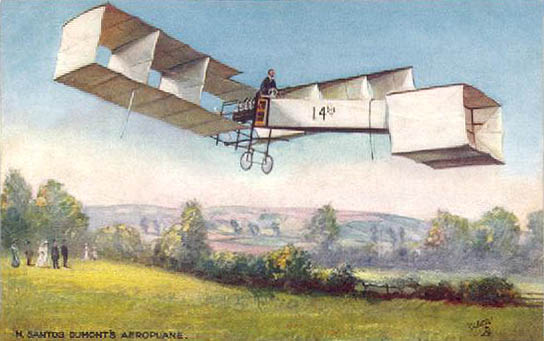
Santos-Dumont's self-propelled 14-bis on an old postcard

In 1906, Brazilian inventor Alberto Santos Dumont designed, built and piloted an aircraft that set the first world record recognized by the Aéro-Club de France by flying the 14 bis 220 metres (720 ft) in less than 22 seconds. The flight was certified by the FAI.

The Bleriot VIII design of 1908 was an early aircraft design that had the modern monoplane tractor configuration. It had movable tail surfaces controlling both yaw and pitch, a form of roll control supplied either by wing warping or by ailerons and controlled by its pilot with a joystick and rudder bar. It was an important predecessor of his later Bleriot XI Channel-crossing aircraft of the summer of 1909.

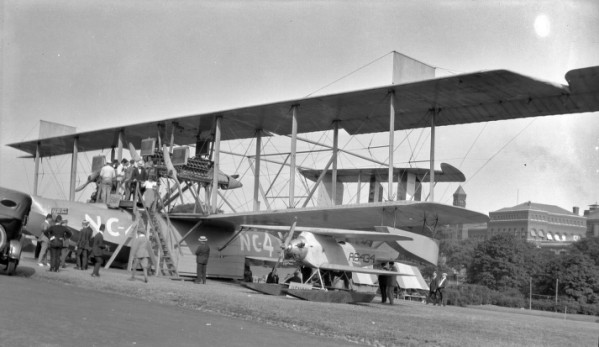
Curtiss NC-4 flying boat after it completed the first crossing of the Atlantic in 1919, standing next to a fixed-wing heavier-than-air aircraft

=== World War I ===
World War I served initiated the use of aircraft as weapons and observation platforms. The earliest known aerial victory with a synchronized machine gun-armed fighter aircraft occurred in 1915, flown by German Luftstreitkräfte Lieutenant Kurt Wintgens. Fighter aces appeared; the greatest (by number of air victories) was Manfred von Richthofen.

Alcock and Brown crossed the Atlantic non-stop for the first time in 1919. The first commercial flights traveled between the United States and Canada in 1919.

=== Interwar aviation; the "Golden Age" ===
The so-called Golden Age of Aviation occurred between the two World Wars, during which updated interpretations of earlier breakthroughs. Innovations include Hugo Junkers' all-metal air frames in 1915 leading to multi-engine aircraft of up to 60+ meter wingspan sizes by the early 1930s, adoption of the mostly air-cooled radial engine as a practical aircraft power plant alongside V-12 liquid-cooled aviation engines, and longer and longer flights – as with a Vickers Vimy in 1919, followed months later by the U.S. Navy's NC-4 transatlantic flight; culminating in May 1927 with Charles Lindbergh's solo trans-Atlantic flight in the Spirit of St. Louis spurring ever-longer flight attempts.

=== World War II ===
Airplanes had a presence in the major battles of World War II. They were an essential component of military strategies, such as the German Blitzkrieg or the American and Japanese aircraft carrier campaigns of the Pacific.

Military gliders were developed and used in several campaigns, but were limited by the high casualty rate encountered. The Focke-Achgelis Fa 330 Bachstelze (Wagtail) rotor kite of 1942 was notable for its use by German U-boats.

Before and during the war, British and German designers worked on jet engines. The first jet aircraft to fly, in 1939, was the German Heinkel He 178. In 1943, the first operational jet fighter, the Messerschmitt Me 262, went into service with the German Luftwaffe. Later in the war the British Gloster Meteor entered service, but never saw action – top air speeds for that era went as high as 1,130 km/h (700 mph), with the early July 1944 unofficial record flight of the German Me 163B V18 rocket fighter prototype.

=== Postwar ===
In October 1947, the Bell X-1 was the first aircraft to exceed the speed of sound, flown by Chuck Yeager.

In 1948–49, aircraft transported supplies during the Berlin Blockade. New aircraft types, such as the B-52, were produced during the Cold War.

The first jet airliner, the de Havilland Comet, was introduced in 1952, followed by the Soviet Tupolev Tu-104 in 1956. The Boeing 707, the first widely successful commercial jet, was in commercial service for more than 50 years, from 1958 to 2010. The Boeing 747 was the world's largest passenger aircraft from 1970 until it was surpassed by the Airbus A380 in 2005. The most successful aircraft is the Douglas DC-3 and its military version, the C-47, a medium-sized twin engine passenger or transport aircraft that has been in service since 1936 and is still used throughout the world. Some of the hundreds of versions found other purposes, like the AC-47, a Vietnam War era gunship, which is still used in the Colombian Air Force.

== Types ==
=== Airplane/aeroplane ===
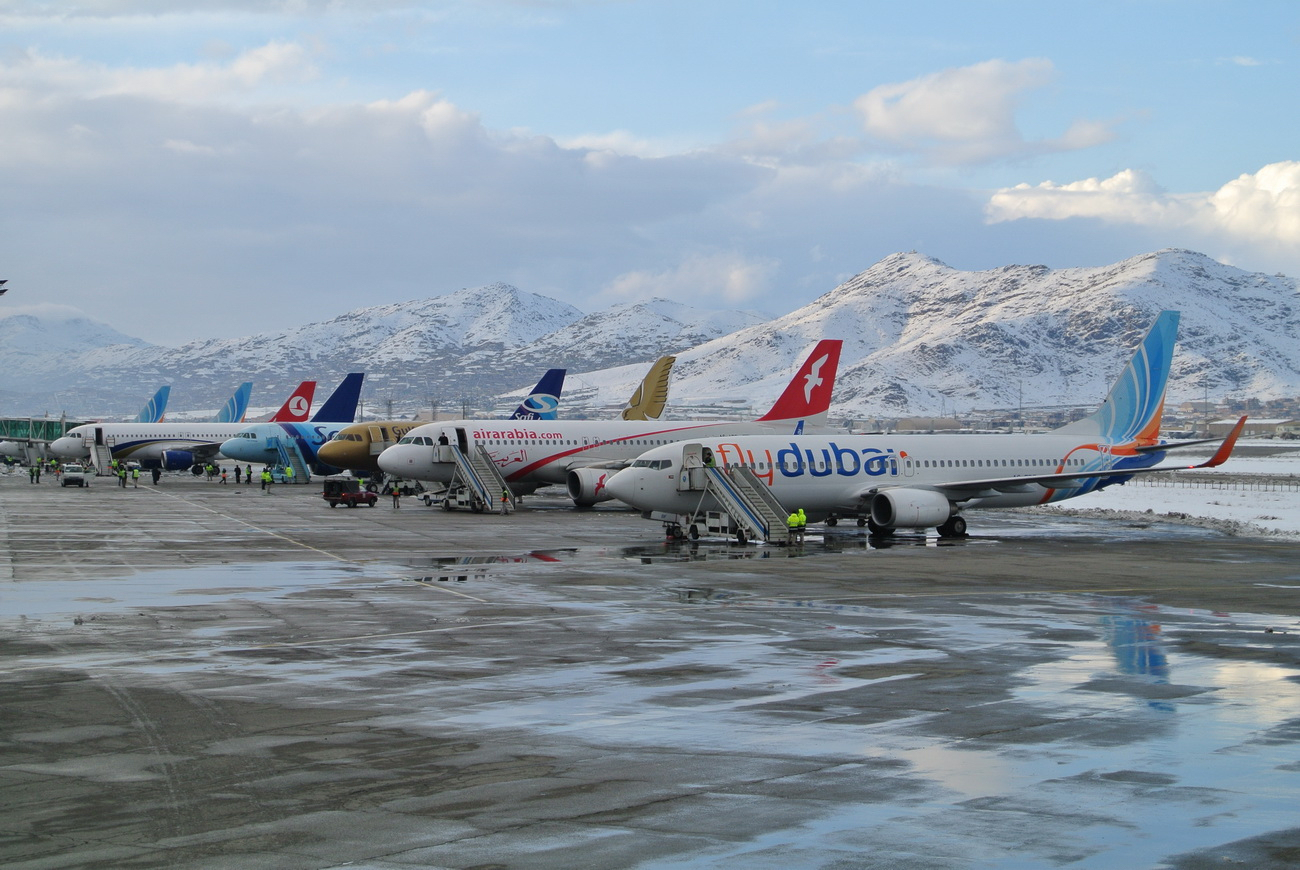
Aircraft parked on the ground in Afghanistan

An airplane (spelled aeroplane in British English and shortened to plane) is a powered fixed-wing aircraft propelled by thrust from a jet engine or propeller. Planes come in many sizes, shapes, and wing configurations. Uses include recreation, transportation of goods and people, military, and research.

==== Seaplane ====
A seaplane (hydroplane) is capable of taking off and landing (alighting) on water. Seaplanes that can also operate from dry land are a subclass called amphibian aircraft. Seaplanes and amphibians divide into two categories: float planes and flying boats.

- A float plane is similar to a land-based airplane. The fuselage is not specialized. The wheels are replaced/enveloped by floats, allowing the craft to make remain afloat for water landings.
- A flying boat is a seaplane with a watertight hull for the lower (ventral) areas of its fuselage. The fuselage lands and then rests directly on the water's surface, held afloat by the hull. It does not need additional floats for buoyancy, although small underwing floats or fuselage-mounted sponsons may be used to stabilize it. Large seaplanes are usually flying boats, embodying most classic amphibian aircraft designs.

==== Powered gliders ====
Many forms of glider may include a small power plant. These include:

- Motor glider – a conventional glider or sailplane with an auxiliary power plant that may be used when in flight to increase performance.
- Powered hang glider – a hang glider with a power plant added.
- Powered parachute – a paraglider type of parachute with an integrated air frame, seat, undercarriage and power plant hung beneath.
- Powered paraglider or paramotor – a paraglider with a power plant suspended behind the pilot.

==== Ground effect vehicle ====
A ground effect vehicle (GEV) flies close to the terrain, making use of the ground effect – the interaction between the wings and the surface. Some GEVs are able to fly higher out of ground effect (OGE) when required – these are classed as powered fixed-wing aircraft.

=== Glider ===
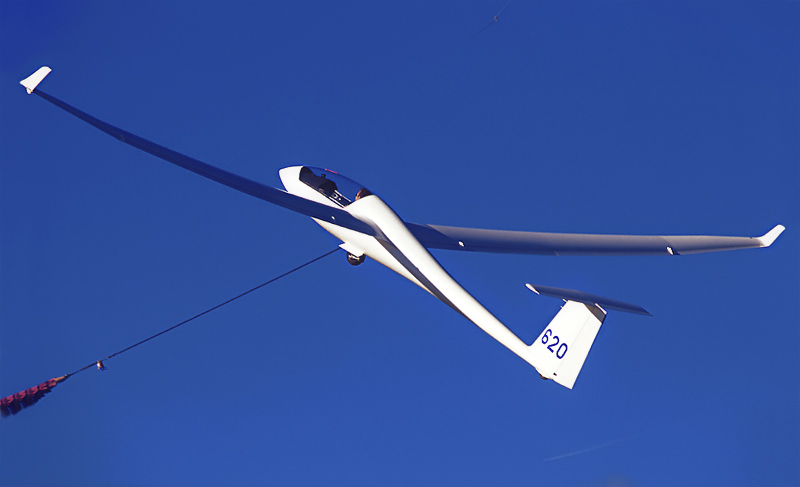
A glider (sailplane) being winch-launched

A glider is a heavier-than-air craft whose free flight does not require an engine. A sailplane is a fixed-wing glider designed for soaring – gaining height using updrafts of air and to fly for long periods.

Gliders are mainly used for recreation but have found use for purposes such as aerodynamics research, warfare and spacecraft recovery.

Motor gliders are equipped with a limited propulsion system for takeoff, or to extend flight duration.

As is the case with planes, gliders come in diverse forms with varied wings, aerodynamic efficiency, pilot location, and controls.

Large gliders are most commonly born aloft by a tow-plane or by a winch. Military gliders have been used in combat to deliver troops and equipment, while specialized gliders have been used in atmospheric and aerodynamic research. Rocket-powered aircraft and spaceplanes have made unpowered landings similar to a glider.

Gliders and sailplanes that are used for the sport of gliding have high aerodynamic efficiency. The highest lift-to-drag ratio is 70:1, though 50:1 is common. After take-off, further altitude can be gained through the skillful exploitation of rising air. Flights of thousands of kilometers at average speeds over 200 km/h have been achieved.

One small-scale example of a glider is the paper airplane. An ordinary sheet of paper can be folded into an aerodynamic shape fairly easily; its low mass relative to its surface area reduces the required lift for flight, allowing it to glide some distance.

Gliders and sailplanes share many design elements and aerodynamic principles with powered aircraft. For example, the Horten H.IV was a tailless flying wing glider, and the delta-winged Space Shuttle orbiter glided during its descent phase. Many gliders adopt similar control surfaces and instruments as airplanes.

==== Types ====
Video clip of a glider sailing over Gunma Prefecture, Japan

The main application of modern glider aircraft is sport and recreation.

===== Sailplane =====
Gliders were developed in the 1920s for recreational purposes. As pilots began to understand how to use rising air, sailplane gliders were developed with a high lift-to-drag ratio. These allowed the craft to glide to the next source of "lift", increasing their range. This gave rise to the popular sport of gliding.

Early gliders were built mainly of wood and metal, later replaced by composite materials incorporating glass, carbon or aramid fibers. To minimize drag, these types have a streamlined fuselage and long narrow wings incorporating a high aspect ratio. Single-seat and two-seat gliders are available.

Initially, training was done by short "hops" in primary gliders, which have no cockpit and minimal instruments. Since shortly after World War II, training is done in two-seat dual control gliders, but high-performance two-seaters can make long flights. Originally skids were used for landing, later replaced by wheels, often retractable. Gliders known as motor gliders are designed for unpowered flight, but can deploy piston, rotary, jet or electric engines. Gliders are classified by the FAI for competitions into glider competition classes mainly on the basis of wingspan and flaps.

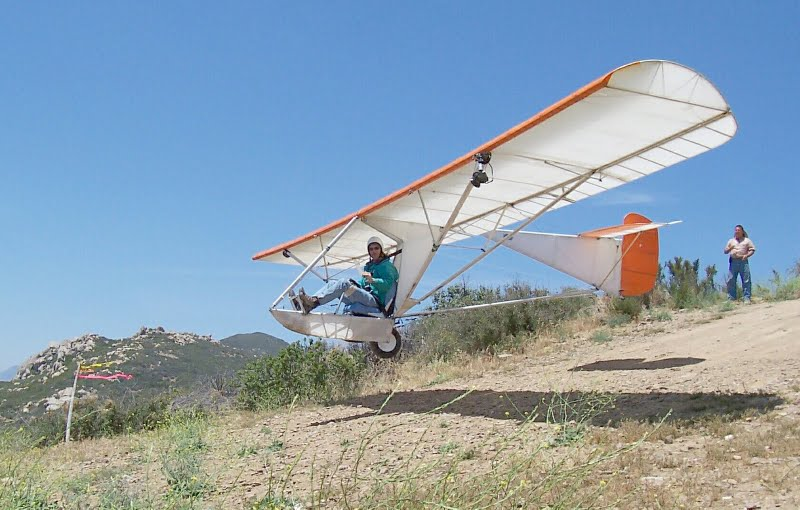
Ultralight "airchair" Goat 1 glider

A class of ultralight sailplanes, including some known as microlift gliders and some known as airchairs, has been defined by the FAI based on weight. They are light enough to be transported easily, and can be flown without licensing in some countries. Ultralight gliders have performance similar to hang gliders, but offer some crash safety as the pilot can strap into an upright seat within a deform-able structure. Landing is usually on one or two wheels which distinguishes these craft from hang gliders. Most are built by individual designers and hobbyists.

===== Military gliders =====
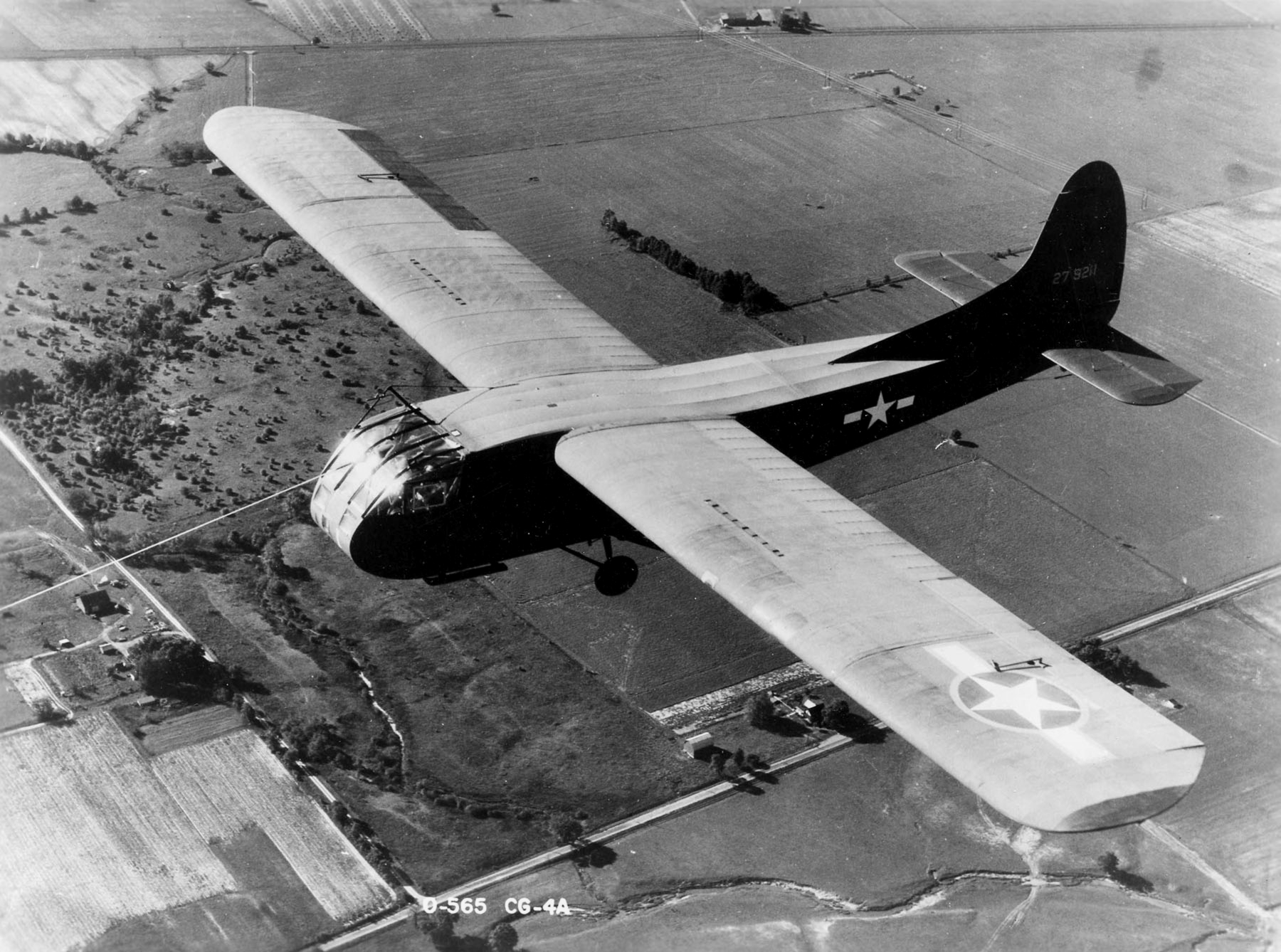
A 1943 USAAF Waco CG-4A

Military gliders were used during World War II for carrying troops (glider infantry) and heavy equipment to combat zones. The gliders were towed into the air and most of the way to their target by transport planes, e.g. C-47 Dakota, or by one-time bombers that had been relegated to secondary activities, e.g. Short Stirling. The advantage over paratroopers were that heavy equipment could be landed and that troops were quickly assembled rather than dispersed over a parachute drop zone. The gliders were treated as disposable, constructed from inexpensive materials such as wood, though a few were re-used. By the time of the Korean War, transport aircraft had become larger and more efficient so that even light tanks could be dropped by parachute, obsoleting gliders.

===== Research gliders =====
Even after the development of powered aircraft, gliders continued to be used for aviation research. The NASA Paresev Rogallo flexible wing was developed to investigate alternative methods of recovering spacecraft. Although this application was abandoned, publicity inspired hobbyists to adapt the flexible-wing airfoil for hang gliders.

Initial research into many types of fixed-wing craft, including flying wings and lifting bodies was also carried out using unpowered prototypes.

===== Hang glider =====
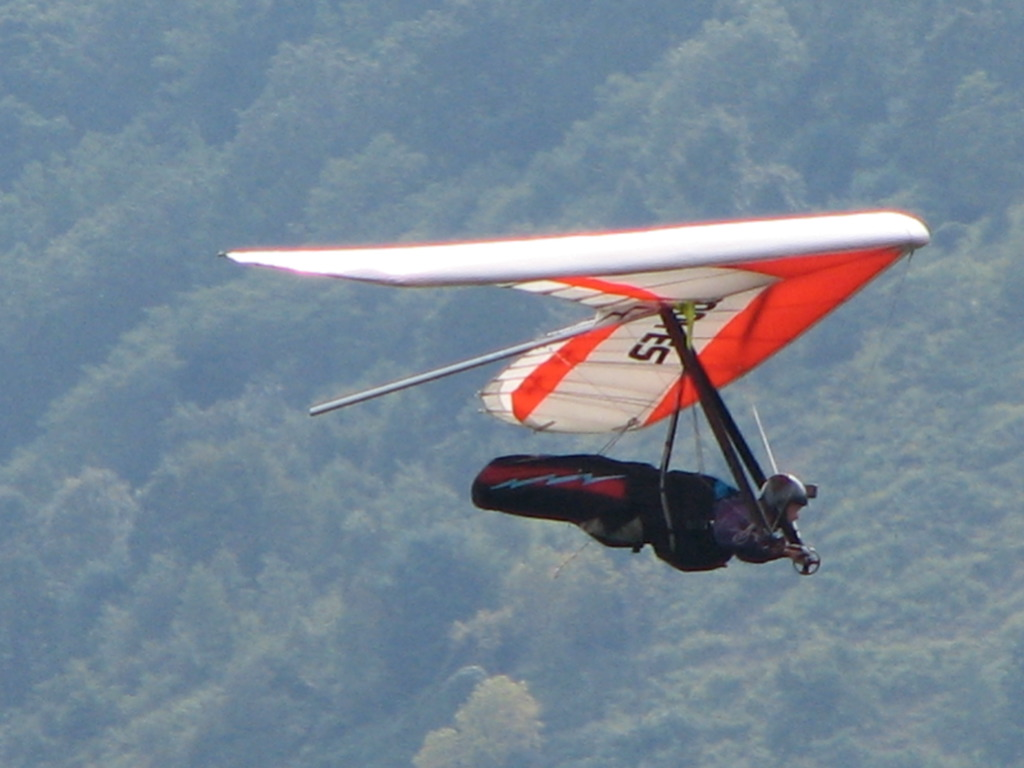
Hang gliding

A hang glider is a glider aircraft in which the pilot is suspended in a harness suspended from the air frame, and exercises control by shifting body weight in opposition to a control frame. Hang gliders are typically made of an aluminum alloy or composite-framed fabric wing. Pilots can soar for hours, gain thousands of meters of altitude in thermal updrafts, perform aerobatics, and glide cross-country for hundreds of kilometers.

===== Paraglider =====
A paraglider is a lightweight, free-flying, foot-launched glider with no rigid body. The pilot is suspended in a harness below a hollow fabric wing whose shape is formed by its suspension lines. Air entering vents in the front of the wing and the aerodynamic forces of the air flowing over the outside power the craft. Paragliding is most often a recreational activity.

==== Unmanned gliders ====
A paper plane is a toy aircraft (usually a glider) made out of paper or paperboard.

Model glider aircraft are models of aircraft using lightweight materials such as polystyrene and balsa wood. Designs range from simple glider aircraft to accurate scale models, some of which can be very large.

Glide bombs are bombs with aerodynamic surfaces to allow a gliding flight path rather than a ballistic one. This enables stand-off aircraft to attack a target from a distance.

=== Kite ===
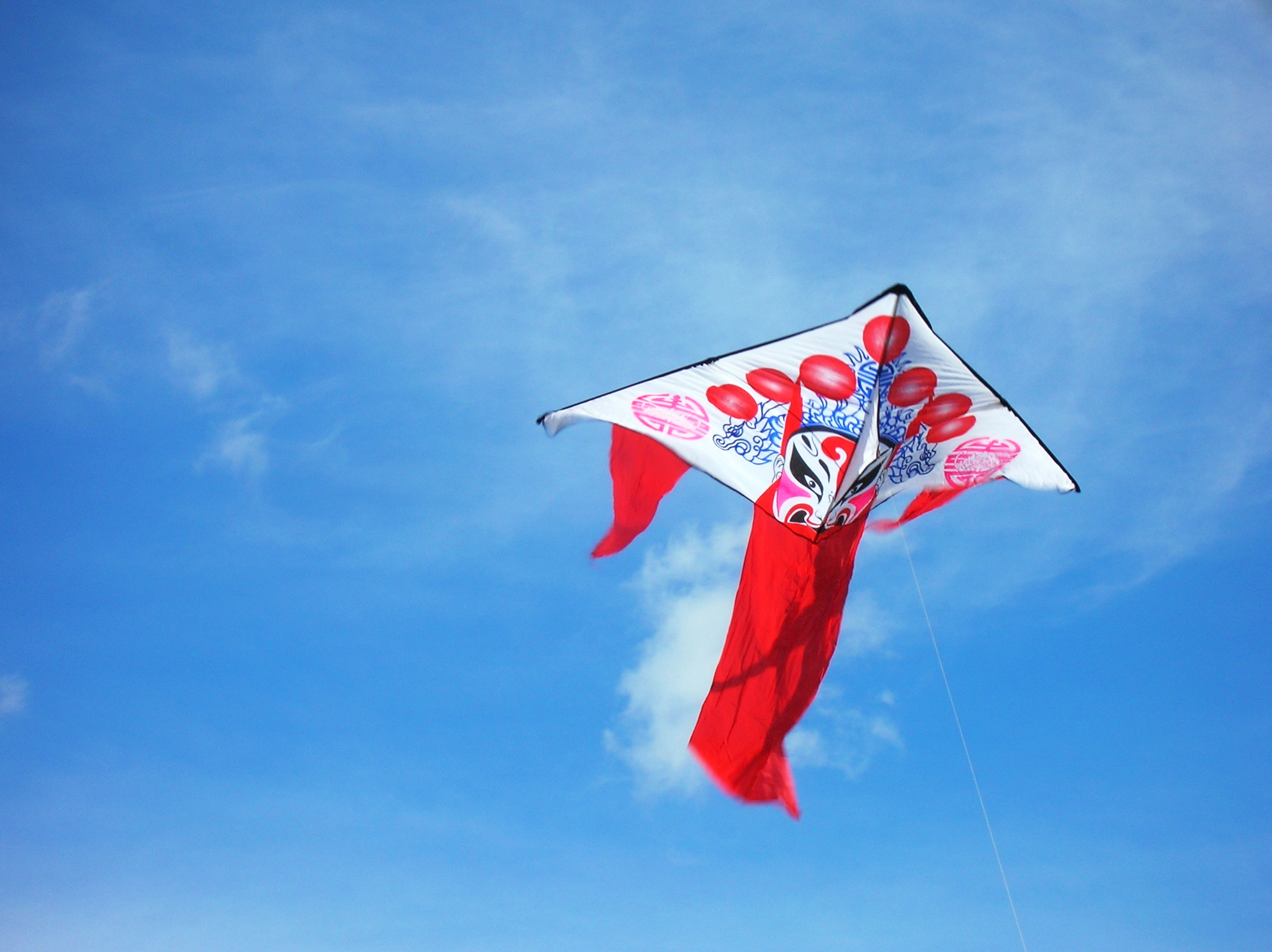
A kite in flight

A kite is a tethered aircraft held aloft by wind that blows over its wing(s). High pressure below the wing deflects the airflow downwards. This deflection generates horizontal drag in the direction of the wind. The resultant force vector from the lift and drag force components is opposed by the tension of the tether.

Kites are mostly flown for recreational purposes, but have many other uses. Early pioneers such as the Wright brothers and J.W. Dunne sometimes flew an aircraft as a kite in order to confirm its flight characteristics, before adding an engine and flight controls.

==== Applications ====
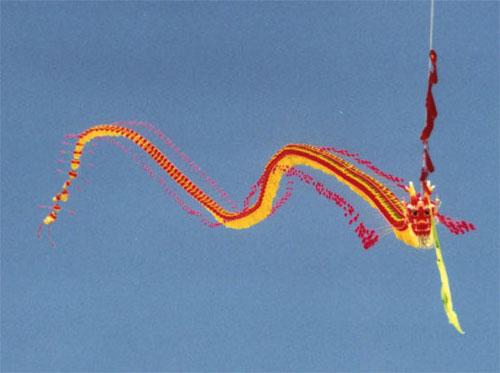
Chinese dragon kite more than one hundred feet long which flew in the Berkeley, California, kite festival in 2000

===== Military =====
Kites have been used for signaling, for delivery of munitions, and for observation, by lifting an observer above the field of battle, and by using kite aerial photography.

===== Science and meteorology =====
Kites have been used for scientific purposes, such as Benjamin Franklin's famous experiment proving that lightning is electricity. Kites were the precursors to the traditional aircraft, and were instrumental in the development of early flying craft. Alexander Graham Bell experimented with large man-lifting kites, as did the Wright brothers and Lawrence Hargrave. Kites had a historical role in lifting scientific instruments to measure atmospheric conditions for weather forecasting.

===== Radio aerials and light beacons =====
Kites can be used to carry radio antennas. This method was used for the reception station of the first transatlantic transmission by Marconi. Captive balloons may be more convenient for such experiments, because kite-carried antennas require strong wind, which may be not always available with heavy equipment and a ground conductor.

Kites can be used to carry light sources such as light sticks or battery-powered lights.

===== Kite traction =====
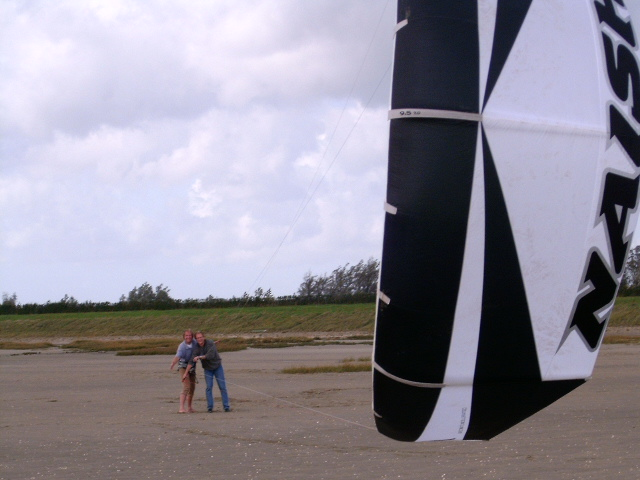
A quad-line traction kite, commonly used as a power source for kite surfing

Kites can be used to pull people and vehicles downwind. Efficient foil-type kites such as power kites can also be used to sail upwind under the same principles as used by other sailing craft, provided that lateral forces on the ground or in the water are redirected as with the keels, center boards, wheels and ice blades of traditional sailing craft. In the last two decades, kite sailing sports have become popular, such as kite buggying, kite landboarding, kite boating and kite surfing. Snow kiting is also popular.

Kite sailing opens several possibilities not available in traditional sailing:

- Wind speeds are greater at higher altitudes
- Kites may be maneuvered dynamically, which dramatically increases the available force
- Mechanical structures are not needed to withstand bending forces; vehicles/hulls can be light or eliminated.

===== Power generation =====
Research and development projects investigate kites for harnessing high altitude wind currents for electricity generation.

===== Cultural uses =====
Kite festivals are a popular form of entertainment throughout the world. They include local events, traditional festivals and major international festivals.

==== Designs ====
Train of connected kites

- Bermuda kite
- Bowed kite, e.g. Rokkaku
- Cellular or box kite
- Chapi-chapi
- Delta kite
- Foil, parafoil or bow kite
- Malay kite see also wau bulan
- Tetrahedral kite

==== Types ====
- Expanded polystyrene kite
- Fighter kite
- Indoor kite
- Inflatable single-line kite
- Kytoon
- Man-lifting kite
- Rogallo parawing kite
- Stunt (sport) kite
- Water kite

== Characteristics ==
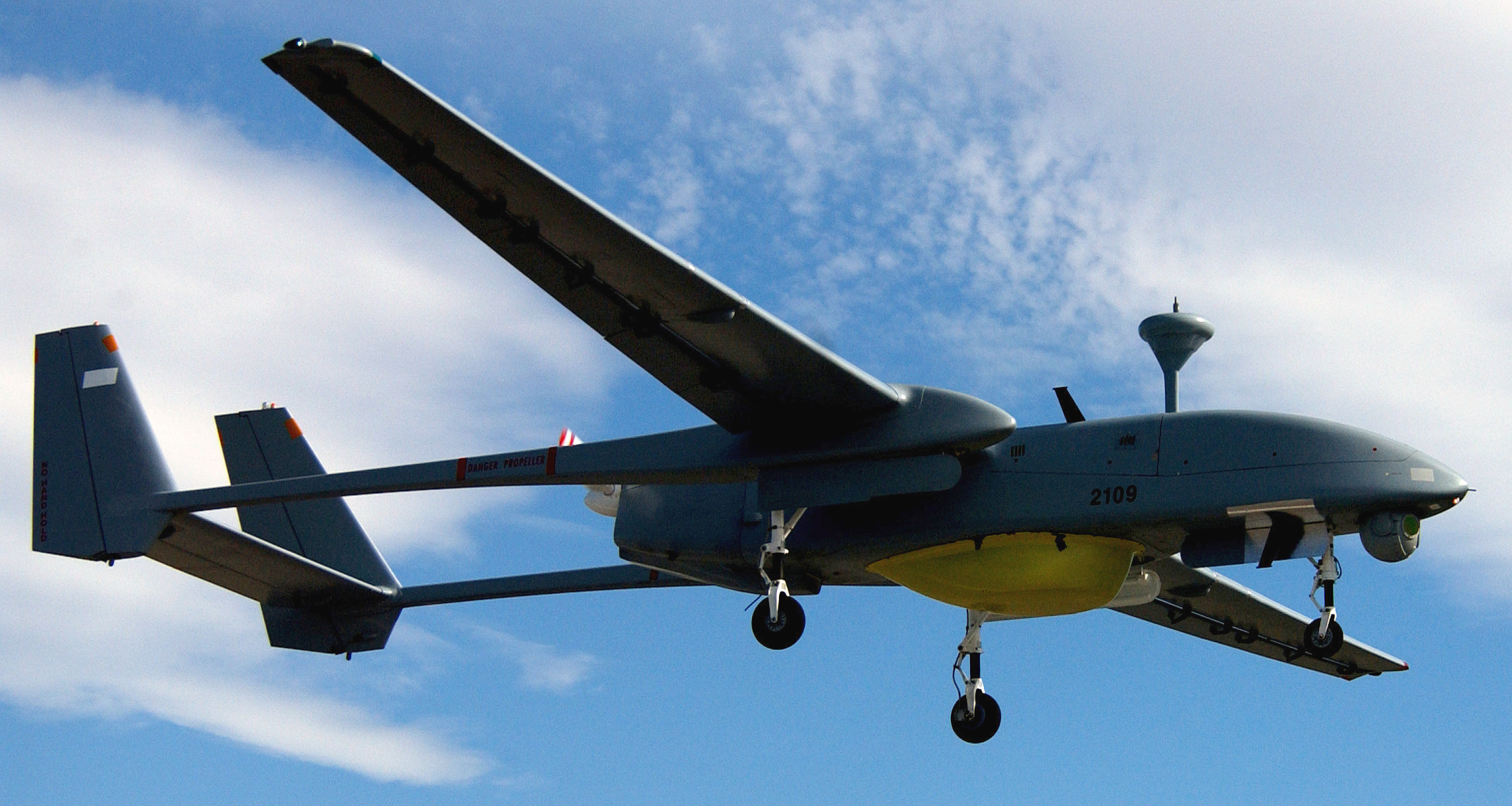
The IAI Heron is an unmanned aerial vehicle (UAV) with a twin-boom configuration

=== Air frame ===
The structural element of a fixed-wing aircraft is the air frame. It varies according to the aircraft's type, purpose, and technology. Early airframes were made of wood with fabric wing surfaces, When engines became available for powered flight, their mounts were made of metal. As speeds increased metal became more common until by the end of World War II, all-metal (and glass) aircraft were common. In modern times, composite materials became more common.

Typical structural elements include:

- One or more mostly horizontal wings, often with an airfoil cross-section. The wing deflects air downward as the aircraft moves forward, generating lifting force to support it in flight. The wing also provides lateral stability to stop the aircraft level in steady flight. Other roles are to hold the fuel and mount the engines.
- A fuselage, typically a long, thin body, usually with tapered or rounded ends to make its shape aerodynamically slippery. The fuselage joins the other parts of the air frame and contains the payload, and flight systems.
- A vertical stabilizer or fin is a rigid surface mounted at the rear of the plane and typically protruding above it. The fin stabilizes the plane's yaw (turn left or right) and mounts the rudder which controls its rotation along that axis.
- A horizontal stabilizer, usually mounted at the tail near the vertical stabilizer. The horizontal stabilizer is used to stabilize the plane's pitch (tilt up or down) and mounts the elevators that provide pitch control.
- Landing gear, a set of wheels, skids, or floats that support the plane while it is not in flight. On seaplanes, the bottom of the fuselage or floats (pontoons) support it while on the water. On some planes, the landing gear retracts during the flight to reduce drag.
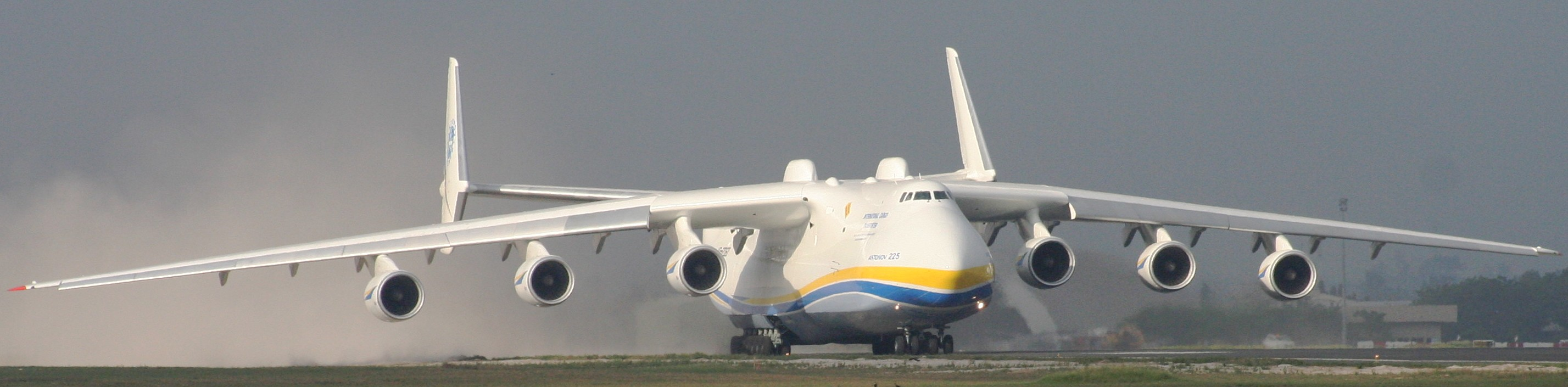
The An-225 Mriya, which was the largest airplane in the world, could carry a 250-tonne payload, had two vertical stabilizers.

=== Wings ===
The wings of a fixed-wing aircraft are static planes extending to either side of the aircraft. When the aircraft travels forwards, air flows over the wings that are shaped to create lift.

==== Structure ====
Kites and some lightweight gliders and airplanes have flexible wing surfaces that are stretched across a frame and made rigid by the lift forces exerted by the airflow over them. Larger aircraft have rigid wing surfaces.

Whether flexible or rigid, most wings have a strong frame to give them shape and to transfer lift from the wing surface to the rest of the aircraft. The main structural elements are one or more spars running from root to tip, and ribs running from the leading (front) to the trailing (rear) edge.

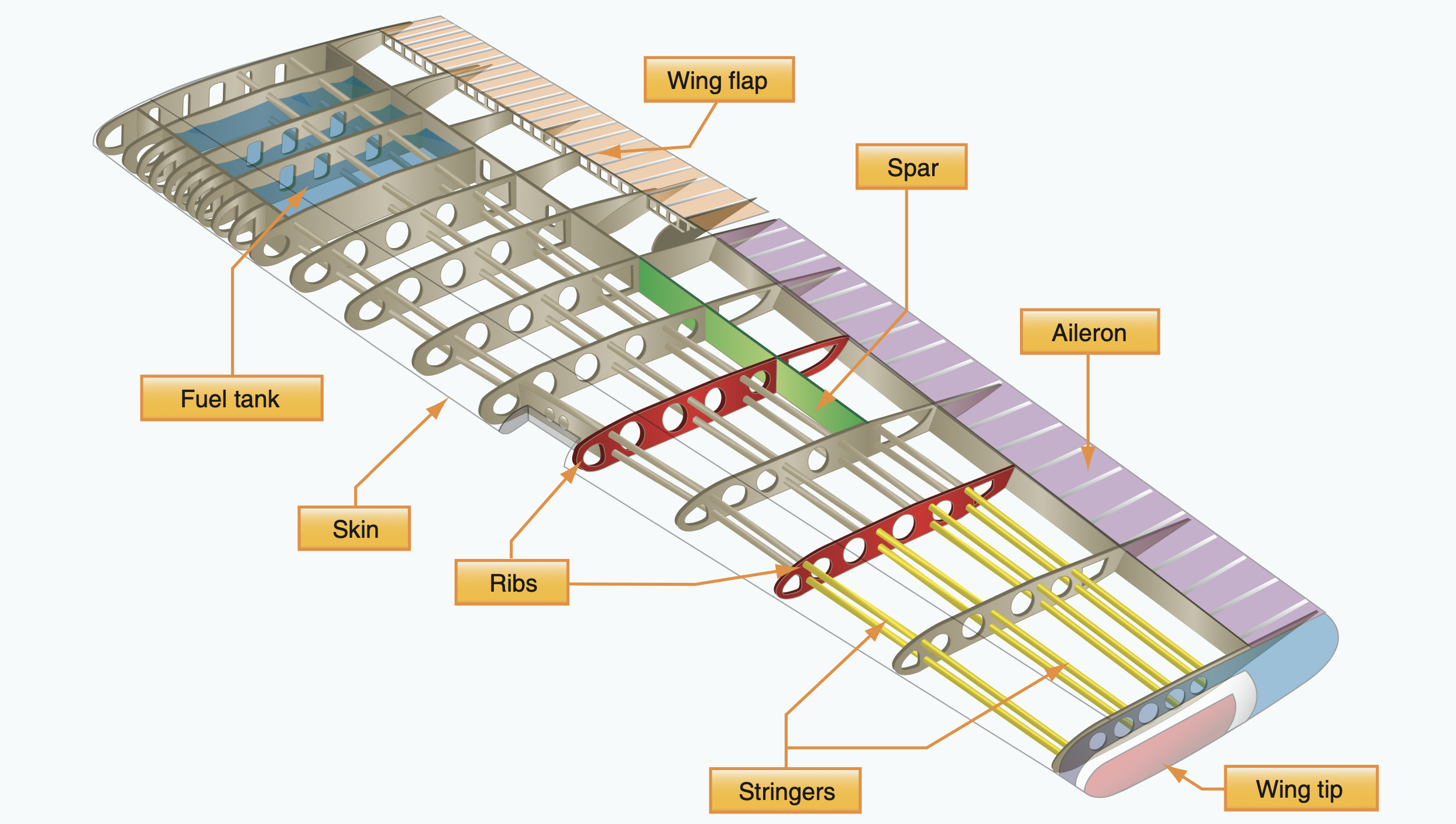
Major components of a rigid wing.

Early airplane engines had little power and light weight was critical. Also, early airfoil sections were thin, and could not support a strong frame. Until the 1930s, most wings were so fragile that external bracing struts and wires were added. As engine power increased, wings could be made heavy and strong enough that bracing was unnecessary. Such an unbraced wing is called a cantilever wing.

==== Configuration ====
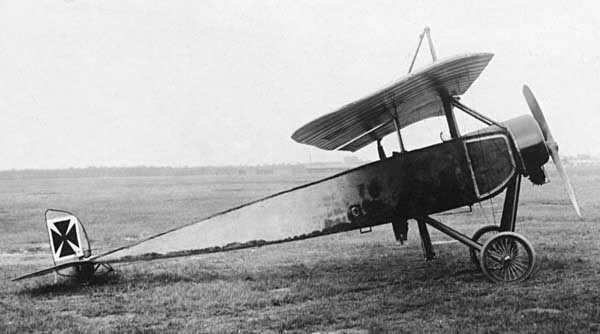
Captured Morane-Saulnier L wire-braced parasol monoplane

The number and shape of wings vary widely. Some designs blend the wing with the fuselage, while left and right wings separated by the fuselage are more common.

Occasionally more wings have been used, such as the three-winged triplane from World War I. Four-winged quadruplanes and other multiplane designs have had little success.

Most planes are monoplanes, with one or two parallel wings. Biplanes and triplanes stack one wing above the other. Tandem wings place one wing behind the other, possibly joined at the tips. When the available engine power increased during the 1920s and 1930s and bracing was no longer needed, the unbraced or cantilever monoplane became the most common form.

The planform is the shape when seen from above/below. To be aerodynamically efficient, wings are straight with a long span, but a short chord (high aspect ratio). To be structurally efficient, and hence lightweight, wingspan must be as small as possible, but offer enough area to provide lift.

To travel at transonic speeds, variable geometry wings change orientation, angling backward to reduce drag from supersonic shock waves. The variable-sweep wing transforms between an efficient straight configuration for takeoff and landing, to a low-drag swept configuration for high-speed flight. Other forms of variable planform have been flown, but none have gone beyond the research stage. The swept wing is a straight wing swept backward or forwards.

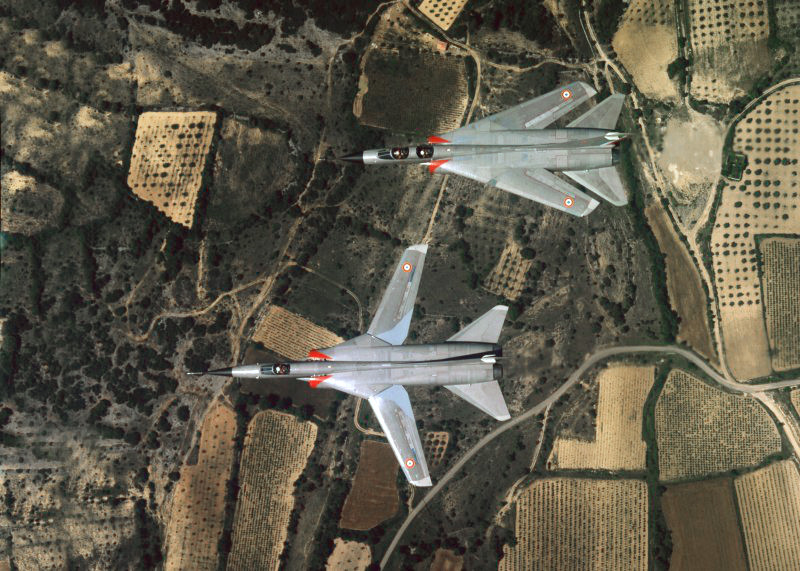
Two Dassault Mirage G prototypes, one with wings swept (top)

The delta wing is a triangular shape that serves various purposes. As a flexible Rogallo wing, it allows a stable shape under aerodynamic forces, and is often used for kites and other ultralight craft. It is supersonic capable, combining high strength with low drag.

Wings are typically hollow, also serving as fuel tanks. They are equipped with flaps, which allow the wing to increase/decrease drag/lift, for take-off and landing, and acting in opposition, to change direction.

=== Fuselage ===
The fuselage is typically long and thin, usually with tapered or rounded ends to make its shape aerodynamically smooth. Most fixed-wing aircraft have a single fuselage. Others may have multiple fuselages, or the fuselage may be fitted with booms on either side of the tail to allow the extreme rear of the fuselage to be utilized.

The fuselage typically carries the flight crew, passengers, cargo, and sometimes fuel and engine(s). Gliders typically omit fuel and engines, although some variations such as motor gliders and rocket gliders have them for temporary or optional use.

Pilots of manned commercial fixed-wing aircraft control them from inside a cockpit within the fuselage, typically located at the front/top, equipped with controls, windows, and instruments, separated from passengers by a secure door. In small aircraft, the passengers typically sit behind the pilot(s) in the cabin, Occasionally, a passenger may sit beside or in front of the pilot. Larger passenger aircraft have a separate passenger cabin or occasionally cabins that are physically separated from the cockpit.

Aircraft often have two or more pilots, with one in overall command (the "pilot") and one or more "co-pilots". On larger aircraft a navigator is typically also seated in the cockpit as well. Some military or specialized aircraft may have other flight crew members in the cockpit as well.

=== Wings vs. bodies ===
==== Flying wing ====
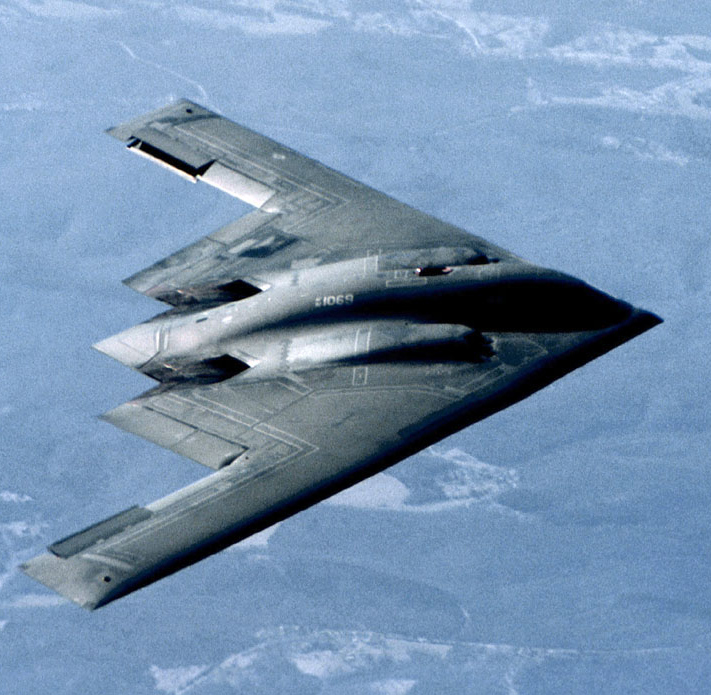
The US-produced B-2 Spirit, a strategic bomber capable of intercontinental missions, has a flying wing configuration

A flying wing is a tailless aircraft that has no distinct fuselage, housing the crew, payload, and equipment inside.

The flying wing configuration was studied extensively in the 1930s and 1940s, notably by Jack Northrop and Cheston L. Eshelman in the United States, and Alexander Lippisch and the Horten brothers in Germany. After the war, numerous experimental designs were based on the flying wing concept. General interest continued into the 1950s, but designs did not offer a great advantage in range and presented technical problems. The flying wing is most practical for designs in the slow-to-medium speed range, and drew continual interest as a tactical airlifter design.

Interest in flying wings reemerged in the 1980s due to their potentially low radar cross-sections. Stealth technology relies on shapes that reflect radar waves only in certain directions, thus making it harder to detect. This approach eventually led to the Northrop B-2 Spirit stealth bomber (pictured). The flying wing's aerodynamics are not the primary concern. Computer-controlled fly-by-wire systems compensated for many of the aerodynamic drawbacks, enabling an efficient and stable long-range aircraft.

==== Blended wing body ====
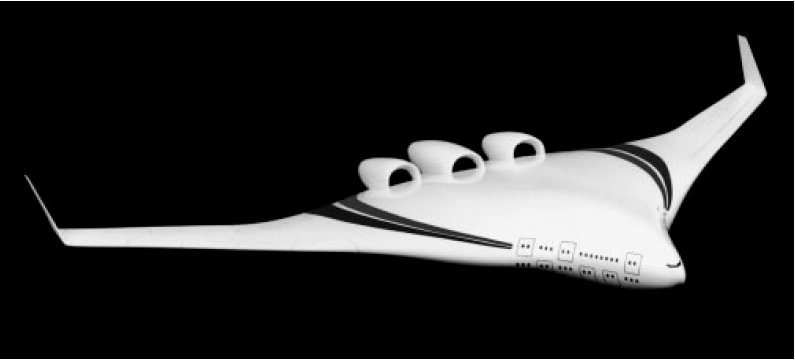
Computer-generated model of the Boeing X-48

Blended wing body aircraft have a flattened airfoil-shaped body, which produces most of the lift to keep itself aloft, and distinct and separate wing structures, though the wings are blended with the body.

Blended wing bodied aircraft incorporate design features from both fuselage and flying wing designs. The purported advantages of the blended wing body approach are efficient, high-lift wings and a wide, airfoil-shaped body. This enables the entire craft to contribute to lift generation with potentially increased fuel economy.

==== Lifting body ====
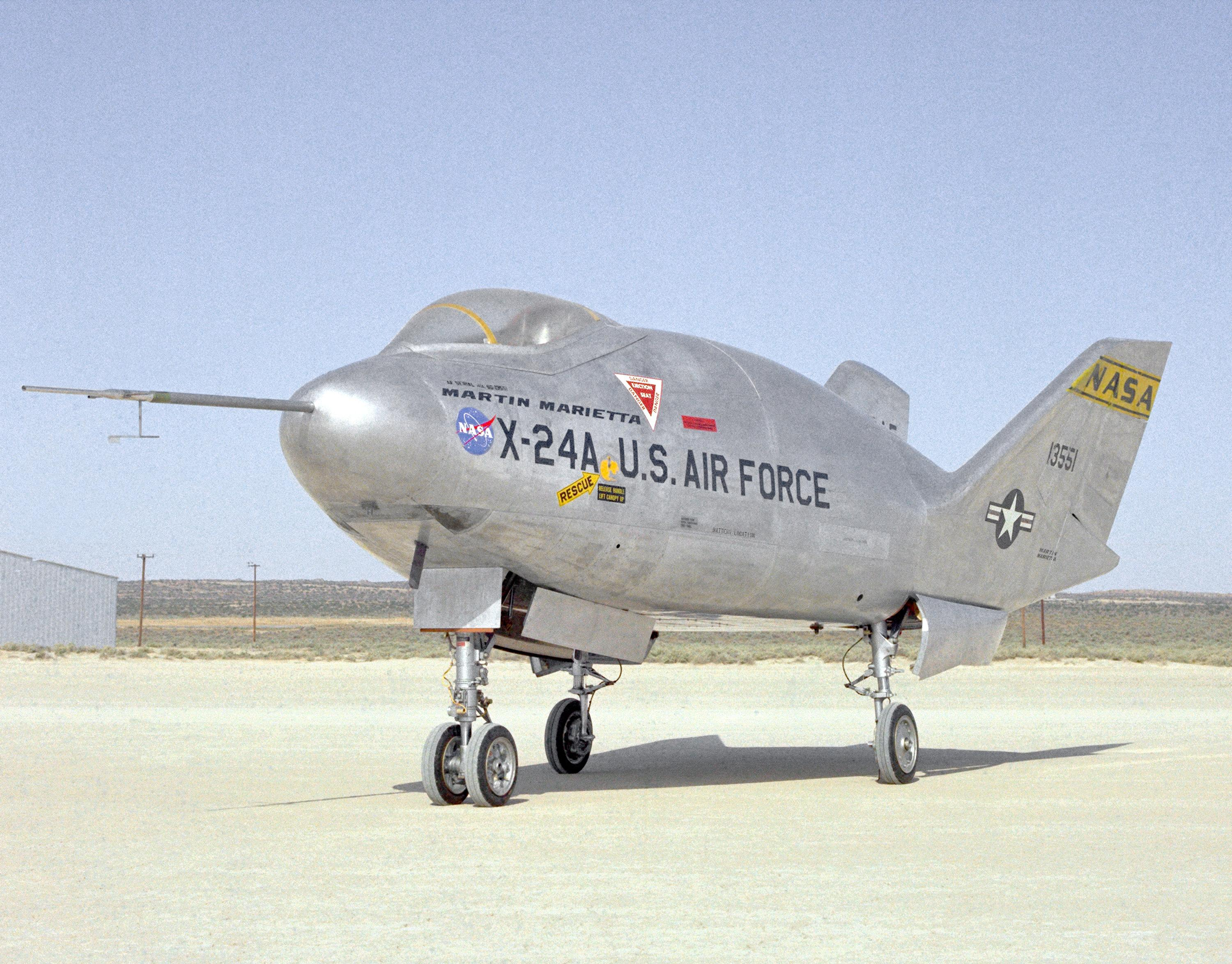
The Martin Aircraft Company X-24 was built as part of a 1963–1975 experimental US military program

A lifting body is a configuration in which the body produces lift. In contrast to a flying wing, which is a wing with minimal or no conventional fuselage, a lifting body can be thought of as a fuselage with little or no conventional wing. Whereas a flying wing seeks to maximize cruise efficiency at subsonic speeds by eliminating non-lifting surfaces, lifting bodies generally minimize the drag and structure of a wing for subsonic, supersonic, and hypersonic flight, or, spacecraft re-entry. All of these flight regimes pose challenges for flight stability.

Lifting bodies were a major area of research in the 1960s and 1970s as a means to build small and lightweight crewed spacecraft. The US built lifting body rocket planes to test the concept, as well as several rocket-launched re-entry vehicles. Interest waned as the US Air Force lost interest in the crewed mission, and major development ended during the Space Shuttle design process when it became clear that highly shaped fuselages made it difficult to fit fuel tanks.

=== Empennage and foreplane ===
The classic airfoil section wing is unstable in flight. Flexible-wing planes often rely on an anchor line or the weight of a pilot hanging beneath to maintain the correct attitude. Some free-flying types use an adapted airfoil that is stable, or other mechanisms including electronic artificial stability.

In order to achieve trim, stability, and control, most fixed-wing types have an empennage comprising a fin and rudder that act horizontally, and a tailplane and elevator that act vertically. This is so common that it is known as the conventional layout. Sometimes two or more fins are spaced out along the tailplane.

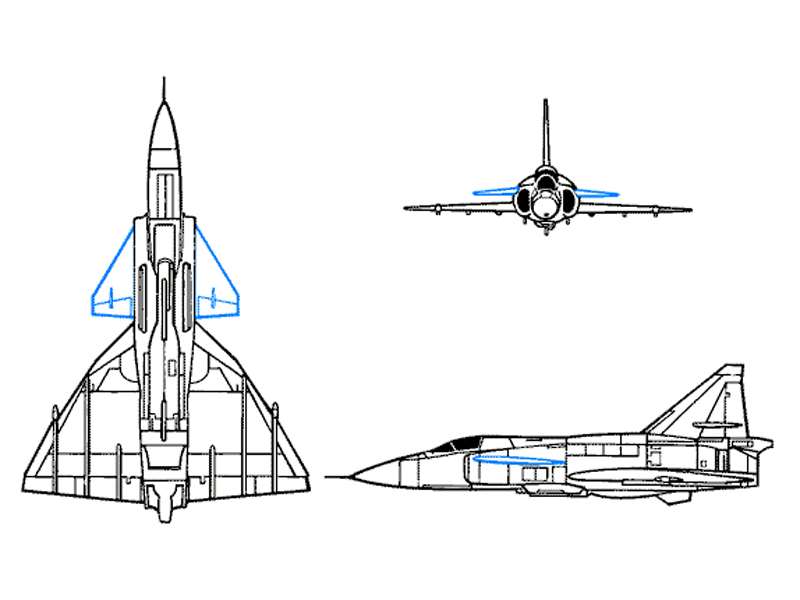
Canards on the Saab Viggen

Some types have a horizontal "canard" foreplane ahead of the main wing, instead of behind it. This foreplane may contribute to the trim, stability or control of the aircraft, or to several of these.

=== Aircraft controls ===
==== Kite control ====
Kites are controlled by one or more tethers.

==== Free-flying aircraft controls ====
Gliders and airplanes have sophisticated control systems, especially if they are piloted.

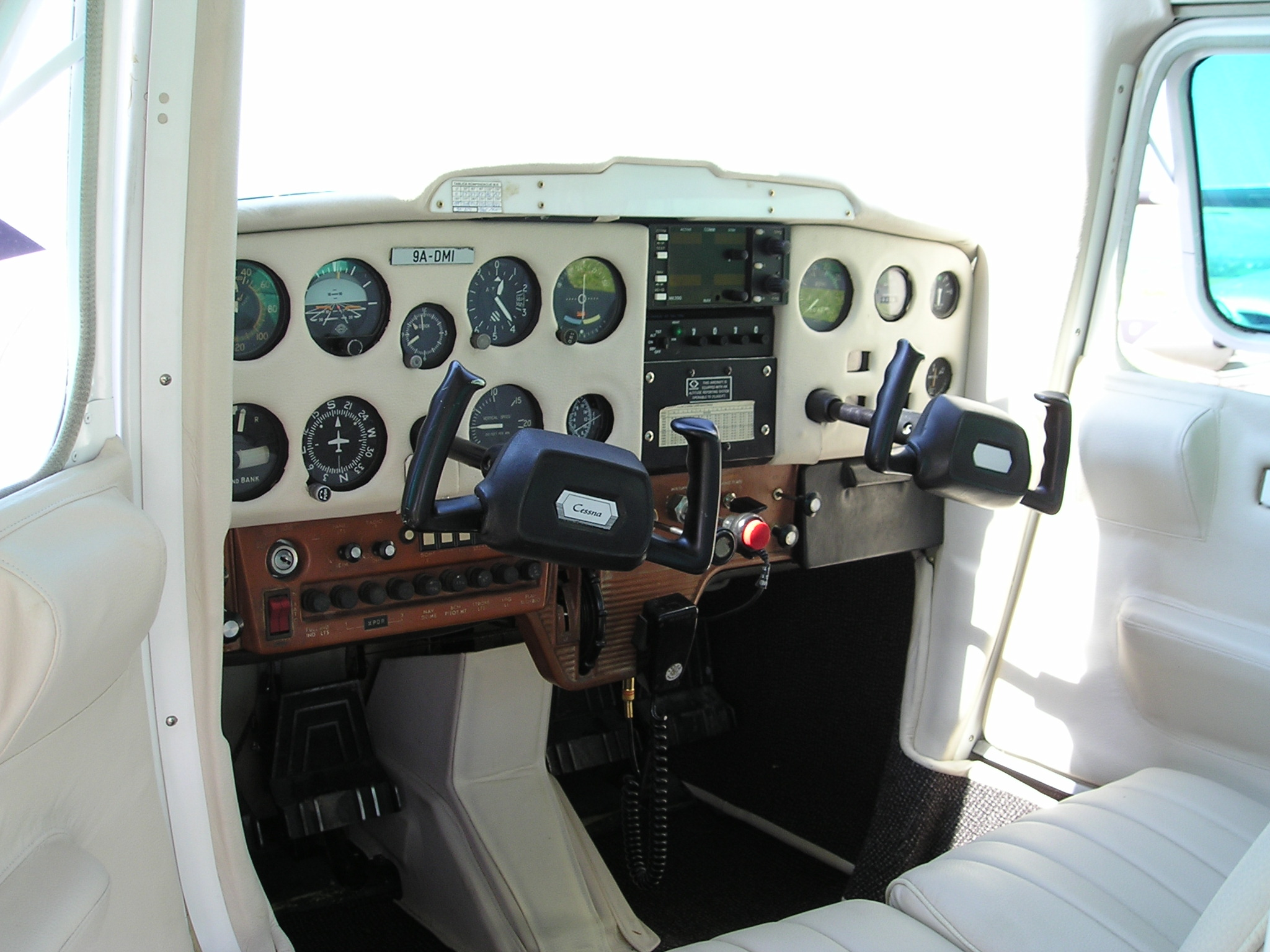
Typical light aircraft (Cessna 150M) cockpit with control yokes

The controls allow the pilot to direct the aircraft in the air and on the ground. Typically these are:

- The yoke or joystick controls rotation of the plane about the pitch and roll axes. A yoke resembles a steering wheel. The pilot can pitch the plane down by pushing on the yoke or joystick, and pitch the plane up by pulling on it. Rolling the plane is accomplished by turning the yoke in the direction of the desired roll, or by tilting the joystick in that direction.
- Rudder pedals control rotation of the plane about the yaw axis. Two pedals pivot so that when one is pressed forward the other moves backward, and vice versa. The pilot presses on the right rudder pedal to make the plane yaw to the right, and pushes on the left pedal to make it yaw to the left. The rudder is used mainly to balance the plane in turns, or to compensate for winds or other effects that push the plane about the yaw axis.
- On powered types, an engine stop control ("fuel cutoff", for example) and, usually, a throttle or thrust lever and other controls, such as a fuel-mixture control (to compensate for air density changes with altitude change).

Other common controls include:

- Flap levers, which are used to control the deflection position of flaps on the wings.
- Spoiler levers, which are used to control the position of spoilers on the wings, and to arm their automatic deployment in planes designed to deploy them upon landing. The spoilers reduce lift for landing.
- Trim controls, which usually take the form of knobs or wheels and are used to adjust pitch, roll, or yaw trim. These are often connected to small airfoils on the trailing edge of the control surfaces and are called "trim tabs". Trim is used to reduce the amount of pressure on the control forces needed to maintain a steady course.
- On wheeled types, brakes are used to slow and stop the plane on the ground, and sometimes for turns on the ground.

A craft may have two pilot seats with dual controls, allowing two to take turns.

The control system may allow full or partial automation, such as an autopilot, a wing leveler, or a flight management system. An unmanned aircraft has no pilot and is controlled remotely or via gyroscopes, computers/sensors or other forms of autonomous control.

=== Cockpit instrumentation ===
On manned fixed-wing aircraft, instruments provide information to the pilots, including flight, engines, navigation, communications, and other aircraft systems that may be installed.

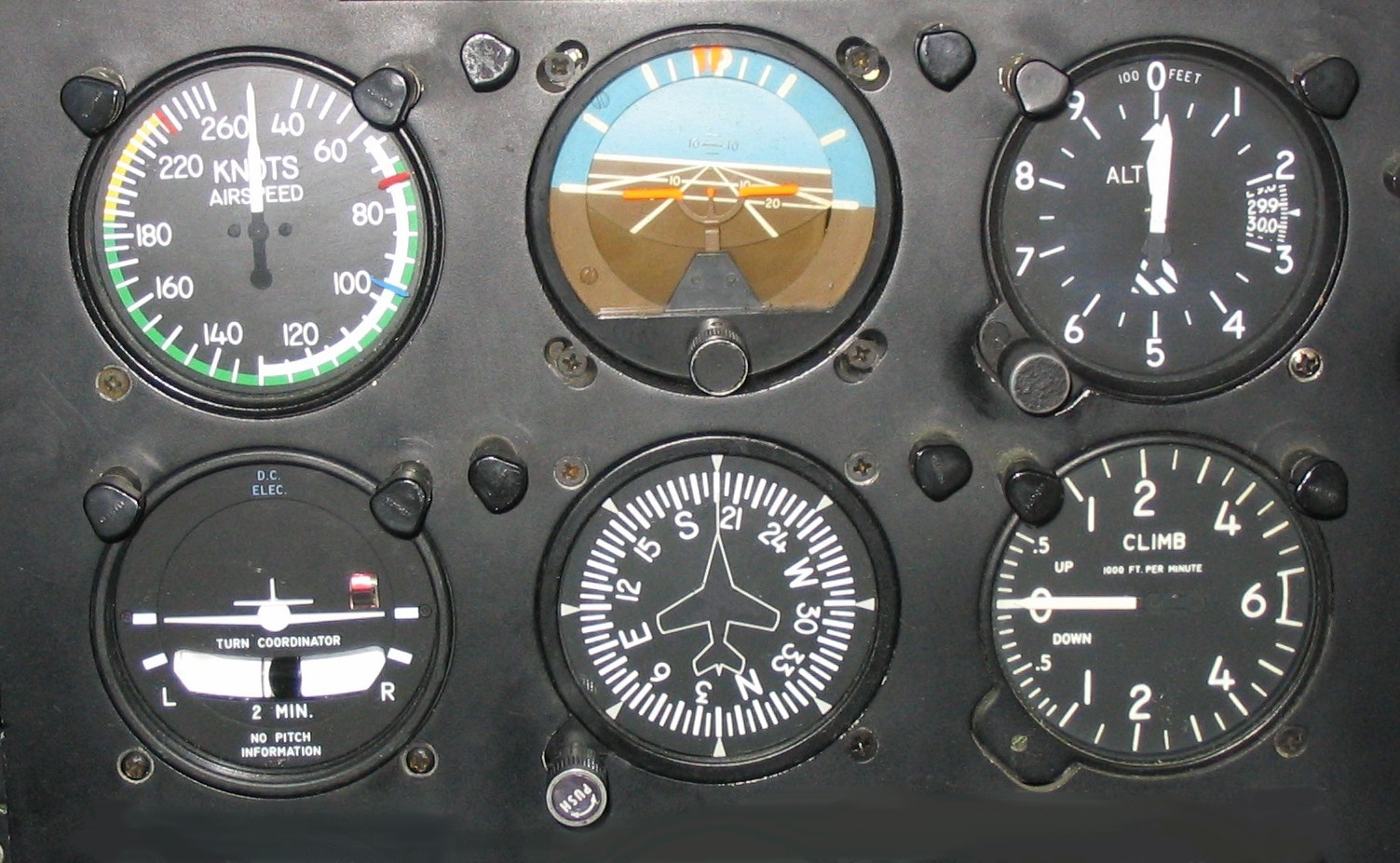
The six basic flight instruments. Top row (left to right): airspeed indicator, attitude indicator, altimeter. Bottom row (left to right): turn coordinator, heading indicator, vertical speed indicator.

The six basic instruments, sometimes referred to as the six pack, are:

- The airspeed indicator (ASI) shows the speed at which the plane is moving through the air.
- The attitude indicator (AI), sometimes called the artificial horizon, indicates the exact orientation of the aircraft about its pitch and roll axes.
- The altimeter indicates the altitude or height of the plane above mean sea level (AMSL).
- The vertical speed indicator (VSI), or variometer, shows the rate at which the plane is climbing or descending.
- The heading indicator (HI), sometimes called the directional gyro (DG), shows the magnetic compass orientation of the fuselage. The direction is affected by wind conditions and magnetic declination.
- The turn coordinator (TC), or turn and bank indicator, helps the pilot to control the plane in a coordinated attitude while turning.

Other cockpit instruments include:

- A two-way radio, to enable communications with other planes and with air traffic control.
- A horizontal situation indicator (HSI) indicates the position and movement of the plane as seen from above with respect to the ground, including course/heading and other information.
- Instruments showing the status of the plane's engines (operating speed, thrust, temperature, and other variables).
- Combined display systems such as primary flight displays or navigation aids.
- Information displays such as onboard weather radar displays.
- A radio direction finder (RDF), to indicate the direction to one or more radio beacons, which can be used to determine the plane's position.
- A satellite navigation (satnav) system, to provide an accurate position.

Some or all of these instruments may appear on a computer display and be operated with touches, ala a phone.

== See also ==
- Aircraft flight mechanics
- Airliner
- Aviation
- Aviation and the environment
- Aviation history
- Fuel efficiency
- List of altitude records reached by different aircraft types
- Maneuvering speed
- Rotorcraft

	Aerostat	Aerodyne		
	Lift: Lighter than air gas	Lift: Fixed wing	Lift: Unpowered rotor	Lift: Powered rotor
Unpowered free flight	(Free) balloon	Glider	Helicopter, etc. in autorotation	(None – see note 2)
Tethered (static or towed)	Tethered balloon	Kite	Rotor kite	(None – see note 2)
Powered	Airship	Airplane, ornithopter, etc.	Autogyro	Gyrodyne, helicopter
