= Gayla =

Gayla is a given name. Notable people with the name include:

- Gayla Drake (born 1964), American guitarist and singer/songwriter
- Gayla Margolin, American psychologist
- Gayla Hendren McKenzie, American politician
- Gayla Peevey (born 1943), child star from Ponca City, Oklahoma who sang "I Want a Hippopotamus for Christmas" (Columbia, 1953)
- Gayla Reid (born 1945), Australian-born Canadian writer
- Gayla Trail, (born 1973), Canadian writer, gardener, designer, photographer, and blogger

== See also ==
- Gayla Industries, a manufacturer (and inventor of) keel-guided delta-wing kites and other flying toys
