= Rokkaku =

Rokkaku (Japanese: 六角, "six corners" or "hexagon") can refer to several things:

- Rokkaku Chuu (市立六角中学校), a fictional school that appears on The Prince of Tennis
- Rokkaku clan, a clan of samurai
- Rokkaku dako, a type of six-cornered kite
- Rokkaku-dō (temple), a temple in Kyoto
- Rokkaku-dai Heights, a level from the video game Jet Set Radio Future
