= Diamond kite =

Type of tethered kite

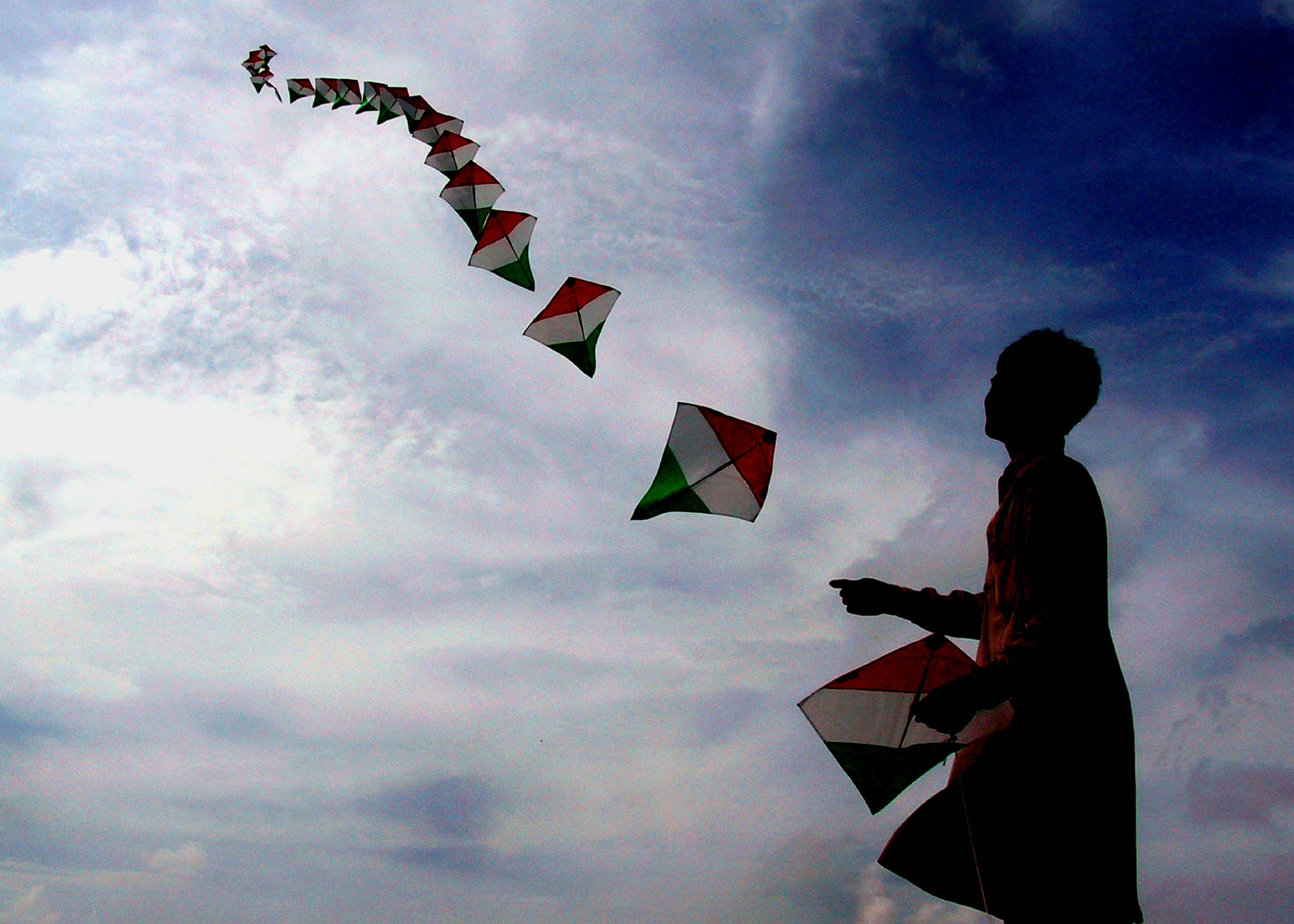
Boy flying multiple diamond kites simultaneously

A diamond kite, also called an Eddy kite or Malay kite, is a traditional single-line kite with a diamond-shaped planform. It is typically constructed with a frame of two crossed spars, a fabric sail (commonly nylon), and a stabilizing tail. It is simple to assemble and fly, performs best in light to moderate winds, and is widely used as a beginner's kite and for recreational flying, particularly by children. One of the most widely recognized kite designs in the Western world, the diamond kite has remained popular for centuries due to its stable and dependable flying characteristics.

Since their introduction to Europe, diamond kites have been employed for a range of practical applications. These have included aerial photography, meteorological observation, and the transmission of long-distance radio signals, reflecting a historical development similar to that of box kites. The historical Eddy kite was invented by William Abner Eddy in the 1890s, drawing inspiration from traditional Javanese bowed kites, which were often referred to as "Malay kites".

== History ==
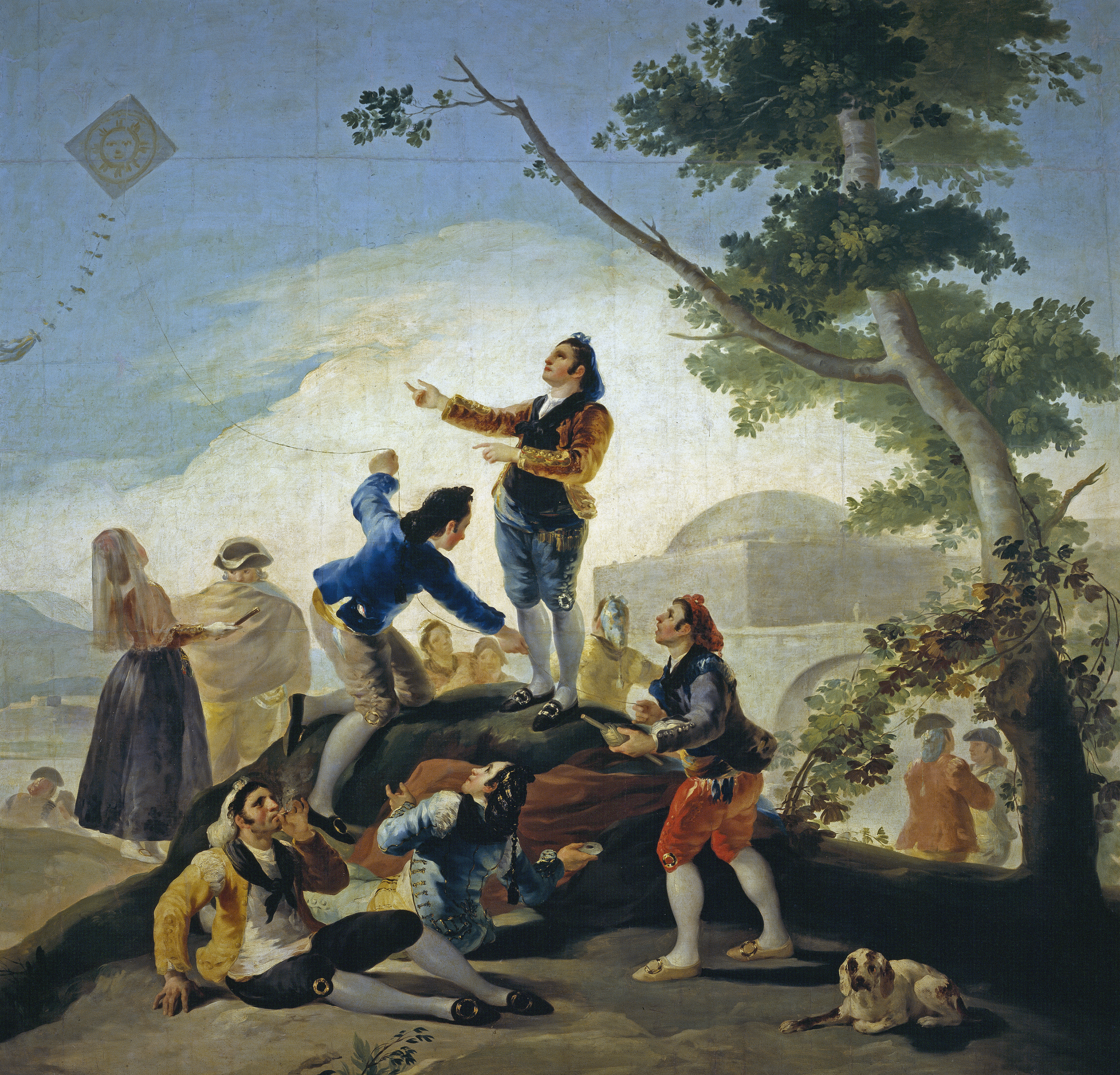
The Kite (1777) by Francisco Goya features a diamond-shaped kite.

By 1634, kites had reached the West, with an illustration of a diamond kite with a tail appearing in John Bate's The Mysteryes of Nature and Art. Benjamin Franklin proposed the use of kites in electrical experiments in the mid-18th century. In a letter written in October 1752, he described constructing a kite from a "large thin silk handkerchief" supported by "a small cross of two light strips of cedar", indicating the use of a diamond-shaped kite.

During the Victorian era, the arch-top kite was a popular design. It resembled the diamond kite in both appearance and flight characteristics, but differed in having a single curved upper edge in place of the two straight upper edges of the diamond form. This arched profile gave the design its name.

In the late 19th century, William Abner Eddy of the United States made significant contributions to the scientific application of kites. Eddy developed tailless diamond-kite designs that were flown in linked sequences, known as kite trains, to raise meteorological instruments to high altitudes. By 1892, his kites incorporated a bowed cross-spar that allowed stable flight without a tail. In 1893, the World's Columbian Exposition gave him the chance to acquire an authentic Malay kite, which inspired further improvements and led to what is now known as the diamond Eddy kite. He also improved the method for chaining several kites. Previously each kite had been tied to the previous one. Instead, he made the individual kites' lines branch off a common main line. The resulting "Eddy diamond" played a major role in popularizing the diamond-shaped kite in the Western world.

Despite these developments, box kites and related designs proved more effective for heavy lifting and scientific work. Following the invention of the box kite by Australian engineer Lawrence Hargrave in the late 19th century, the diamond kite largely declined in scientific use. Throughout its history, however, the diamond kite has remained in recreational use. Although its popularity has fluctuated over time, it has continued to be flown for leisure and remains a widely recognized and enduring kite design.

== Design ==
=== Eddy kites ===
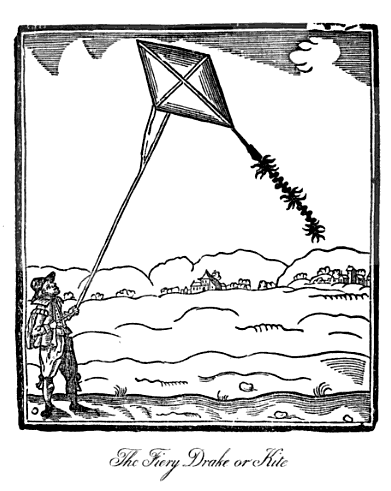
Illustration depicting a diamond kite design in The Mysteries of Nature and Art by John Bate

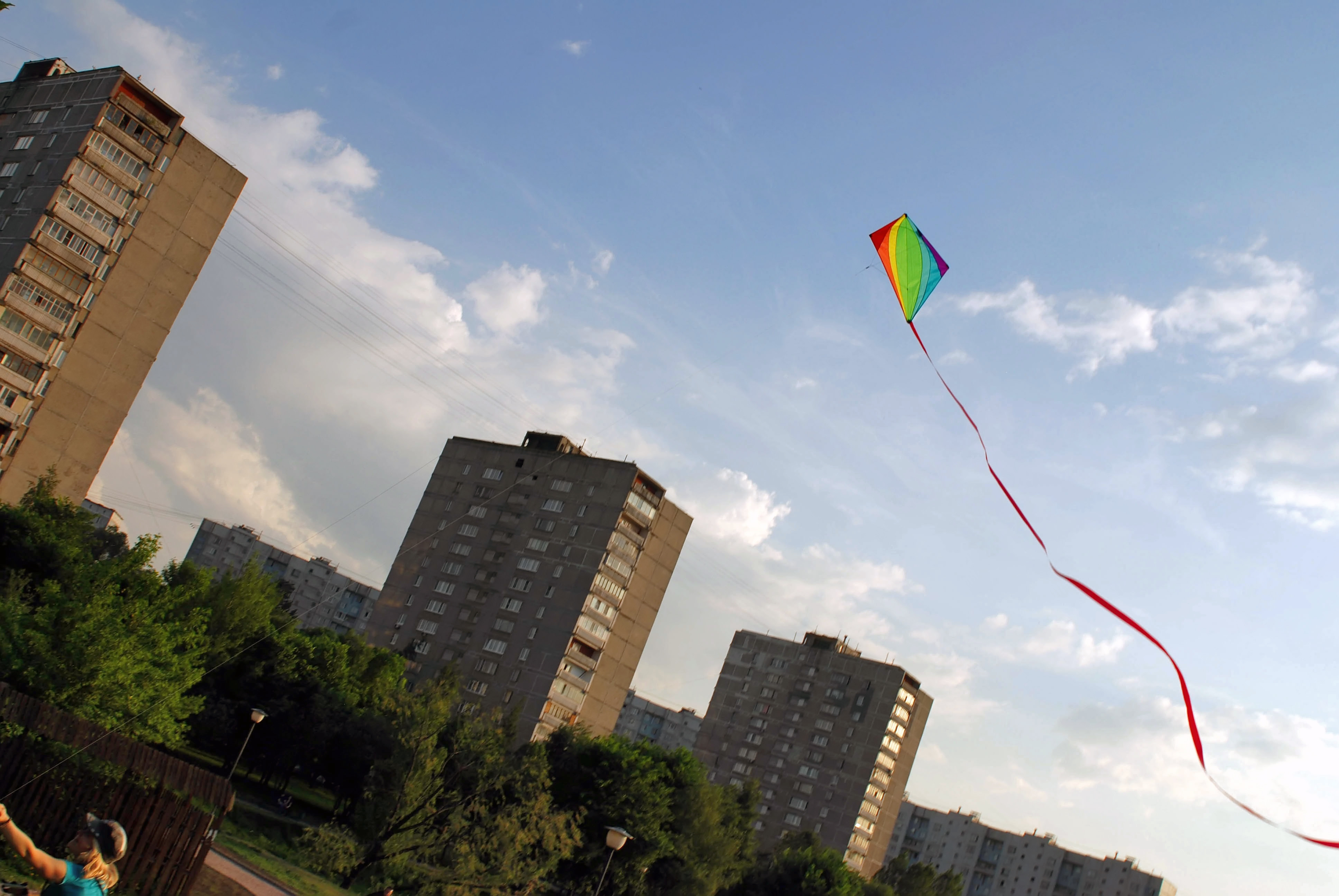
Rainbow-colored diamond kite flying in Moscow, Russia

The traditional eddy kite is sometimes referred to as a ‘two-stick kite’, a term that reflects its basic frame structure consisting of a vertical spar spanning from nose to tail and a horizontal cross spar. Although less common today, diamond kites may also be flown with a bowed cross spar. When positioned sufficiently close to the nose, this configuration can remove the need for a tail. The bow may be created by straining the spar with string to induce flex, or by constructing the cross spar in two sections attached to the vertical spar at a tilt, a configuration known as dihedral. The eddy kite is a traditional diamond-shaped kite design constructed using a simple wooden frame and paper or fabric covering. The frame consists of two sticks of equal length, typically shaped and smoothed to uniform dimensions. One stick forms the vertical spine, while the other serves as a curved cross spar, which is bent to create the kite's characteristic shape. The cross spar is attached to the spine slightly above its midpoint, with the bend facing inward toward the spine. The two-point bridle was attached at the spar intersection and the extreme tail end, making the Eddy kite particularly well suited for use in kite trains, where tails could otherwise become entangled.

An outline string is secured to the four corners of the frame and defines the kite's perimeter. This string provides structural support and helps maintain the kite's shape once the covering material is applied. The covering is cut slightly larger than the frame and attached by folding and gluing it around the outline string, allowing for controlled looseness to improve flight stability. The bridle consists of a single line attached at the intersection of the frame sticks and at the lower corner of the kite. The flying line is tied just below the intersection point, enabling the kite to achieve a stable flying angle. Unlike many other kite types, the Eddy kite does not require a tail for balance. Eddy kites are commonly decorated after construction. A checkerboard pattern is frequently used, as high-contrast designs enhance visibility during flight. The classic Eddy kite had a bowed cross spar and a loose sail, which folded back against the spine to form a keel at its lower end, enhancing stability. In their original forms, both Malay and Eddy kites are bowed kites with the traditional diamond shape, differing primarily in their proportions. For the average kite enthusiast, distinguishing between a Malay and an Eddy kite can be difficult.

=== Modern diamond kites ===
Unlike the historical Eddy kite, most modern retail diamond kites are equipped with tails and incorporate some degree of dihedral or a bow in the horizontal spar, which improves stability and allows for shorter tails. Diamond kites vary in size, though most are less than 1 meter (3 ft) in height. The cross spar may intersect the vertical spar near the center, producing a near-square form, or closer to the top, creating the traditional diamond shape. Construction may include a perimeter line threaded around the ends of the spars to define the sail's outline, though this is not universal. Flat diamond kites typically require a tail for stability, which may take various forms, including ribbons, streamers, or lines with bows. Decorative styles range widely, with both handmade and commercially produced kites available in a variety of designs. When the cross spar is sufficiently bowed and positioned high on the vertical spar, a diamond kite can achieve stable flight lacking a tail. The bridle is conventionally connected at two points along the vertical spar, rather than at its extreme ends. Historically, sails were made from paper; however, modern diamond kites commonly use materials such as plastic, nylon, or polyester.

When the cross spar is bowed away from the flying line, the kite requires less tail for stable flight and, in some configurations, may not require a tail at all. Lightly constructed flat diamond kites may naturally develop a slight bow in strong winds, which can increase stability under such conditions. Strips of differently colored material may be joined prior to cutting the kite’s outline. The appliqué technique involves attaching lightweight, colorful cutout patterns to the sail. Printed sail materials are also used, and hand painting or airbrushing may be used after construction. Modern diamond kites may feature either a bowed cross spar or a dihedral angle and may incorporate a keel to improve stability and reduce reliance on a bridle. Diamond kites are sometimes loosely referred to as Eddys or Malays, although they may differ substantially from the original designs. Some designs rely on wind pressure to induce the bow; without it, they may exhibit unstable flight patterns. In the Philippines, chapi-chapi is a type of diamond kite typically constructed from scrapped broomsticks and recycled newspaper. Smaller commercially produced versions often require stronger winds due to a reduced lift-to-weight ratio and the need for spars of sufficient strength to withstand handling.

== See also ==
- Delta kite
