= Gayla Trail =

Gayla Trail (born July 31, 1973, in St. Catharines, Ontario) is a Canadian writer, gardener, designer, and photographer. She is the founder of the website You Grow Girl.

== Books ==
- You Grow Girl: The Ground Breaking Guide to Gardening (2005)
- Grow Great Grub: Organic Food from Small Spaces (2010)
- Easy Growing (2012)
- Drinking the Summer Garden (2012)
- Grow Curious: Creative Activities to Cultivate Joy, Wonder, and Discovery in Your Garden (2017)
