= Gayla Margolin =

Psychologist

- Education: BA, MA, PhD
- Alma mater: University of Wisconsin, University of Oregon
- Known for: Domestic violence, Marital therapy
- Scientific career
- Fields: Clinical psychology
- Institutions: University of Southern California
- Thesis: A comparative evaluation of therapeutic components associated with behavioral marital treatments (1976)

Gayla Margolin is an American psychologist doing research on adolescence and the effect of domestic violence on children. She has also done research on coparenting and marital therapy. She is a professor of psychology and pediatrics at the University of Southern California where she leads the Family Studies Project.

== Education ==
Margolin graduated with a BA in psychology from the University of Wisconsin in 1971. She subsequently studied clinical psychology at the University of Oregon where she received an MA in 1973 and a PhD in 1976.

== Selected publications ==
=== Books ===
- Jacobson NS, Margolin G. Marital therapy: Strategies based on social learning and behavior exchange principles. Psychology Press; 1979.

=== Scientific articles ===
- Doumas D, Margolin G, John RS. The intergenerational transmission of aggression across three generations. Journal of Family Violence. 1994 Jun 1;9(2):157-75.
- Margolin G, Gordis EB. The effects of family and community violence on children. Annual review of psychology. 2000 Feb;51(1):445-79.
- Margolin G, Gordis EB, John RS. Coparenting: a link between marital conflict and parenting in two-parent families. Journal of Family Psychology. 2001 Mar;15(1):3.
- Margolin G, Vickerman KA. Posttraumatic stress in children and adolescents exposed to family violence: I. Overview and issues. Professional Psychology: Research and Practice. 2007 Dec;38(6):613.
- Margolin G, Ramos MC, Baucom BR, Bennett DC, Guran EL. Substance use, aggression perpetration, and victimization: temporal co-occurrence in college males and females. Journal of interpersonal violence. 2013 Sep;28(14):2849-72.
- Margolin G, Ramos MC, Timmons AC, Miller KF, Han SC. Intergenerational transmission of aggression: physiological regulatory processes. Child development perspectives. 2016 Mar;10(1):15-21.

=== Book chapters ===
- Margolin, G. Effects of domestic violence on children. In Trickett & Schellenbach (editors), Violence against children in the family and the community (pp. 57-101). Washington DC: American Psychological Association, 1998.
