= Malay kite =

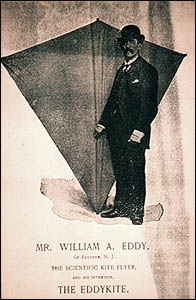
The common and widely popular "Eddy" kite design, shown here behind its patenter, W. A. Eddy.

The Malay kite is a model of tailless kite. Possibly first introduced to the Western world in a New York City newspaper article from October 1894, the Malay kite was used for recreation for centuries in parts of the Far East. The article detailed how a university professor ("Clayton") had erected a series of kites and bound them together to form one kite. These kites had no tail, were bowed and diamond-shaped, and were referred to by the author as "Malay" kites. However, the existence of a Malay-like design may already have been heard of in the United States sometime before the publishing of the article; in the last edition of the American Boy's Handy Book, another tailless kite was described and referred to as a "Holland" kite. The description of this kite, which was to be included as a chapter in the book, was sent in to the author sometime around 1882, eleven years before the Malay kite was mentioned in the newspaper.

== Design ==
The Malay kite is similar in design to the standard Eddy design. The precise design of the kite consists of two flexible cross sticks, diverging at right angles, to form a lozenge-like shape. The horizontal stick is preferably slightly longer than the vertical one. Once they have been bound together, a string or cord is tightened around the resulting lozenge. The design is then enveloped in the kite material, typically paper. This particular design, when correctly executed, allows the wind to carry the kite to great heights, despite its lack of any kind of tail.

This diamond-bowed design gave inspiration to other designs, such as the aforementioned and now popular "Eddy" kite, designed by William Abner Eddy of Bayonne, New Jersey. The "Eddy" model, created four years after the Western appearance of the Malay in 1894, and patented approximately twenty months after that — application for "Kite" filed on 1 August 1898, by "William A. Eddy of Bayonne, New Jersey", U.S. patent number 646375 (issued on 27 March 1900) — has grown to become one of the most common and popular designs of kite in the 21st century.

== See also ==
- Wau bulan, a significantly different kite of Malay origins.
- Kite types
- Diamond kite
