= The Mysteryes of Nature and Art =

Book by John Bate

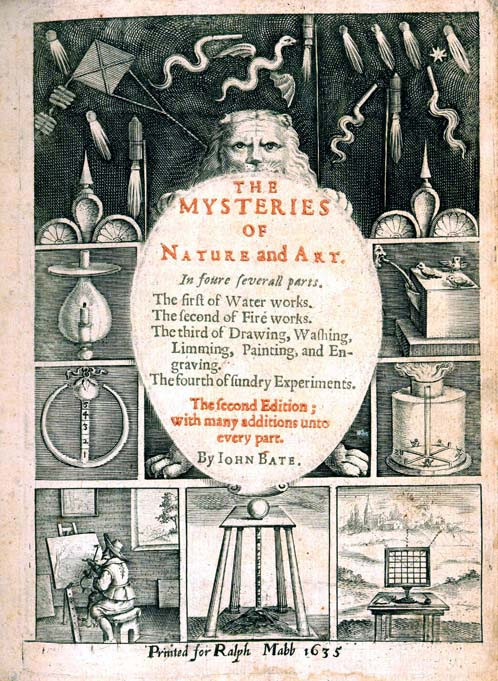
Second edition cover

The Mysteries of Nature and Art is a book by John Bate written in 1634. The book acts as a practical guide for amateur scientific experiments, and is divided into four sections: Water Workes; Fyer Workes; Drawing, Colouring, Painting and Engraving; and Divers Experiments. It inspired Isaac Newton during his younger years, in particular the section on fire Drakes, kites with firecrackers tied to their tails. It contains one of the earliest depictions of fireworks and their preparation to be detailed in the English language, in a similar manner to the preceding De la pirotechnia.
