= Bowed kite =

Bowed kites such as the Japanese rokkaku, and traditional versions of the more familiar "diamond" shaped kites such as the Malay or Eddy, are tensioned into a bow in order to improve their stability to the point where a tail often becomes unnecessary.

The classic long-tail diamond kite, with a simple two-point bridle, has its lateral roll or flutter (oscillation) greatly reduced or eliminated by a bow in its horizontal spar. Some modern designs use a fixed plastic joiner with a dihedral shape instead of a bowed spar to achieve the same stability effect.

== See also ==
- Tetrahedral kite
