= Delta kite =

Type of tethered wing

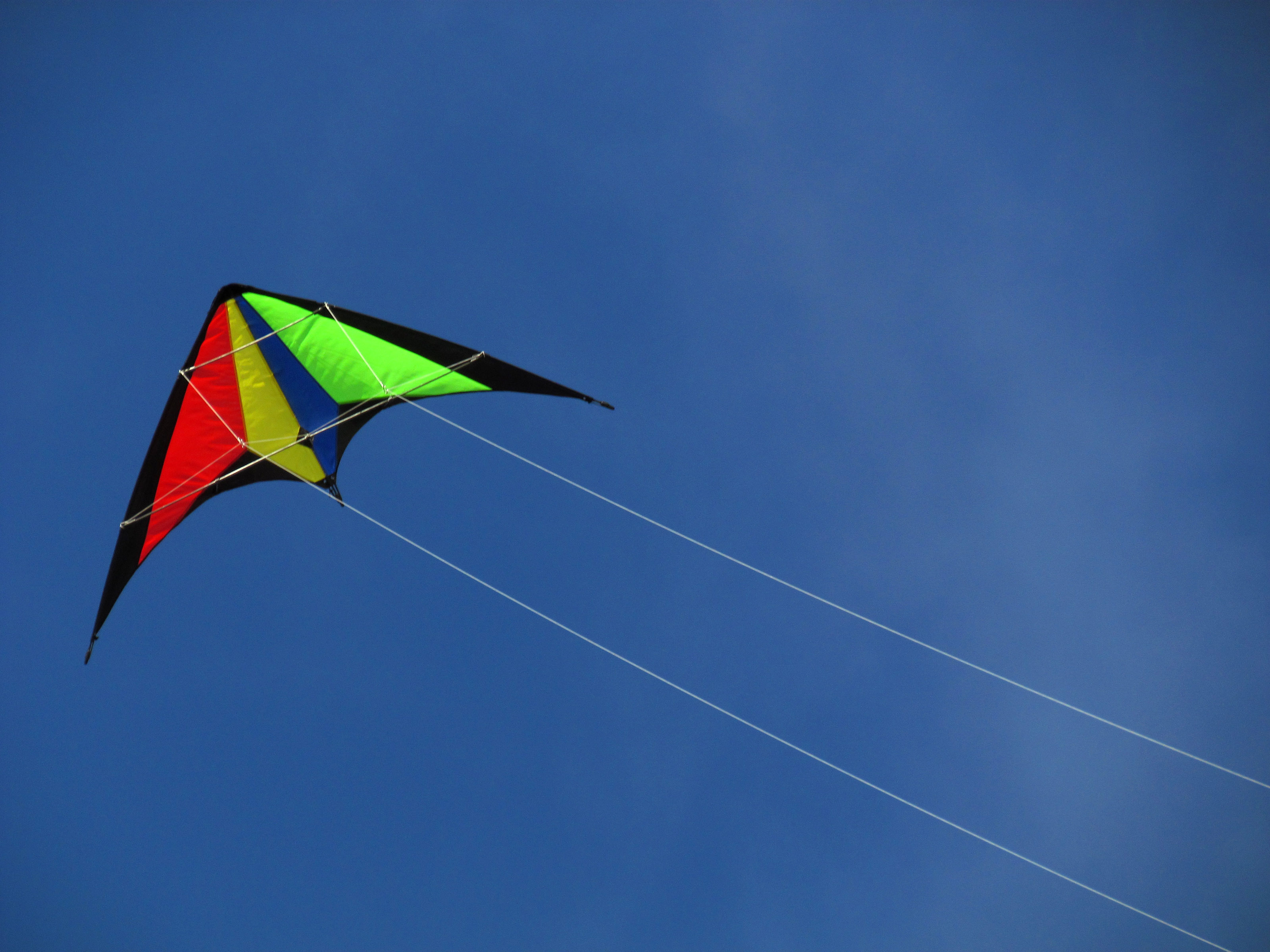
A delta kite

Delta kites are triangular-shaped kites noted for their stability, ease of assembly, and capability to fly in light winds. Their design resembles a hang glider, with flexible wings that respond to air currents, producing lifelike movement. The delta kite was developed in the mid-1940s by Wilbur Green, a Texas-based architect. Delta kites, like hang gliders, are based on Francis Rogallo's flexible wing. Delta kites are commonly recommended as general-purpose kites, particularly for beginners.

== History ==
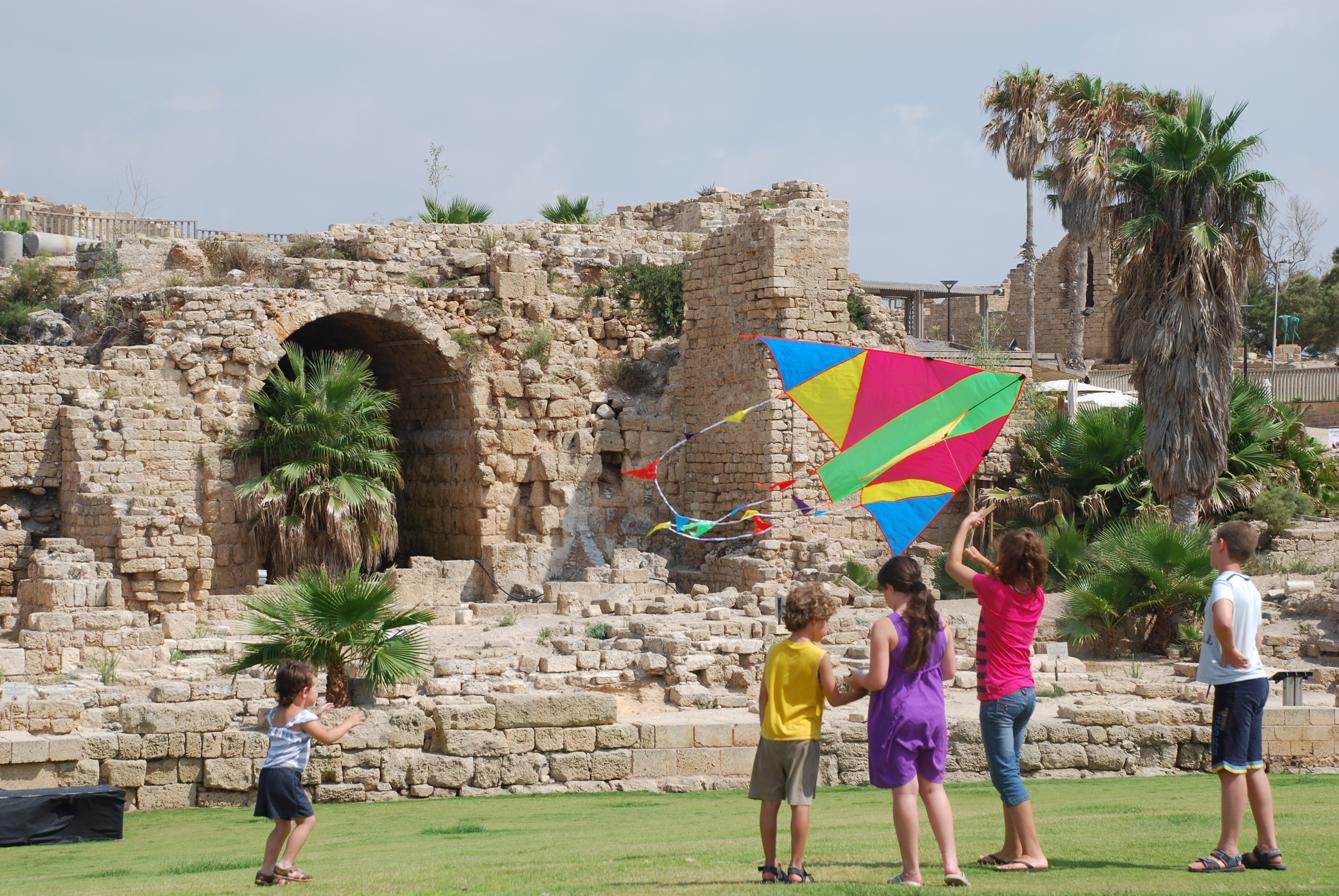
Children flying a delta kite

Delta kites traces their origins to a copy of a Chinese bird kite developed in the 1940s. The first prototype was constructed in 1945 by Wilbur “Bill” Green, an architect, whose design demonstrated exceptional flight performance and led to the establishment of a kite-making business. By 1957, this enterprise had effectively chartered the keeled kite and was marketing it under the Gayla brand. These early designs were meticulously handcrafted and capable of stable flight without tails, exemplifying the inherent stability of delta kites.

In 1961, Bill Green retired and sold the Gayla kite business. Around this time, these kites were increasingly referred to as deltas. In 1963, Al Hartig, known as “The Nantucket Kiteman,” introduced a new delta kite design named the Valkyrie, inspired by the Gayla model. The name 'delta' may have likely been coined for one of Hartig's kites in 1966. This design generated considerable interest in delta kites and contributed to a broader adoption of the style among kite makers. Another significant milestone occurred in the spring of 1974, when Bob Ingraham published a detailed construction guide for a high-performance delta kite in Kite Tales magazine. This article provided step-by-step instructions that continue to influence kite makers today.

Delta kites were actively experimented with and developed by American kite fliers during the 1970s. The most significant period of innovation occurred from the mid-1970s, when numerous delta variants began to emerge. Notably, Wagenvoord's well-known 1968 publication does not mention delta kites by name, although it includes a photograph of a Hartig delta flown in Central Park, New York; instead, it refers to “dart-shaped floaters.” Delta kites are explicitly discussed in The Penguin Book of Kites (1976) by David Pelham, where the use of an aluminium spine is recommended to improve stability and durability, particularly in variable or turbulent ground-level winds. In subsequent decades, delta kite production expanded globally, becoming one of the most widely manufactured and flown kite types, rendering further individual historical milestones less distinct.

== Design ==
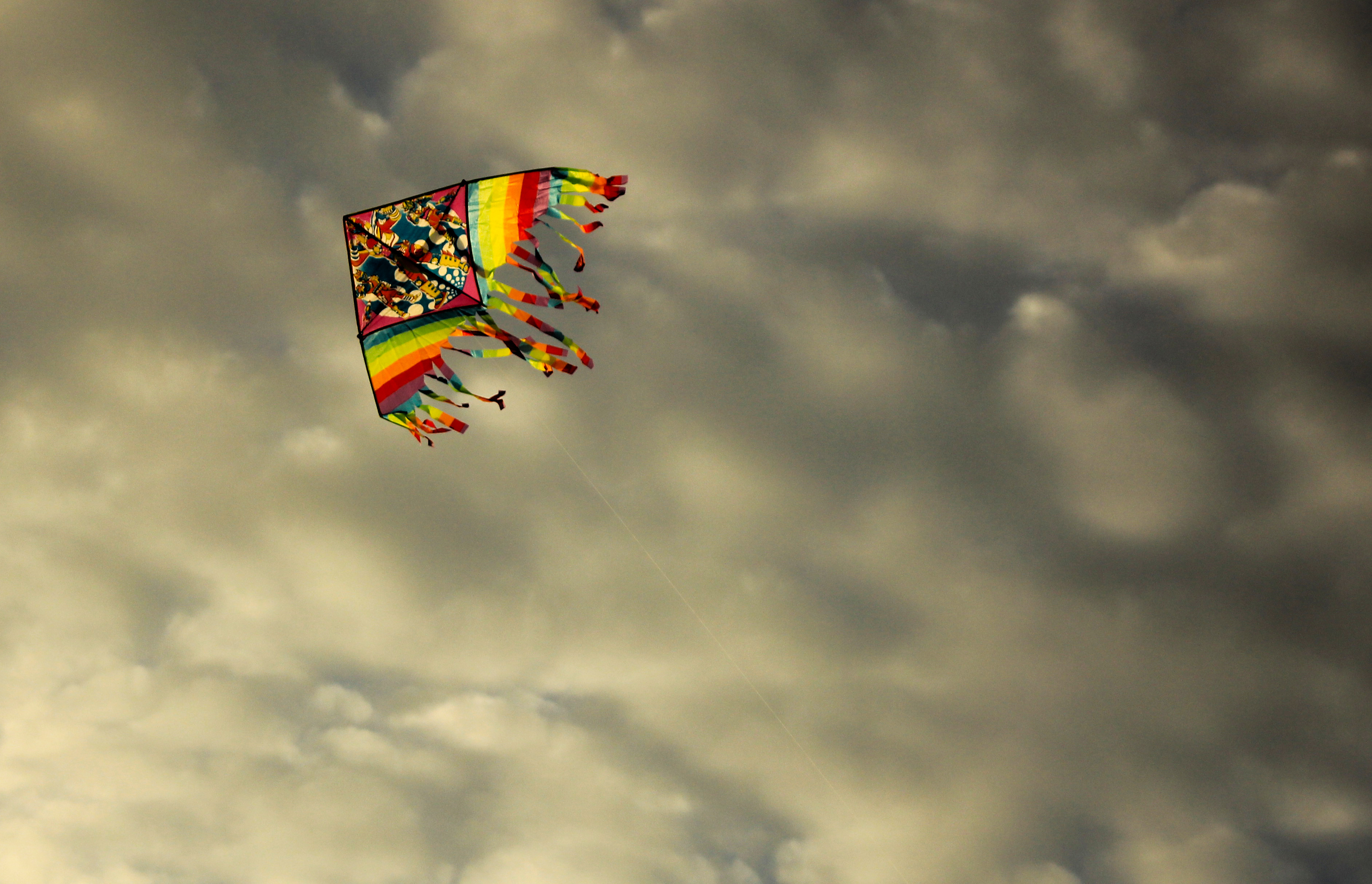
Delta kite with tails

The kite derives its name from the Greek letter delta (Δ) reflecting its characteristic shape and are generally easy to lift in light breezes. A modern design, it is popular among both beginners and experienced kite flyers and is typically constructed from lightweight nylon supported by wooden or carbon spars. Delta kites are characterized by their large, triangular (delta-shaped) sail supported by a central spine and two lateral wing spars. Most delta kites are fitted with at least one tail and frequently include additional short tails attached near each wingtip. Smaller delta kites may instead feature a fringe of unrestrained material through the trailing edge of the sail. This fringe serves a functional purpose, acting as a series of short tails that contribute to aerodynamic stability rather than merely providing decoration.

Delta kites are manufactured in a wide range of sizes, typically ranging from approximately 1 metre (3 feet) in wingspan to substantially larger models. According to kite retailers, delta kites with a wingspan of approximately 2 metres (6 feet) are the most commonly sold and widely used size. The airborne silhouette of a delta kite often leads to comparisons with bats or birds, and it is sometimes described as a wing kite. This resemblance is particularly pronounced in designs featuring a curved trailing edge and additional battens within the sail, which enhance the kite's wing-like appearance in flight. Most delta kites incorporate a flexible keel connected to the bottom of the central vertical spar. This feature enhances stability by acting as a vane, helping to maintain the kite's orientation into the wind. When the cross spar, or spreader, is removed, a delta kite can be rolled into a compact, narrow bundle, allowing for convenient transport and storage.

Kite sails may be constructed from joined strips of coloured fabric, decorated using appliqué, or produced from printed materials in mass-manufactured designs. Home-built kites may also be hand-painted or airbrushed after construction. In some delta kites, the keel serves as the bridle, with the towing point located at the keel tip. As this point is not easily adjustable, different designs position it according to intended wind conditions: further toward the tail for light winds and closer to the nose for stronger winds. Some designs include multiple towing points to provide limited adjustment. Ripstop nylon is commonly used for kite sails, while lightweight spinnaker fabric is often employed for light-wind delta kites.

== Flight ==
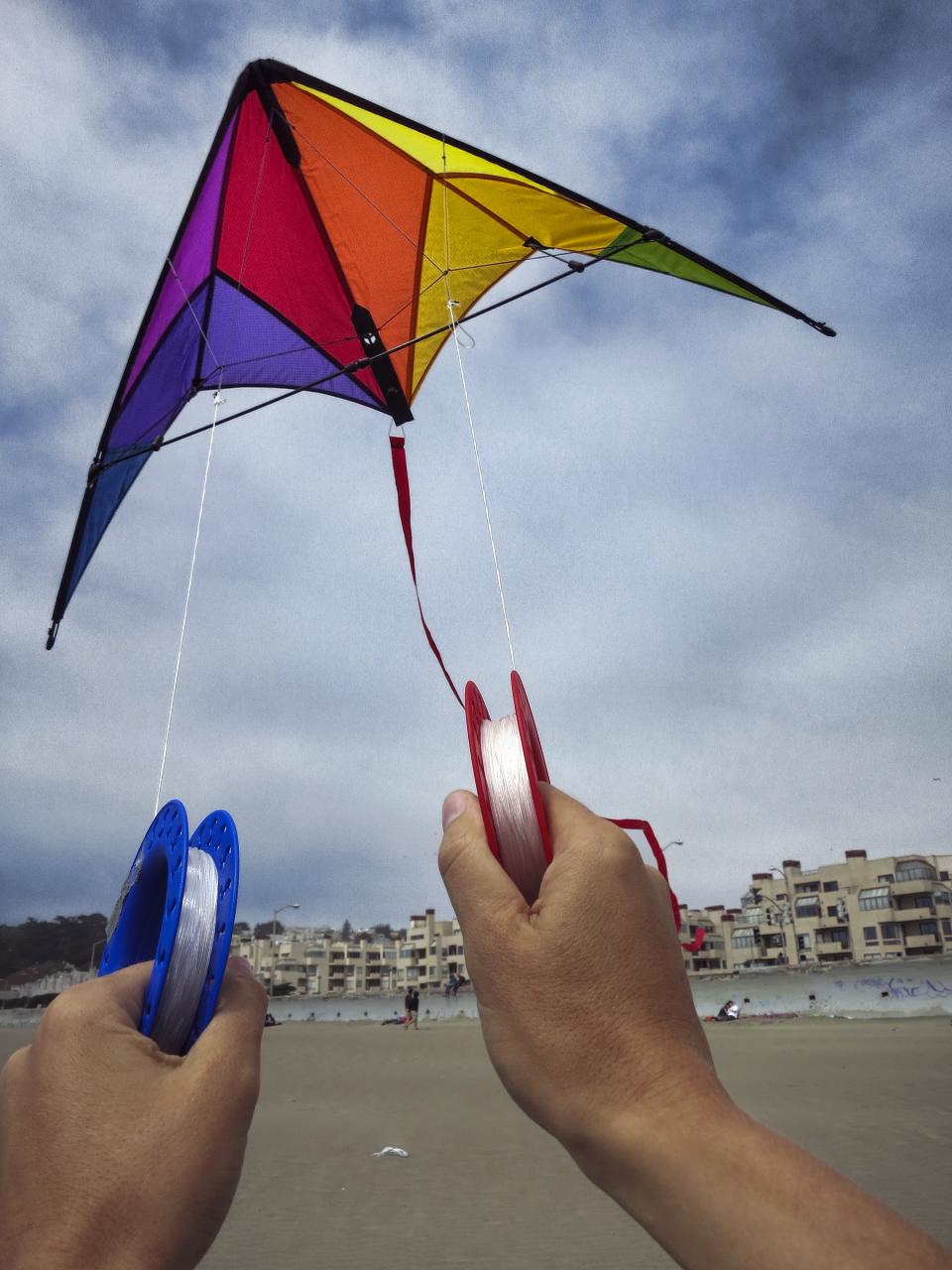
A first-person view of flying a delta kite

Known for their stable flight characteristics, delta kites maintain a steep angle of flight and exhibit superior stability in variable or gusty winds compared with other kite types. Delta kites are popular due to their ability to fly at unusually steep angles in lighter winds than many traditional kite designs. They are easily assembled and can be rolled into a compact form for transport. Owing to the absence of a rigid joint at the nose, the wing spars are able to move independently, producing a self-correcting steering effect that allows the kite to respond smoothly to shifting air currents. Larger delta kites are generally recommended for experienced flyers, as they require appropriately rated flying lines and careful handling under varying wind conditions. In moderate to strong winds, even a delta kite can generate considerable pull when scaled to larger sizes. While this characteristic may present challenges for beginners, it also makes larger delta kites well suited for carrying long tails, windsocks, or suspended inflatable displays, particularly at kite festivals and public exhibitions.

The flexible wings adjust dynamically to changes in wind strength, in a manner often compared to the flight of gliding birds. Compared with conventional kites, delta kites provide a more interactive flying experience. Whereas many traditional kites are largely restricted to vertical movement within a single plane, delta kites offer greater controllability, enabling lateral movement and effective use of a broader, three-dimensional airspace. Delta kites may become unstable or sustain damage if flown outside their intended wind range. Optimal performance is achieved in winds that provide sufficient lift without excessive force. As with other kite types, appropriate matching of kite size and design to prevailing wind conditions is essential, with lighter-wind kites used in gentle breezes and stronger-built models reserved for moderate to strong winds.

Light-wind delta kites are capable of sustained flight in thermal lift, in a manner similar to soaring birds or hang gliders. Skilled pilots may exploit rising warm air by adjusting line length, allowing the kite to gain altitude even in the absence of steady wind, enabling extended flight when other kite types are unable to remain airborne. Delta kites typically operate across a broad wind range of approximately 5–20 mph (10–30 km/h). Small to standard-sized delta kites are well suited to novice flyers, while larger variants – around 6 feet (2 m) in width and above – are often used for carrying multiple tails or other line-mounted decorations.

=== Records ===
Richard Crawford, a high altitude flyer from the US, made an attempt on the world single kite altitude record using a 220 lb (100 kilograms) test, Technora line manufactured by Twinline. He reported that he flew a delta kite to approximately 6,500 feet (1,981 m) in September 2008.

The single-kite altitude world record is held by a triangular-box delta kite. On 23 September 2014, a team led by Robert Moore flew a 129 square feet (12 m^{2}) kite to 16,009 feet (4,880 m) above ground level. The record was achieved after eight series of attempts spanning ten years from a remote site in western New South Wales, Australia. The Dunton-Taylor delta kite, measuring 9.2 feet (3 m) in height and 19.6 feet (6 m) in width, was flown using a winch system and 40,682 feet (12,400 m) of ultra-high-strength Dyneema line. The round-trip flight lasted approximately eight hours. Altitude measurements were recorded using on-board GPS telemetry that transmitted positional data in real time to a ground-based computer, with additional GPS data loggers serving as backups for subsequent analysis.

== See also ==
- Diamond kite
