= William Abner Eddy =

American accountant and journalist

William Abner Eddy, circa 1890

William Abner Eddy (January 28, 1850 – December 26, 1909) was an American accountant and journalist famous for his photographic and meteorological experiments with kites. The scientific significance of Eddy's improvements to kite-flying was short-lived, due to the advent of Lawrence Hargrave's rectangular box kites. Nevertheless, in the year following Eddy's death, a train of ten Eddy kites reaching an altitude of 23,385 feet (7,128 m) set a height record for several years.

== Biography ==
=== Early years ===
William A. Eddy was born to a wealthy family in New York City. His father was a Baptist clergyman. William's experience with kites started at an early age: When he was 15, he successfully tied a lantern to a hexagonal kite. After graduation from the University of Chicago he returned to New York, where he would soon work as an accountant for the New York Herald.

=== Kites ===
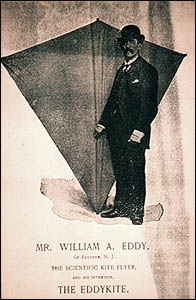
William Eddy with Eddy kite. "Of Bayonne, N.J. / The Scientific Kite Flyer."

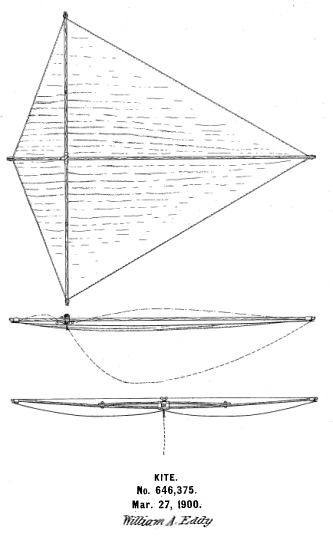
US646375 Willian A. Eddy kite patent image, March 27, 1900

It seems that Eddy's interest in kites was renewed when he learned about recent advances. In 1883, Douglas Archibald used kites to measure differences in wind velocity. Alexander McAdie repeated Benjamin Franklin's kite experiments with an electrometer. In 1887, Eddy heard of Woodbridge Davis' maneuverable kites. Based on accounts of tailless diamond kites common in Java, he tried to fill in the missing details. In standard diamond kites the tail was needed for stabilization, but was problematic when chaining several kites in order to reach higher altitudes. He added a bow in the cross spar and a hole at the crossing of the sticks.

In 1893, the World's Columbian Exposition gave him the chance to acquire an authentic Malay kite, which inspired further improvements and led to what is now known as the diamond Eddy kite. He also improved the method for chaining several kites. Previously each kite had been tied to the previous one. Instead, he made the individual kites' lines branch off a common main line.

Eddy's publication of air temperatures measured with his kites attracted the attention of the American Meteorological Society. In 1894, he followed an invitation to assist the work of Blue Hill Meteorological Observatory. He solved the observatory's technical problems, thereby contributing significantly to its reputation.

On May 30, 1895, Eddy took the first aerial photograph in the Americas. This was 37 years after Nadar's first balloon-based photographs and 7 years after Arthur Batut's first kite-based photographs. Eddy improved Batut's technique further, and he even experimented with telephony via kites and with kite-based mirrors.

The New York Times regularly reported on Eddy's curious accidents, plans, and results. For example, in 1897: playing children interfered with his experiments during the night. In 1898, he hoped to assist the navy in the Spanish–American War. On Christmas Day 1900, he found that the wild ducks at the coast were flying at 47 miles per hour (76 km/h) at an altitude of 1,500 feet (460 m). In 1908, Eddy took kite aerial photographs in order to solve the theft of ice cream from his back porch; one photo showed two men eating the lot.

== Personal life ==
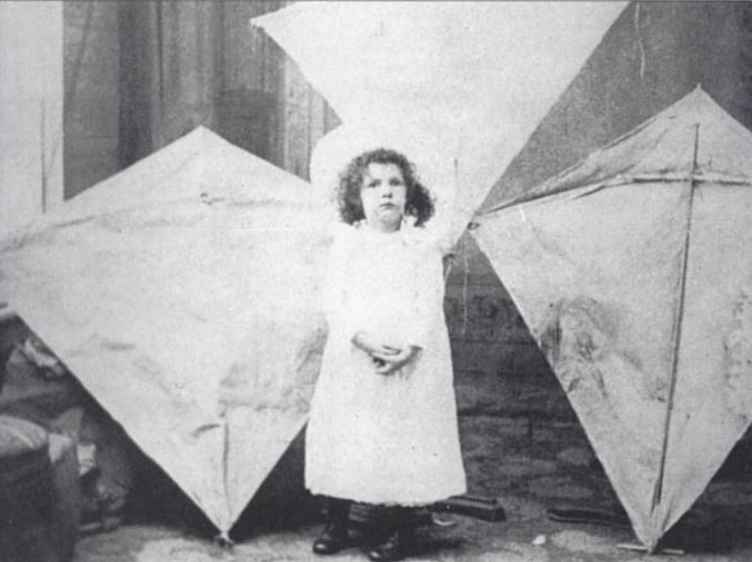
Margaret Eddy with kites, c. 1895

In 1887, he married Cynthia S. Huggins (1856–1922) and moved to nearby Bayonne, New Jersey, where his cousin already lived. Their daughter Margaret was born on January 11, 1888, in New York City. (Note: Margaret married the naturalist Guy Fleming in 1927.)

William Abner Eddy died in Bayonne on December 26, 1909.
