= Gayla Industries =

Gayla Industries, Inc.
- Company type: Private, family-owned
- Industry: Rubber and plastic products
- Founded: 1961
- Headquarters: Houston, Texas, United States
- Number of locations: 1
- Area served: Worldwide
- Key people: Douglas Phillips, President
- Products: Kites, balloons
- Revenue: US$12.1 million
- Number of employees: 85
- Website: www.gaylainc.com

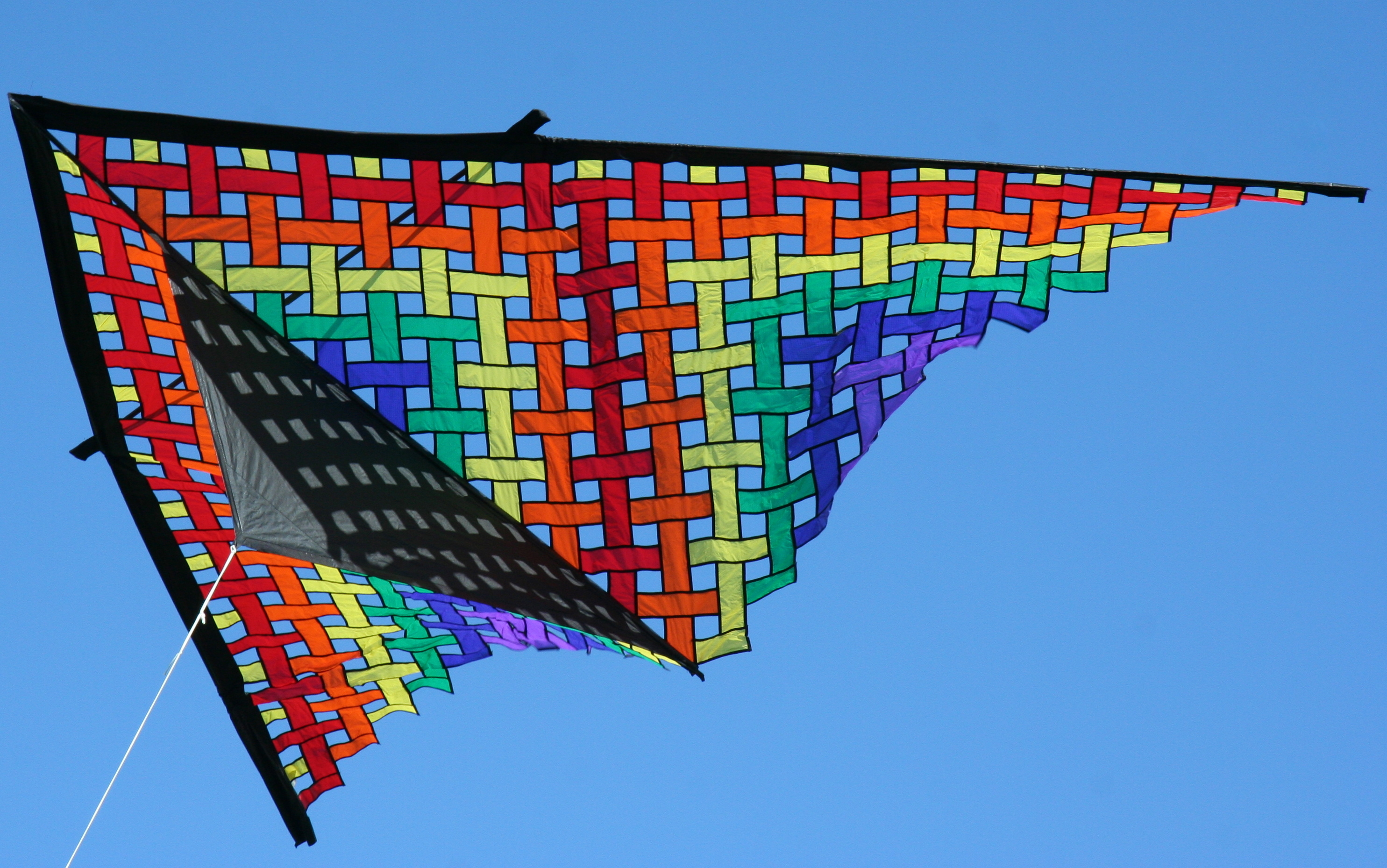
A keel-guided tailless delta wing kite such as those popularized by Gayla Industries

Gayla Industries, Inc. was founded in 1961 primarily as a manufacturer of plastic keel-guided delta-wing kites that require no tails, as well as latex balloons. Their kites are sold worldwide in toy and hobby stores. The company owns several patents on their tail-less keel-guided kite designs.

== Products ==
The company's product line, while remaining primarily plastic kites, has expanded to include rip-stop nylon kites, balloon-based exercise products, flying toys, and wind socks.
