= Rokkaku dako =

Rokkaku kite

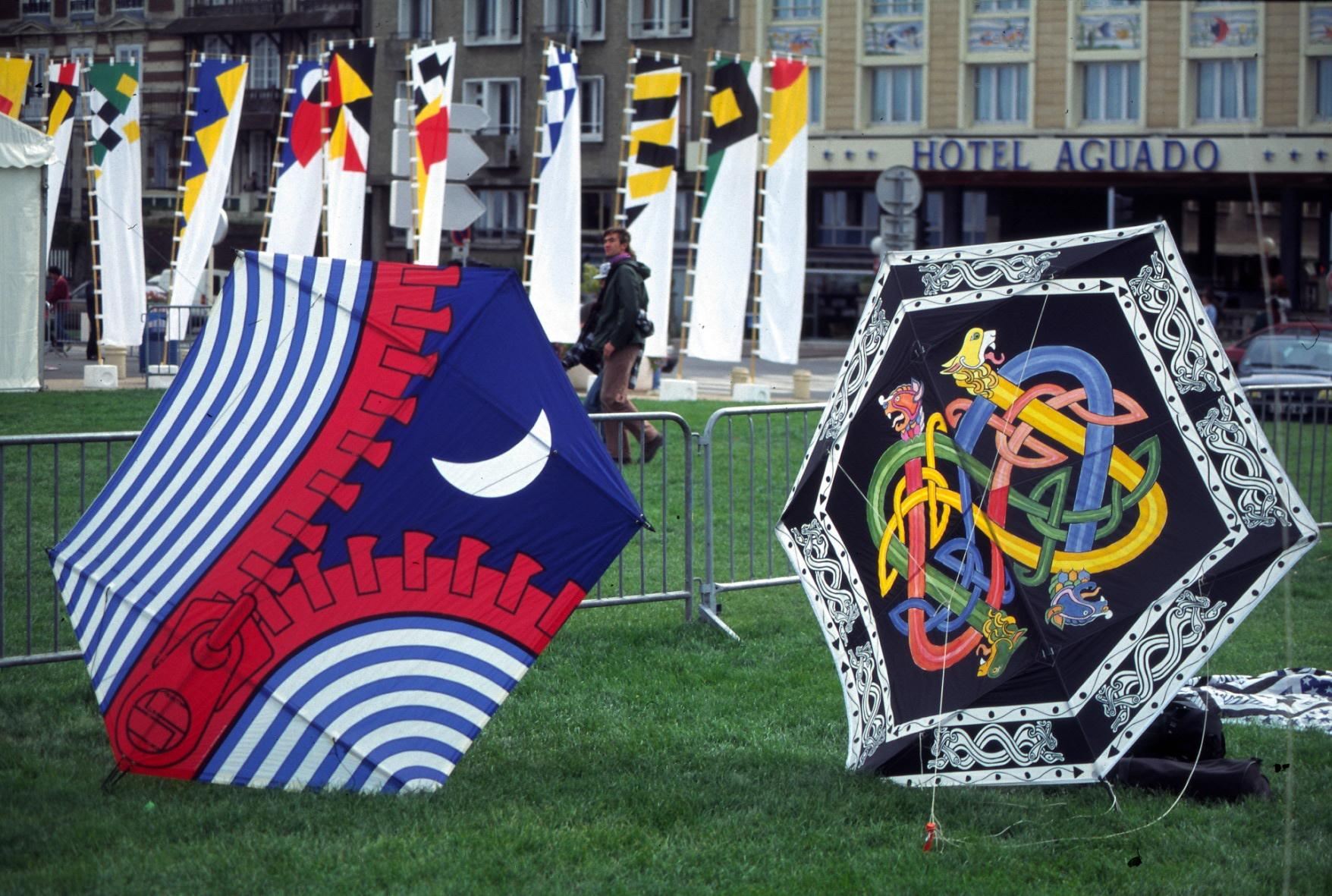
Rokkaku kites in Dieppe.

The Rokkaku dako (六角凧) is a traditional six-sided Japanese fighter kite.

== Construction ==
Traditionally, Rokkaku dako are made from bamboo spars and washi paper. The structure is a vertically stretched hexagon with a four-point bridle. One bamboo runs from tip to toe, and there are two cross-spars.

The rokkaku kite is often hand painted with the face of a famous Samurai. Cows are also often painted on the kites to signify wealth.

== Fighting tactics ==
Flown on a taut string, the kite is stable and rises rapidly. When the line is released, the kite tumbles until tension is put on the line, at which point it takes off in the direction of the spine. Fighting two or more of these kites involves tipping over or destabilizing the opposing kite or cutting its kite line or bridle.

Stability can be increased by bowing the cross spars, making the kite stable enough to fly without a tail.

== Other uses ==
The rokkaku kite is often used for kite aerial photography and in atmospheric science, thanks to its large surface area and simple construction.
