= International Kite Festival in Gujarat – Uttarayan =

Festival in India

International Kite Festival Makar Sankranti
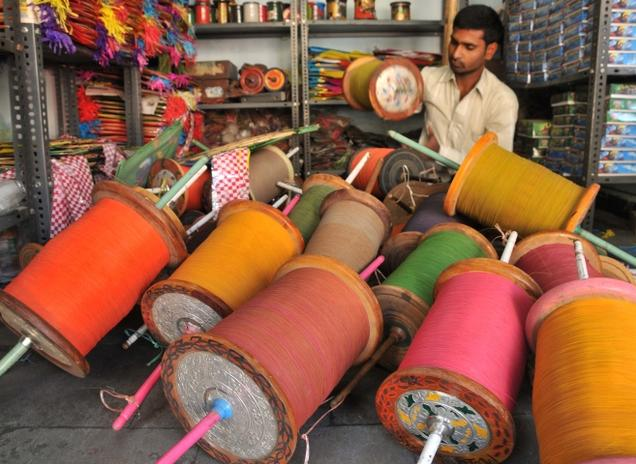
- Manja (the thread with which the kite is flown) maker in a kite market, 13 January 2007
- Genre: kites
- Dates: 14 - 15 January every year
- Frequency: Annually
- Location: India
- Years active: 1989–present
- Website: www.gujarattourism.com

The International Kite Festival, also known as Uttarayan, is an annual two day kite-flying festival held each January in the Indian state of Gujarat to mark the transition of the sun into the Zodiac Capricornus, associated with the Hindu festival of Makara Sankranti. The event marks the end of winter and the beginning of the harvest season. In preparation, many households begin making or purchasing kites several months in advance.

The festival is celebrated throughout Gujarat and in parts of other Indian states. In Gujarat, it is observed as a two-day public holiday. The second day of the celebration is known as Vasi Uttarayan or "Stale" Uttarayan. Traditional foods commonly prepared during the festival include undhiyu, a mixed vegetable dish; chikki, a brittle made from sesame seeds or peanuts and jaggery; and jalebi, a deep-fried sweet. Markets typically see increased activity in the days leading up to the event as people purchase kites, string, and related supplies.

The Government of Gujarat promotes the festival as an international cultural event, inviting kite flyers from around the world to participate. In 2012, the Tourism Corporation of Gujarat mentioned that the International Kite Festival in Gujarat was attempting to be recognized in the Guinness Book of World Records due to the participation of members from 42 countries that year.

== Location ==
The International Kite Festival, Uttarayan, is celebrated in many cities of Gujarat, Telangana and Rajasthan including Ahmedabad, Jaipur, Udaipur, Jodhpur, Surat, Vadodara, Rajkot, Hyderabad, Nadiad, and Dakor. However, the international kite event takes place in Ahmedabad (kite capital of Gujarat), which accommodates visitors from many nations. A popular destination to view the festival is the Sabarmati Riverfront (its Sabarmati river bank has a capacity of over 500,000 people) or the Ahmedabad Police Stadium, where people lie down to see the sky filled with thousands of kites.

During the week leading up to the festival, markets experience a significant increase in kite sales, with large numbers of buyers and sellers trading kites and related supplies. In Ahmedabad, the Raipur Darwaza Patang Bazaar is among the best-known kite markets. During the festival period, it operates continuously, open 24 hours a day, as vendors and customers purchase and negotiate sales in bulk.

== History ==
Kites are believed to have originated in China, where early written records describe their use for military signaling and measurement during the Han dynasty. From East Asia, kite technology spread westward along trade routes such as the Silk Road. Scholars believe that kites reached the Indian subcontinent through contact with Buddhist missionaries and traders traveling between China and South Asia.

Some of the earliest references to kites in Indian literature appear in medieval devotional and poetic works. The thirteenth-century Marathi poet Namdev referred to paper kites as gudi, while sixteenth-century poets such as Dasopant and Eknath used the term vavadi. The Hindi poet Bihari also mentioned kite flying in the Satsai, and the seventeenth-century poet Tulsidas referred to kites in the Ramcharitmanas, where the word chagg is used. These excerpts indicate that kite flying was already a familiar recreational activity across several regions of India by the late medieval period.

During the Mughal era, kite flying developed into a popular pastime and competitive sport, especially among the nobility. Courtly patronage encouraged experimentation with materials and design to improve aerodynamics and maneuverability. Mughal paintings and miniatures depict both men and women participating in kite flying. The historian Abdul Halim Sharar, writing about eighteenth- and nineteenth-century Lucknow, noted that "great care was taken in the construction of a kite. It was composed of tukkals, paper kites, joined together back to front." Sharar also suggested that Hindu participation in kite flying may have been influenced by the custom of lighting akash deep (oil lamps raised into the sky), though this interpretation is debated. During this period, special shapes such as the shield-shaped patang, the lantern-like tukkal, and large effigy-style kites known as chang became common, and the term patang entered widespread usage for fighting kites. It is believed that when Jahangir returned to Delhi in 1812 after spending three years in exile in Allahabad, the people of the city celebrated his homecoming by flying kites, while his mother offered him a chaadar. This historic occasion is now celebrated annually as Phool Waalon ki Sair.

Following the decline of the Mughal empire, kite flying continued as a seasonal and festive activity among the general population. Kite flying has been a regional event in Gujarat for several years. However, the first international festival was celebrated in 1989 when people from all across the globe participated and showcased their innovative kites.

In the 2012 event, the International Kite Festival was inaugurated by Chief Minister Narendra Modi in the presence of Governor Kamla Beniwal.

== Participants ==
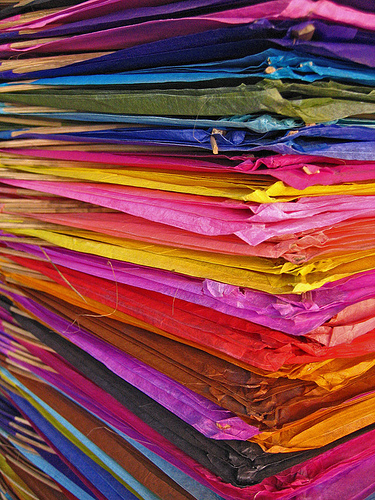
Pile of colored kites, prepared for the Uttarayan festival

The mention of this festival is in the Rigveda which dates back more than 5000 years. The day marks the beginning of the auspicious six-month period known as Uttarayana. Today, regardless of people's background or beliefs, they are welcome to fly kites with everyone else in Gujarat in January. Most visitors arrive from around India, from Gujarat itself or another state. In major cities of Gujarat, kite flying starts as early as 5 am and goes until late at night. Approximately 8-10 million people participate in the festival.

However, many visitors come from around the world, from countries including Japan, Italy, UK, Canada, Brazil, Indonesia, Australia, the US, Malaysia, Singapore, France, and China to take part in the celebration.

The festival has been strongly influenced by its international participants in recent events, for instance:

- Malaysia brought wau-balang kites.
- Indonesia brought llayang-llayanghave.
- The US brought giant banner kites.
- Japan brought Rokkaku fighting kites.
- Italy brought Italian sculptural kites.
- Chinese brought flying dragon kites.
- For other kites, see list of Kite types.

This festival is also an occasion for many public entities such as famous dancers, singers, actors, celebrities or politicians who make an appearance and entertain the population. In 2004, for example, the (Bollywood) actress Juhi Chawla was part of the celebration and performed a garba dance, which is very popular in India.

== Types of kites ==
During the event, kite markets are set up alongside food stalls and performers. They are usually made with materials such as plastic, leaves, wood, metal, nylon and other scrap materials, but the ones for Uttarayan are made of light-weight paper and bamboo, and are mostly rhombus shaped with a central spine and a single bow. Dye and paint are also added to increase the glamour of the kite. The lines are covered with mixtures of glue and ground glass which, when dried, rolled up and attached to the rear, also known as firkees, become sharp enough to cut skin. These types of sharp lines are used on fighter kites, known in India as patangs, to cut down other kites during kite fighting events.

On the second night of the festival, illuminated kites filled with lights and candles known as tukals or tukkals are launched, creating a spectacle in the dark sky.

== See also ==
- List of Kite festivals
- Hamamatsu Kite Festival
- Weifang International Kite Festival
- Blossom Kite Festival
- Bali Kite Festival
- Bristol International Kite Festival
