= John Barresi =

American kite flier

Personal information
- Born: June 1, 1975 (age 51) United States
- Occupations: Kite Performer, Kite Designer, Editor/Owner of Kitelife Magazine, Owner of Kite Forge.
- Years active: 1990-present
- Website: johnbarresi.com

John Barresi (born June 1, 1975) is an American sport kite flier, kite designer, editor and owner of KiteLife magazine and KiteLife.com since 2002, leader of Team KiteLife performance team, and owner of Kite Forge design company.

== Career ==
One of the most prolific currently active sport kite fliers in the world, Barresi started in the kiting community as an enthusiast in August 1990. He started at a competitive level in 1991 and has since secured top rankings in a variety of sport kite disciplines (individual, pairs, team, dual line, quad line, indoor) in international competitions and in demonstrations as an invited performer. He has served several roles at kiting organizations including President of the American Kitefliers Association, board member of Kite Trade Association International, and as a judge at competitions held around the globe.

In 2003, Barresi became the sole owner of KiteLife Magazine. The magazine continued in circulation through 2014, the website remains active with discussion boards, prize drawings, and live chat.

Attending the 2006 World Sport Kite Championships in Berck sur Mer France as a judge, he participated in organized quad line team flying for the first time and impassioned by his experiences there, formed Team iQuad with friend David Hathaway immediately upon returning to the United States. The team quickly gained popularity and by 2008 was invited to events around the world. Team iQuad would go on to win industry awards for promoting the sport globally. Over the seven years the team performed, they included at least 16 regular members with additional guest stars and fill-in performers. The group disbanded in September 2013 with their final performance at the Antelope Island Stampede Festival.

In 2008, Barresi was the youngest recipient of the American Kitefliers Association Lifetime Achievement Award.

In 2016, Barresi formed a new team called Team KiteLife or TKL, with additional founding members Scott Benz, Brett Marchel, and Eli Russell. Pilots added to the team include Jeremy Wharton (2019), Sara Russell (2020), Sari Becker (2020), Jim Doman (2022), Meshelle Sharples (2022) and Geoff Hutton (2022). The team has flown at events across the United States and Europe.

In 2017, Barresi launched a company called Kite Forge, initially featuring a single dual line kite with promises to expand to new kites in the future. The company has expanded to sell multiple kite designs, kite parts, and kite apparel.

On August 23, 2019 at the Washington State International Kite Festival, he led a world record group of 101 quad line kites in team formation as the team captain, beating his own previous records of 81 quad line kites in team formation set in 2013 and another of 64 set in 2010.

In 2022, Barresi and Meshelle Sharples started the pairs team Windfall, announced at the same time Sharples joined Team KiteLife. The pair's debut performance was at the South Padre Island Kite Fest.

Barresi's award-winning kite designs include the Djinn, the Revolution B-Series, the Kymera, and the Kaiju.

== National Competitions ==
Year	Championship Title	Place	Team	Competition Organizer	Location
1992	Experienced Individual Ballet	1		American Kite Magazine Circuit	
1992	Experienced Individual Precision	1		American Kite Magazine Circuit	
1993	Open Quadline Ballet	1		American Kitefliers Association Grand Nationals	Seaside, Oregon
1994	Open Quadline Ballet	1		American Kite Magazine Circuit	
1994	Open Quadline Ballet	1		American Kitefliers Association Grand Nationals	Wildwood, New Jersey
1996	Masters Team Precision	1	Captain Eddie's Flying Circus	American Kitefliers Association Grand Nationals	Santa Monica, California
1996	Masters Individual Ballet H1	5		American Kitefliers Association Grand Nationals	Santa Monica, California
1996	Masters Individual Quadline Ballet	6		American Kitefliers Association Grand Nationals	Santa Monica, California
1997	Masters Individual Ballet	1		American Kite Magazine Circuit	
1997	Masters Quadline Ballet	1		American Kite Magazine Circuit	
1997	Masters Team Ballet	1	Captain Eddie's Flying Circus	American Kite Magazine Circuit	
1997	Masters Team Precision	1	Captain Eddie's Flying Circus	American Kite Magazine Circuit	
1997	Master Individual Precision	7		American Kitefliers Association Grand Nationals	Wildwood, New Jersey
1997	Master Individual Ballet	8		American Kitefliers Association Grand Nationals	Wildwood, New Jersey
1997	Master Individual Quad Ballet	4		American Kitefliers Association Grand Nationals	Wildwood, New Jersey
2002	Masters Individual Quad Ballet	2		American Kitefliers Association Grand Nationals	Ocean City, Maryland
2002	Masters Masters Individual Ballet	3		American Kitefliers Association Grand Nationals	Ocean City, Maryland
2002	Masters Masters Individual Precision	11		American Kitefliers Association Grand Nationals	Ocean City, Maryland
2002	Masters Individual Quad Precision	2		American Kitefliers Association Grand Nationals	Ocean City, Maryland
2004	Masters Individual Multi-line Ballet	1		American Kitefliers Association Grand Nationals	Seaside, Oregon
2004	Masters Individual Multi-line Precision	1		American Kitefliers Association Grand Nationals	Seaside, Oregon
2005	Masters Individual Quad Precision	1		American Kitefliers Association Grand Nationals	Ocean City, Maryland
2005	Masters Individual Ballet	1		American Kitefliers Association Grand Nationals	Ocean City, Maryland
2005	Experienced Team Ballet	1	TKS Mid-Air	American Kitefliers Association Grand Nationals	Ocean City, Maryland
2005	Experienced Team Precision	1	TKS Mid-Air	American Kitefliers Association Grand Nationals	Ocean City, Maryland
2005	Masters Individual Quad Ballet	4		American Kitefliers Association Grand Nationals	Ocean City, Maryland
2005	Open Individual Free Style	2		American Kitefliers Association Grand Nationals	Ocean City, Maryland
2006	Masters Individual Dual-line Ballet	7		American Kitefliers Association Grand Nationals	Des Moines, Iowa
2006	Masters Individual Dual-line Precision	3		American Kitefliers Association Grand Nationals	Des Moines, Iowa
2006	Masters Individual Multi-line Ballet	2		American Kitefliers Association Grand Nationals	Des Moines, Iowa
2006	Masters Individual Multi-line Precision	1		American Kitefliers Association Grand Nationals	Des Moines, Iowa
2006	Open Individual Outdoor Unlimited	1		American Kitefliers Association Grand Nationals	Des Moines, Iowa
2006	Open Individual Indoor Unlimited Ballet	7		American Kitefliers Association Grand Nationals	Des Moines, Iowa
2007	Masters Individual Dual-line Ballet	5		American Kitefliers Association Grand Nationals	Ocean Shores, Washington
2007	Masters Individual Dual-line Precision	6		American Kitefliers Association Grand Nationals	Ocean Shores, Washington
2007	Masters Individual Multi-line Ballet	1		American Kitefliers Association Grand Nationals	Ocean Shores, Washington
2007	Masters Individual Multi-line Precision	1		American Kitefliers Association Grand Nationals	Ocean Shores, Washington
2007	Open Individual Indoor Unlimited Ballet	2		American Kitefliers Association Grand Nationals	Ocean Shores, Washington
2008	Masters Individual Multi-line Ballet	2		American Kitefliers Association Grand Nationals	Gettysburg, Pennsylvania
2008	Masters Individual Multi-line Precision	2		American Kitefliers Association Grand Nationals	Gettysburg, Pennsylvania
2008	Open Pairs Multi-line Ballet	2	Furious George	American Kitefliers Association Grand Nationals	Gettysburg, Pennsylvania
2008	Open Pairs Multi-line Precision	1	Furious George	American Kitefliers Association Grand Nationals	Gettysburg, Pennsylvania
2012	Open Individual Indoor Unlimited	1		American Kitefliers Association Grand Nationals	Enid, Oklahoma
2013	Masters Individual Multi-line Ballet	1		American Kitefliers Association Grand Nationals	Seaside, Oregon
2013	Masters Individual Multi-line Precision	1		American Kitefliers Association Grand Nationals	Seaside, Oregon
2013	Masters Pairs Multi-line Ballet	1	REVOL	American Kitefliers Association Grand Nationals	Seaside, Oregon
2013	Masters Pairs Multi-line Precision	1	REVOL	American Kitefliers Association Grand Nationals	Seaside, Oregon
2013	Open Indoor Precision	2		American Kitefliers Association Grand Nationals	Seaside, Oregon
2018	Masters Individual Multi-line Ballet	1		American Kitefliers Association Grand Nationals	Shreveport, Louisiana
2018	Masters Individual Multi-line Precision	1		American Kitefliers Association Grand Nationals	Shreveport, Louisiana
2018	Masters Individual Ballet	1		American Kitefliers Association Grand Nationals	Shreveport, Louisiana
2018	Masters Individual Precision	1		American Kitefliers Association Grand Nationals	Shreveport, Louisiana
2018	Open Indoor Unlimited	1		American Kitefliers Association Grand Nationals	Shreveport, Louisiana

Teams in 1993, 1995, and 1997 represented the US in the bi-annual Sport Team and Competitive Kiting (STACK) World Cup.

As part of the US Sport Kite Team in the 2025 World Kite Cup held in Wuhan, China, presented by the China Kite Sports Association, 2nd place on individual quadline ballet.

== Kite designs ==
In 2007 Barresi partnered with Revolution Kites to design the Revolution B-Series, a "signature series" quad line kite. The kite won many awards and quickly became the standard for quad line kite pilots around the globe. The model was discontinued on January 1, 2017.

In June 2011 working with Into The Wind, Barresi released the Kymera, a dual line stunt kite. The model was discontinued in 2018.

In September 2017, Barresi announced his founding a kite company Kite Forge and its inaugural kite, the Kaiju, a dual line kite for indoor flight and light outdoor winds. The Kaiju won Kite Addict Magazine's "most versatile 2 line kite" award for 2018 and Kite Forge was runner up for the kite manufacturer of the year.

In August 2018, Barresi announced the Djinn, a quad line kite, designed by himself and Brett Marchel. The initial design had three models, the Standard (ST), Mid Vent (MV), and Full Vent (VT) for various wind conditions. Despite a short time on the market the kite received many votes in the 2018 Kite Addict survey for best 4 line kite of the year, and runner up as New Kite of the Year. The design won the 2019 Kite Addict New Kite of the Year award. The Extra Vent (XV) and Hardcore Vent (HV) models targeting high wind conditions were added in August 2019, and the Ultralight (UL) model for light wind was added in December 2021. An indoor model, the Djinndoor, was added in October 2022.

In July 2024, Barresi announced the Djuice, a quad line kite, designed by himself and Brett Marchel. The design launched with Standard (ST) and Vented (VT) models. The 7 panel design was stated to be less expensive to manufacture than the Djinn, while incorporating many of the design features like the Sync Bridle, wear strips, smooth leading edge, and notched outer trailing edge. This design was priced at roughly half the cost of the Djinn, sold the option of a ready-to-fly kit with lines and handles, and was price competitive with other beginner-focused products on the market.
