= List of kite festivals =

This is a list of kite festivals.

== Annual kite festivals ==
Initial Year	Season	Month	Day(s)	Event name	Last years attendance	Continent	Country	Region	City	Venue	Notes	Website
1929	Spring	March		Zilker Annual Kite Festival	30,000	North America	United States	Southwestern United States	Austin, TX	Zilker Park	Oldest continuously operating kite festival.	http://www.abckitefestival.com
1967	Spring	March or April	Last Saturday of March or first Saturday of April	Blossom Kite Festival (formerly Smithsonian Kite Festival)		North America	United States	Eastern United States	Washington, D.C.	National Mall	National Cherry Blossom Festival	https://nationalcherryblossomfestival.org/event/blossom-kite-festival/
1969	Spring	May	Third Saturday	Franklin Park Kite and Bike Festival (Formerly Great Boston Kite Festival)		North America	United States	Northeastern	Boston, Massachusetts	Franklin Park		
1977	Autumn	September	Second Sunday	Bondi Beach Festival of the Winds	40,000	Australia	Australia	NSW	Sydney	Bondi Beach		
1978	Summer	September	First weekend after Labor Day	Frank Mots International Kite Festival	60,000	North America	United States	Midwest	Milwaukee, Wisconsin	Veteran's Park	Coordinated by the Kite Society of Wisconsin and Illinois with Gift of Wings	http://www.giftofwings.com/cgi-bin/SoftCart.exe/events/frankmots/index.html?L+mystore1+yqfj3562ff7d0f7d+1400875708 Frank Mots International Kite Festival
1979		October		Bali Kite Festival		Asia	Indonesia	Bali	Denpasar	Padang Galak beach, Sanur		
1984	Spring	April	Third weekend	Weifang International Kite Festival		Asia	China	Shandong Province	Weifang	Binhai beach		http://www.weifangkitefestival.com/
1986	Spring	April	9 days	Berck Sur Mer International Kite Festival	700,000	Europe	France	Pas de Calais	Berck Sur Mer	Berck Sur Mer beach		http://www.cerf-volant-berck.com/
1986	Summer	July	Second weekend of July	Newport Kite Festival	30,000	North America	United States	Northeastern United States	Newport, RI	Brenton Point State Park		https://www.newportkitefestival.com
1986				Berkeley Kite Festival		North America	United States	South-Western United States	Berkeley, California	Cesar Chavez park Berkeley Marina	Festival ended in 2022 citing permit costs.	
1986		September		Bristol International Kite Festival	30,000	Europe	England	North Somerset	Bristol	Ashton Court estate		
1989		January	14-15	International Kite Festival India	500,000	Asia	India	Gujarat	Ahmedabad	Sabarmati River Front @ Ashram Road		
1991	Summer	August		Portsmouth International Kite Festival		Europe	United Kingdom	South East England	Portsmouth, Hampshire County	Southsea Common	Listed as one of the 23 biggest kite festivals in the world	http://www.portsmouthkitefestival.org.uk/
1996		August	Third weekend	Washington State International Kite Festival	100,000	North America	United States	Washington (state)	Long Beach, Washington	Long Beach		http://kitefestival.com/
1999	Autumn	April	Usually close to Easter	Festival of the Wind		Australia	Australia	Central Queensland	Emu Park, Queensland	Fisherman's Beach	Local Lions Club event, organised as an alcohol-free family day with free entry	https://www.festivalofthewind.com/
2001	Winter	February	Third Saturday	Color the Wind	7,500	North America	United States	Midwestern United States	Clear Lake, Iowa		Largest Winter kite festival in the Midwest, held on the frozen waters of a 3600-acre lake.	http://www.colorthewind.org
2001	Winter	January		Windless Kite Festival		North America	United States	North-western United States	Long Beach, Washington	Long Beach School Gymnasium, and virtual online	Indoor kite festival with an additional virtual online event	https://www.worldkitemuseum.com/key-events/windless-kite-festival/ and Official Facebook group
2004				Windscape Kite Festival		North America	Canada	Western Canada	Swift Current	Marston Street and 11th Avenue SW		
2005	Spring	April or May	Weekend, typically scheduled around school summer break	Kite Fest Louisiane	15,000	North America	United States	Southwestern United States	Port Allen, LA	West Baton Rouge Soccer Complex	Community fly and assorted venders and free booths. 3 teams (Go Big or Go Home with show kites, Riders with quad line, Austin End of the Line with dual line), indoor demos, plus fireworks and LED kites one night of the event.	https://westbatonrouge.net/kite-fest-louisiane/
2006	Summer	August	Labor Day Weekend	Kites Over Lake Michigan	30,000	North America	United States	Midwestern United States	Two Rivers, Wisconsin		Largest summer kite festival in the Midwest. Held along Lake Michigan.	http://www.uniqueflyingobjects.com/index.php?main_page=index&cPath=116
2008				NTUC Income Kite Festival Singapore	250,000	Asia	Singapore		Singapore	The Promontory @ Marina Bay		
2010				Dieppe Kite International	30,000	North America	Canada	Atlantic Canada	Dieppe	Dover Park		
2012	Summer	January		Jeevan Kite & River Festival, Guwahati		Asia	India	Assam	Lower Assam	Guwahati		
2014	Summer	March	March	Festival de pipas de Osasco		South America	Brazil	Southern Brazil	Osasco, São Paulo state			

== See also ==
- Sport kite
- Kite
