= Kitelife =

KiteLife (KL) was an American magazine devoted to kites. The magazine was in circulation between 1998 and 2014. The magazine is no longer in circulation but the website remains active with both free access and paid accounts. It hosts archives of every magazine issue, archives of several other kite-related publications including Kite Lines Magazine and Stunt Kite Quarterly, a collection kite videos and tutorials, and an active discussion board.

== Creation ==
Founded in 1998 by Mike Gillard of Ohio, KiteLife Magazine was the first on-line publication 100% devoted to the sport of kite flying and its community. Featuring articles, reviews and interviews with notable kite fliers, Kitelife offered a wealth of kiting information and entertainment during a time when there were no other kite publications available. Building on the ideas and vision carried by such out-of-print kiting publications as Stunt Kite Quarterly, Kite Lines, American Kite Magazine and Kite Passion, Gillard published bi-monthly issues of Kitelife Magazine until the business changed ownership a few years later.

== John Barresi ==
In January 2003, John Barresi became the sole owner of KiteLife. Having spent the 1997 sport kite season flying together on the Captain Eddie's Flying Circus sport kite team, Barresi shared the same desire to contribute to kiting through promotion, education and stimulation in his role as Webmaster of Kitelife. With Gillard's taking over the editorship of the American Kitefliers Association Kiting Magazine in recent years, Barresi assumed full ownership effective August 1, 2003.

John's history in kiting began in 1990 when he started flying recreationally in San Francisco, then went on to become a competitor on the national AKA and American Kite Magazine competition circuits... Since then, his experience expanded to include roles on three national championship sport kite teams, roughly 20 individual national championships, positions on several AKA committees and sub-committees, service as a board member on the Kite Trade Association's board of directors, judge at the 2006 World Sport Kite Championships, member of the 2007/2008 Red Bull Kite Performers team, founder of the RevGuild kite club and many other exploits, all of which have contributed to the wide variety of contacts, resources and material that drives Kitelife today.

== Expansion ==
KiteLife expanded its realm of content very quickly with the gradual addition of what is now the largest single video collection of sport kite performances found anywhere on the World Wide Web, as well as a wide variety of Video Tutorials for sport kite pilots. Additionally, a discussion forum and photo gallery were added.

KiteLife went on to secure permission to reproduce some out of print magazines into PDF format so that it would again be accessible to the general public, free of charge. Publishers Valerie Govig of Kite Lines and Susan Batdorff of Stunt Kite Quarterly understood the historical value and agreed to share their creations with the world through KiteLife. It also contained complete archives of Kite Lines Magazine, which was published 1977 through 2000.

KiteLife serviced thousands of visitors every month and supports itself through the contributions of advertisers and subscription fees, as well as extensive involvement in web design for many of the top businesses and organizations in kiting. Although the main bulk of the content is free by principle, visitors are still encouraged to subscribe for additional features and the knowledge they are supporting a worthwhile cause.

The organization is the titular sponsor of Team Kitelife or TKL, a performance sport kite team organized in 2016. As of 2023 the team has expanded to 10 members.
