= World Kite Museum =

Museum in Long Beach, Washington, USA

- Established: August 21, 1990
- Location: 303 Sid Snyder Drive, Long Beach, Washington, US
- Coordinates: 46°20′44″N 124°03′28″W
- Type: Art museum, especially kite art
- Website: worldkitemuseum.com

The World Kite Museum is a museum in Long Beach, Washington, United States. It first opened as a permanent location on August 21, 1990, in a converted beach cottage acquired by the city. It opened with a collection of over 700 kites, exhibiting Japanese, Chinese, and Malaysian kites. It has grown to include galleries and exhibits on rotation with kites, models, and archives from around the world. The American Kitefliers Association combined their archives with the museum's in the late 1990s.

== History ==
The idea was floated for the museum during the 1980s by a group of kite collectors, and first came to fruition with a week-long temporary exhibition taking place during the 1989 Washington State International Kite Festival. The popularity of this exhibition led to the creation of a permanent site for the museum, proposed by Jim Buesing, with the museum later headed by his wife, Kay Buesing.

The museum was developed in an old cottage, and remained in this building from 1990 to 2004. In 2005, the museum was moved to a larger building on Sid Snyder Drive, where it remains to this day.

== Collection ==
The museum was started due to a donation of over 700 kites by the widow of kite collector David Checkley. This donation included over 300 kites from Japan, and the museum claims to have the most complete collection of Japanese kites outside of Japan.

The collection ranges from modern creations back to antiquity, and has now expanded to hold over 1500 kites from 26 countries.

== Events ==
The museum sponsors and hosts the Washington State International Kite Festival, held annually in the city since 1981. The museum also sponsors the Windless Kite Festival, an indoor kite event held annually since 2001, and the One Sky One World International Kite Fly For Peace event held annually since 1985, in addition to other community events.
