= Ripstop =

Reinforced woven fabric

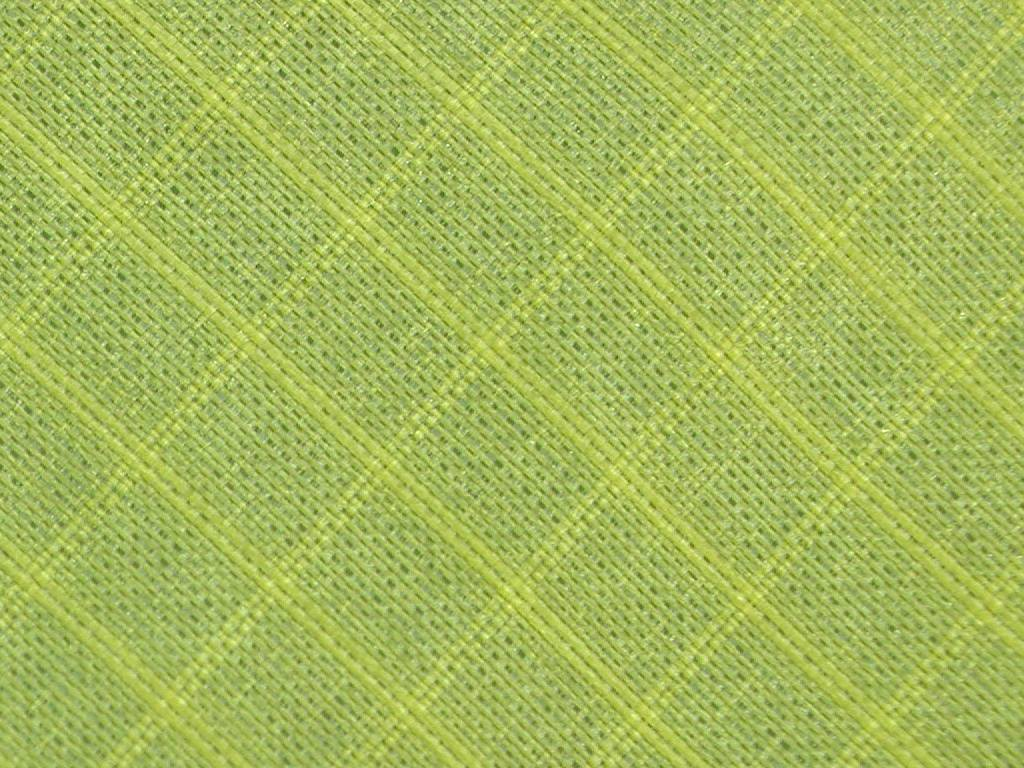
Ripstop fabric

Ripstop is a woven fabric, often made of nylon, using a reinforcing technique that makes it more resistant to tearing and wear. During weaving, stronger (and often thicker) reinforcement yarns are interwoven at regular intervals in a crosshatch pattern. The intervals are typically 5 to 8 millimeters (0.2 to 0.3 in). Thin and lightweight ripstop fabrics have a two-dimensional structure due to the thicker yarns being interwoven in thinner cloth. Older lightweight ripstop fabrics display the thicker interlocking thread patterns in the material quite prominently, but more modern weaving techniques make the ripstop threads less obvious. A similar effect can be achieved by weaving two or three fine yarns together at smaller intervals.

Advantages of ripstop are the favourable strength-to-weight ratio and that small tears can not easily spread (reinforcement yarns stop the ripping of the main fabric, hence the name rip-stop). Fibers used to make ripstop include cotton, silk, polyester, and polypropylene, with nylon content often limited to the crosshatched threads that make it tear-resistant.

== Invention ==
Nylon, a synthetic fiber with inherent elasticity, was developed shortly before World War II by DuPont. Initially used for consumer goods such as stockings and toothbrush bristles, nylon production was shifted entirely for military use, including parachute cloth.

In 1962, a patent for "parachute fabric containing stretch and non-stretch type ripstops" was filed by the U.S. Army.

== Applications ==
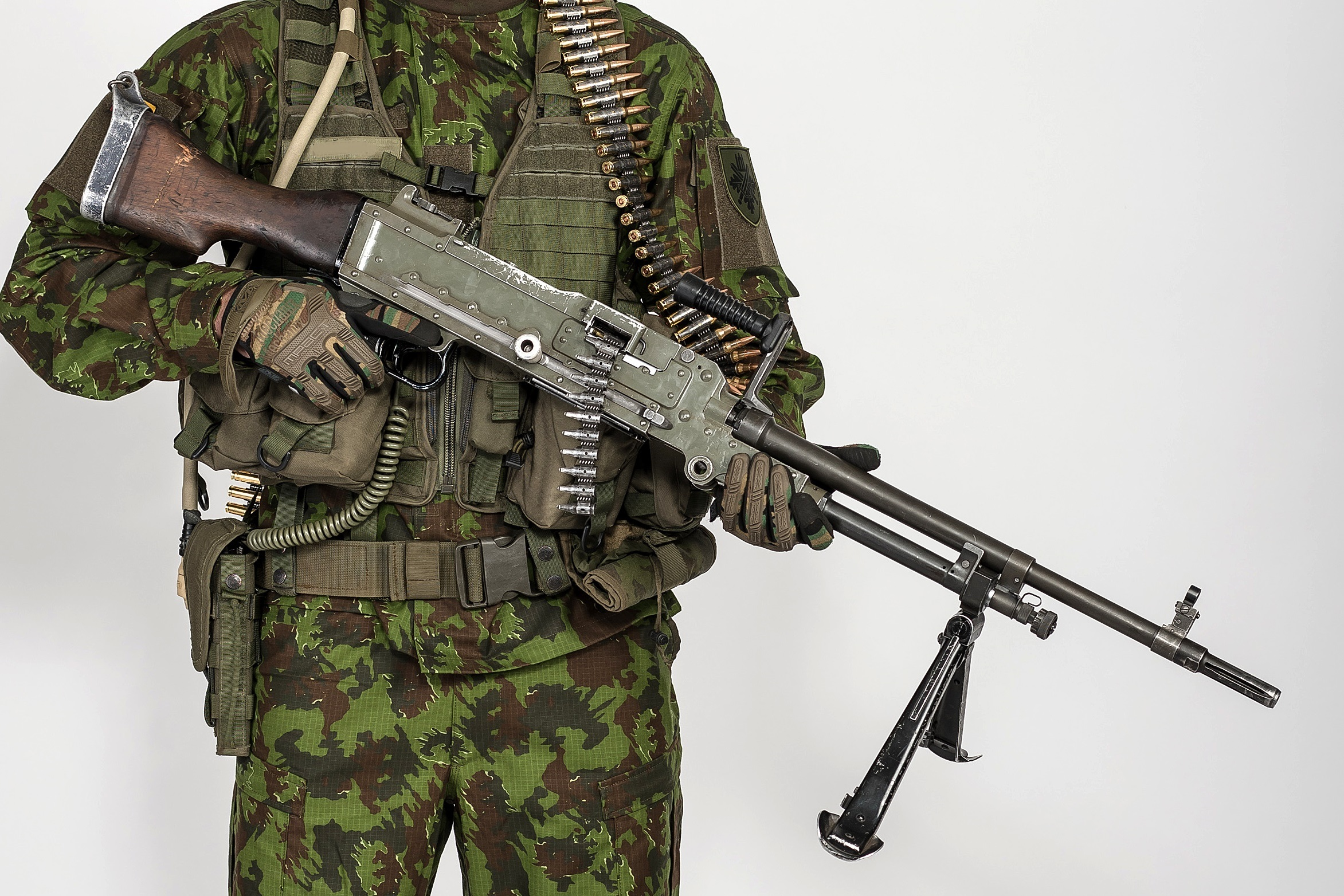
Ripstop used in a combat uniform

Ripstop fabrics are used in outdoor gear such as backpacks, sleeping bags, and tents, luggage, footwear, parachutes, yacht sails, hot air balloons, wingsuits, kites, and hovercraft skirts. Swags, flags, banners, and other applications requiring a strong lightweight fabric use ripstop as well.

Ripstop reinforcements are incorporated into heavier fabrics requiring extreme durability, such as those used in military uniforms and hunting gear, Nomex protective clothing for firefighters and other workwear, and to reduce the wear on fabrics in direct contact with the ground or wind.

Self-adhesive ripstop patches are used to repair other fabrics.

Ejection seat parachutes made with ripstop are woven with an elastic-like fabric so that they stretch to allow more air to pass through at high speed. Then as the ejection seat slows, the weave closes and acts like a conventional parachute. This allows the pilot seat to slow gently, avoiding compression that could result in spinal injury.

== Types ==
=== Nylon ===
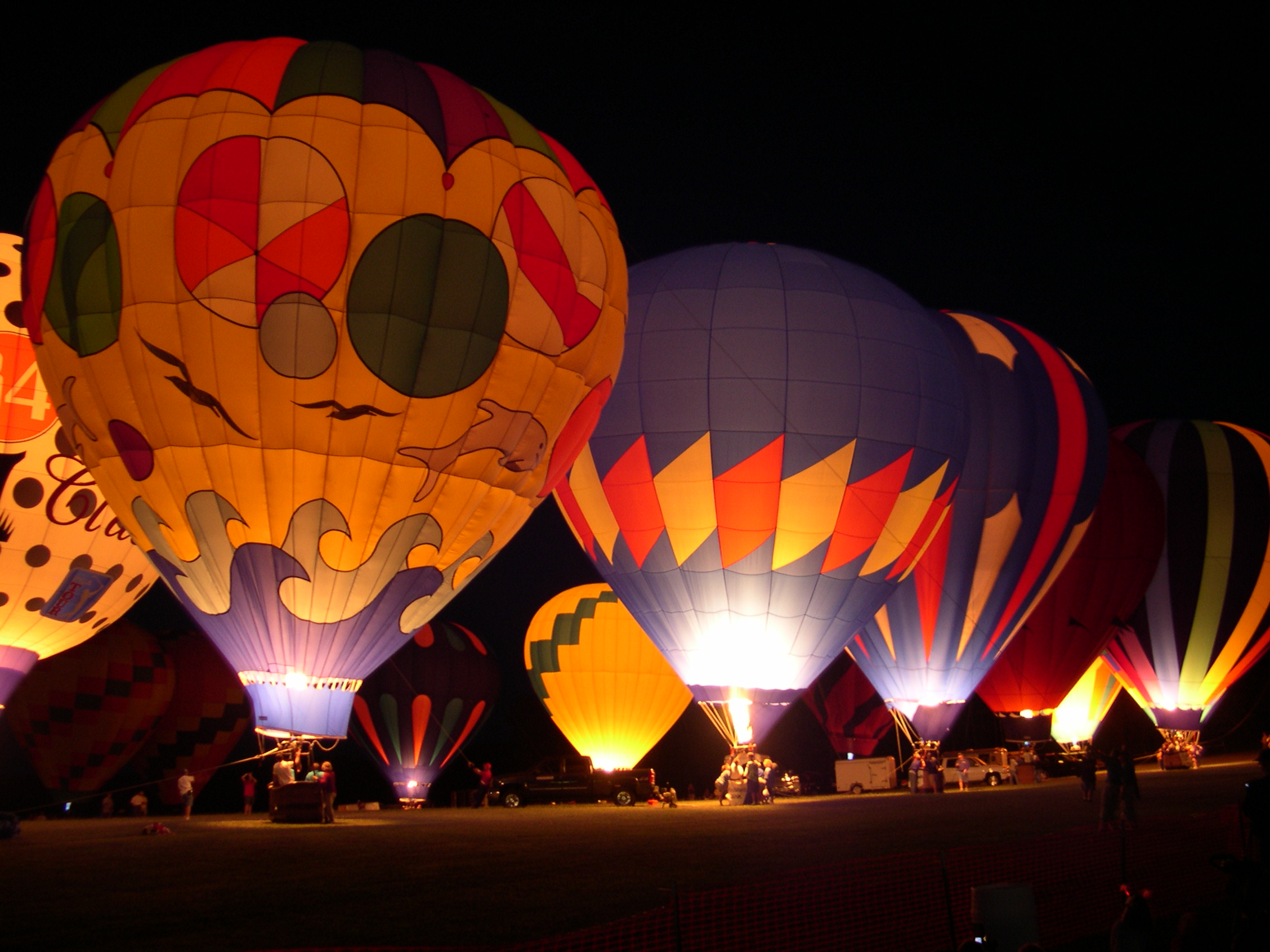
Ripstop nylon is the primary material used in hot air balloons

Ripstop nylon is available in a wide range of colors, sizes, thicknesses, textures, and weave densities (down to zero porosity to wind and water). It also may be made fire-resistant.

=== Polyester ===
Ripstop polyester lacks the inherent elasticity of ripstop nylon. Among its uses are paragliding canopies and stunt kites.

== See also ==
- Ballistic nylon
- Cordura
- Rip-stop doubler, a crack arrestor in structural engineering, using the same principle of reinforcement
