= Paul E. Garber =

American museum head

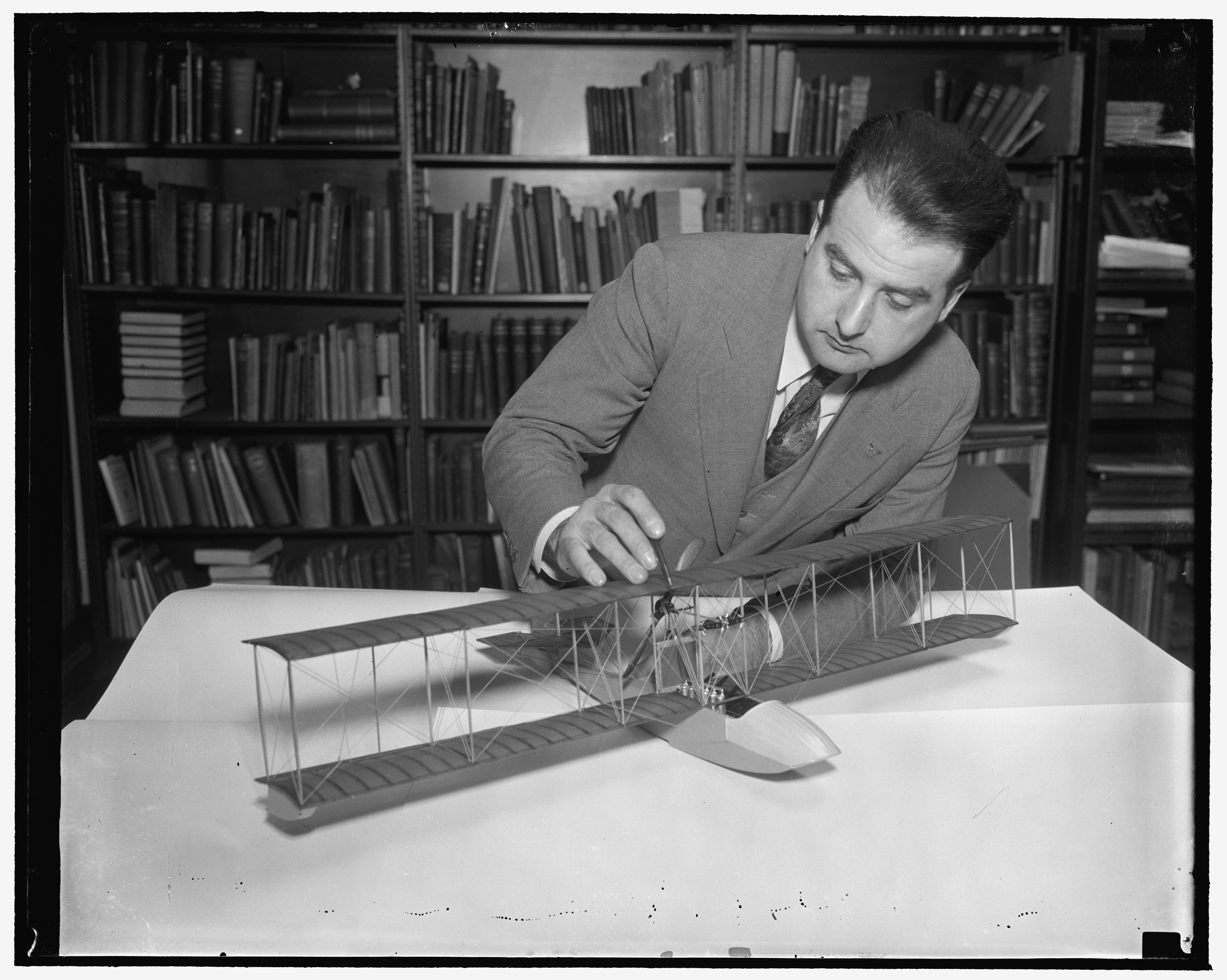
Paul E. Garber in 1938

Paul Edward Garber (August 31, 1899 - September 23, 1992) was the first head of the National Air Museum of the Smithsonian Institution, in Washington, D.C. Through his work and effort, the most complete collection of historical aircraft in the world was gathered and preserved. It contains the sole survivors of many interesting historical aircraft types.

== Biography ==
Garber was born in Atlantic City, New Jersey, but spent his childhood in Washington, D.C., and grew up with clear memories of flight demonstrations by the Wright Brothers at Fort Myer, Virginia in 1909. He joined the Army at age 18 and served as a sergeant during World War I. He was transferred from the D.C. National Guard to the Aviation Service in the U.S. Signal Corps. During World War II he was a commander in the United States Navy and later was in the Navy Reserve.

World War I ended before he started planned flight training. After the war he took a job as a ground crewman and messenger with the U.S. Postal Airmail Service. In 1920 he joined the Smithsonian and for the next 72 years worked for the preservation of the world's aviation heritage.

In 1946 President Harry S. Truman created the National Air Museum as a separate entity of the Smithsonian. Garber played a key role in the process and was assigned as a Curator to the Museum.

The present National Air and Space Museum building opened in 1976. Garber, as first curator and devotee, helped to assemble the most impressive collection of historic aircraft in the world for the Institution.

The storage of that collection was not much of a problem prior to World War II - virtually everything that Garber collected was on display at the Arts and Industries Building or on loan to another museum. But when he returned from service as a naval officer, he faced an entirely new set of problems. Gen. Henry H. "Hap" Arnold, commander of the U.S. Army Air Forces, presented the Smithsonian with a collection of U.S. and enemy aircraft. When Paul Garber accepted responsibility for this vast collection, it was stored in an abandoned airplane factory in suburban Chicago, now the site of O'Hare Airport. The U.S. Navy had a similar collection of historic aircraft in storage for the Smithsonian at Norfolk, Virginia. The crisis came with the Korean War, when the U.S. Air Force needed the factory and began to force the Smithsonian out the door.

Determined to safely relocate the treasures to the Washington area, Garber searched in vain for empty warehouse space in the vicinity of the nation's capital. He then persuaded a pilot friend to assist him in conducting an aerial survey of the Maryland and Virginia suburbs from the cockpit of a Piper J-3 Cub. His search revealed 21 acres (85,000 m^{2}) of woodland in Suitland. The National Park and Planning Commission, which controlled the land, was more than pleased to turn it over to the Smithsonian in 1952.

"When I first went out there and walked around," Garber later commented, "my only companions were the bullfrogs and mockingbirds." There was no budget for this project. "I had to scrounge," he recalled with pride.

His powers of persuasion were legendary. Army engineers at nearby Fort Belvoir provided a bulldozer to clear trees and brush from the site. Garber persuaded a local contractor to donate any excess cement remaining aboard his trucks at the end of the workday. Navy officials agreed to provide, at cost, the first of the prefabricated buildings that would soon dot the site.

In 1966 The First Flight Society created the Paul E Garber First Flight Shrine.The shrine started as a portrait gallery of aviation luminaries who have been honored on Wright Brothers Day annually. A new portrait is unveiled during the December 17th celebration at the Wright Brothers National Memorial each year. The shrine is located within the WBNM Visitor Center in Kill Devil Hills, North Carolina.

== Quotation ==
"I'll beg or do whatever is necessary to get the old, famous airplanes for display at the museum."

== Later life ==
Paul E. Garber spent his later years giving programs and relating the stories about the beginning and progress of flying history. He came to be a leading figure of the Smithsonian Kite Festival (now renamed the Blossom Kite Festival), Smithsonian's annual kite-flying celebration held on the National Mall in downtown Washington, D.C. He was also instrumental in getting a DC law changed. Previously it had been illegal to fly a kite on the Mall. He was also a talented aircraft model maker. The Smithsonian's Paul E. Garber Preservation, Restoration, and Storage Facility was named for him before his death.

He died in his sleep on September 23, 1992, at the age of 93.

Garber's final resting place is in Arlington National Cemetery. He was preceded in death by his wife Irene and survived by two sons, James Paul and Edward Williams and a daughter Barbara Jane (passed in 1993).

== See also ==
- Paul E. Garber Preservation, Restoration, and Storage Facility - a restoration and storage facility for the Smithsonian Institution's National Air and Space Museum located in Suitland, Maryland, USA named after Paul Garber
- Crosswind kite power - Mr. Garber's target kite used crosswind kite power to give speed to the target kite to simulate the speed of enemy aircraft.
