= Peter Powell (kite maker) =

British kite maker (1932–2016)

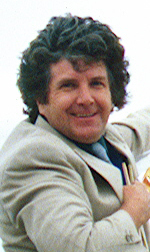
Peter Powell at the 1st AKA Convention in Ocean City, Maryland in 1978.

Peter Trevor Powell (29 June 1932 – 3 January 2016) was a British kite maker who developed a steerable kite in 1972, using dual lines. The kite that made him famous is known as the "Peter Powell Stunter". It became an international bestselling kite in 1976. Very early on, Powell's kites had spars made of ramin (Gonystylus) which were later replaced with aluminium tubing and, later still, by glass fibre spars. Originally they all came with black plastic sails, though later blue, red and yellow sails became available. The kites came with a long, hollow polyethylene tail that was inflated by the wind. The tail added stability as well as looking good when performing stunts.

== Early life ==
He was born in Gloucester, England. His parents toured with an Ideal Home Exhibition show and he served in the Royal Air Force where he trained as a mechanic and maintained Gloster Meteor aircraft. He then ran a business with his brother painting road markings.

== Kite production ==
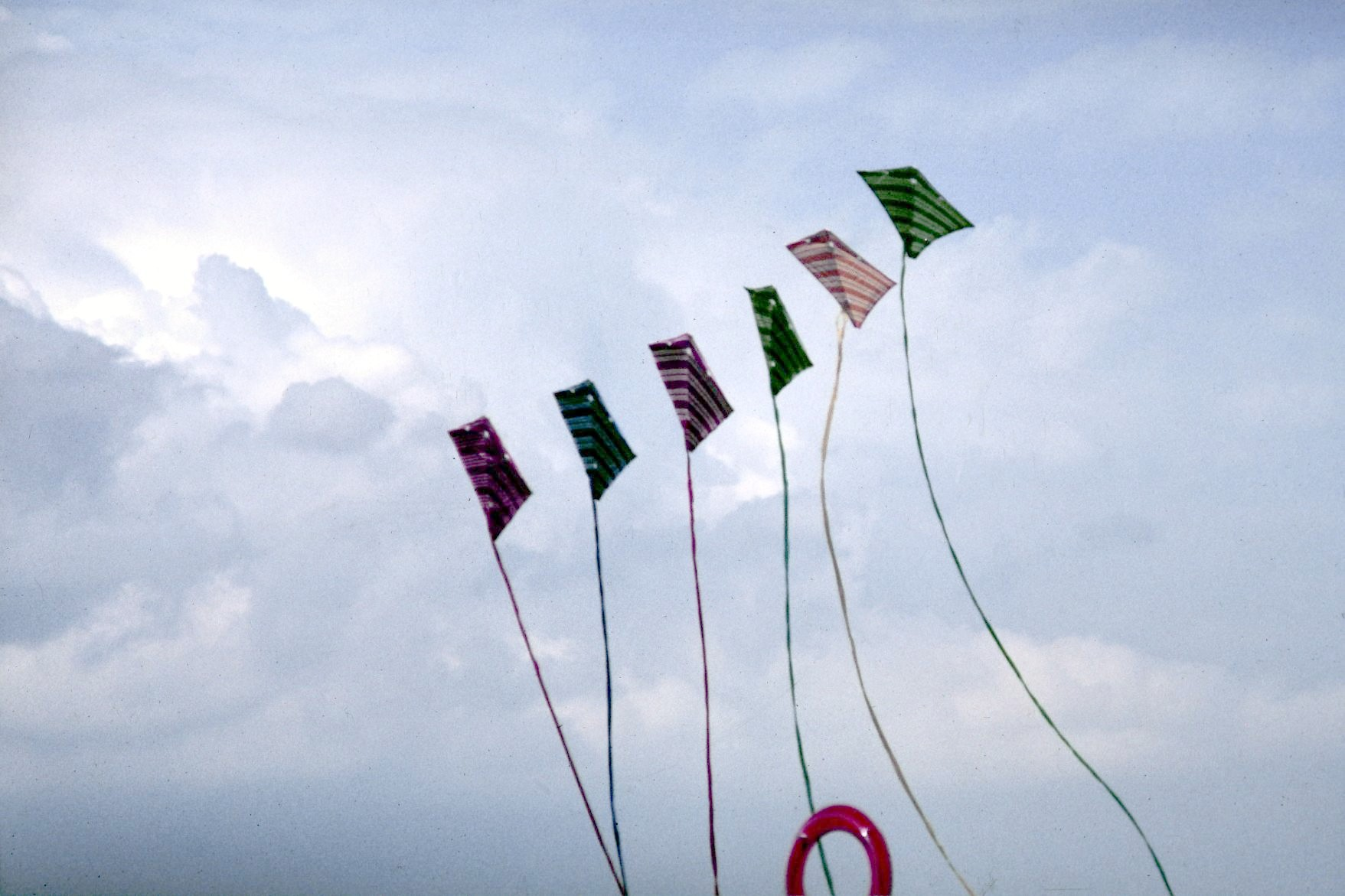
A train of Peter Powell Stunter kites

After Powell developed the "Peter Powell Stunter", he was producing and selling about 300 kites a week. This changed when the kite was featured on an episode of the BBC News and current affairs television programme Nationwide. Demand for the kites soared to 25,000 a week. Two factories were opened, followed by a further three with production reaching 75,000 a week.

Powell won the silver diploma for his kite at the Exhibition of New Inventions and Techniques in Geneva in 1975. In 1976, the Peter Powell kite was elected toy of the year by the British Association of Toy Retailers. Millions of kites were sold as flying steerable kites became a craze. The popularity of all types of multiple-line kite flying today can be attributed directly to Powell's development of a modern dual-line kite.

Powell often took his kites around the country and sold them from the back of his car. In 1974 (approx) he was selling them on Paignton sea front for £10 each. He advertised by simply flying the kites

Several decades later, as other companies created similar products, his sales declined and the company tottered on the brink. One day, according to an account from his sons, "Dad had been round all the factories, collected all their jigs for making the kite and he had a big bonfire and burnt everything to do with the kite. 'He said to me and Paul, whatever you do, do not start that business back up again.'"

However, in 2014, Powell and his sons Mark and Paul reopened a Kite store at the Cheltenham Shopping Centre focusing on a MKIII version of the kite.

== Personal ==
On 3 January 2016, he died at the age of 83 after a stroke at his home in Cheltenham, Gloucestershire. He has two sons, Mark and Paul who carry on his kite legacy.

== See also ==
- Kite flying
- Stunt kite
- Windsport
- Kite types
- Kite applications
