= Kite Festival =

Annual event in Bristol, England

Bristol International Kite Festival
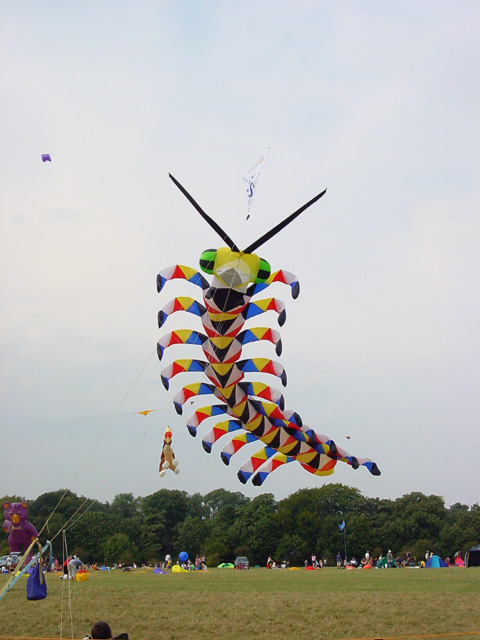
- A giant millipede kite at Bristol International Kite Festival
- Genre: kite
- Dates: September
- Locations: Ashton Court, Bristol
- Coordinates: 51.4437°N 2.64157°W
- Years active: 24
- Inaugurated: 1986
- Website: www.kite-festival.org.uk

The Bristol International Kite Festival, full name Bristol International Festival of Kites & Air Creations, used to be held annually during September in Bristol, England. It takes place at the Ashton Court estate, which is owned by Bristol City Council, although it is actually in the district of North Somerset. The festival started in 1986 and celebrated its 25th anniversary in 2011.

In 1991, the festival hosted the World Cup Sport Kite Championship. Organiser and kite designer Martin Lester was inducted into the World Kite Museum hall of fame in 1998. Funding problems have caused difficulties but have been overcome and the festival pulls in crowds of over 30,000.
