= Crack arrestor =

Structural engineering reinforcement

A crack arrestor (otherwise known as a rip-stop doubler) is a structural engineering device. Being typically shaped into ring or strip, and composed of a strong material, it serves to contain stress corrosion cracking or fatigue cracking, helping to prevent the catastrophic failure of a device.

The crack arrestor can be as simple as a thickened region of metal, or may be constructed of a laminated or woven material that can be designed to withstand deformation without failure. When correctly applied, the technique is capable of redirecting movement and safely distributing stresses. It is compatible with fail-safe design practices.

== Applications ==
Crack arrestors have seen extensive use in the aviation sector, particularly upon large pressurised aircraft as a means of guarding against progressive metal fatigue. Specifically, the skin of the fuselage typically has a large number of high stress locations, rivetting being a leading cause, making these points of potential crack initiation. Calculations are frequently used to simulate crack propagation, as well as the effectiveness of mitigating measures, such as crack arrestors, in ensuring the aircraft can be safely operated.

Following two catastrophic airframe failures in 1954, crack arrestors were used as additional reinforcement of the fuselage of the de Havilland Comet, although this was only one of several design changes made to address structural design weaknesses related to metal fatigue and skin stresses that had been previously unknown to the aviation industry.

Naval vessels are another place where crack arrestors have been extensively used. As of the 2010s, the United States Navy frequently applies them to areas of the ship that have been damaged or otherwise have received repairs in order to ensure that the affected element is not lacking in either strength or durability. It has been acknowledged that ships primarily composed of aluminium are significantly more prone to crack propagation than older steel counterparts; thus, the use of mitigating measures is likely to become more commonplace.

Crack arrestors have also been used in civil engineering. They have long been used in the nuclear industry as a structural element of reactors. Numerous pipelines used from transporting chemicals have been reinforced with such devices to protect against bursting and exterior damage alike. While commonly applied to metal alloys, appropriately designed crack arrestors have been used with composite materials as well. During 2008, Airbus Group was awarded a patent for a new design technique for a crack arrestor component.
