= Blossom Kite Festival =

Annual event in Washington, D.C.

Smithsonian Kite Festival / Blossom Kite Festival
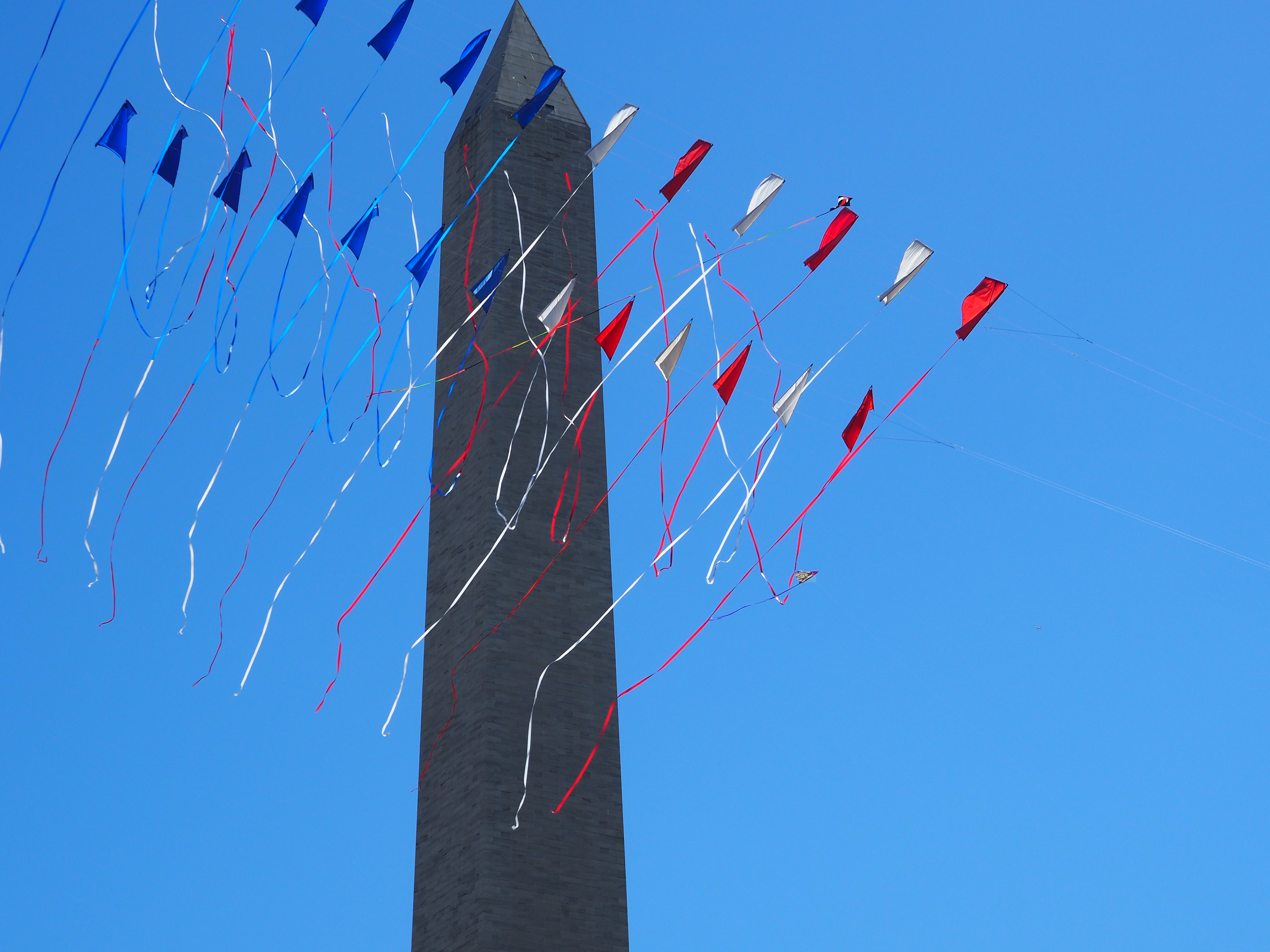
- Image of kites in display
- Genre: kites
- Location: Washington, D.C.
- Years active: 1967–2019, 2022–
- Website: http://www.nationalcherryblossomfestival.org

The Blossom Kite Festival, formerly the Smithsonian Kite Festival, is an annual kite event usually held on the National Mall in Washington, D.C. in late March during the National Cherry Blossom Festival.

== Organization ==
The festival was founded in 1967 by aviation pioneer Paul E. Garber, the first curator of the National Air and Space Museum (NASM). Until 2010, the Smithsonian Associates, the cultural, educational, and membership division of the Smithsonian Institution organized and sponsored the festival. The National Cherry Blossom Festival, Inc. began producing the festival in 2011 and renamed the event to the "Blossom Kite Festival".

== Past Festivals ==
Sponsored by the Smithsonian National Associate Program (see S. Dillon Ripley Center) and the NASM, the first annual Smithsonian Kite Carnival (later referred to as the Kite Festival) took place on the National Mall on March 25, 1967. Individuals could compete in contests with homemade kites as well as ready-made ones. The festival also included kite-making workshops led by Paul Garber, a lecture series, and a special display of kites made by Garber and his wife.

However, an 1892 law that was still in effect barred the flying of kites, balloons and parachutes within the city limits of Washington, D.C. In 1970, the Smithsonian Institution was therefore denied a permit to hold its annual kite flying carnival on the National Mall. On April 18, 1970, police arrested 11 people who were protesting the law by flying kites near the Washington Monument. As kite enthusiasts were not allowed to have the kite carnival that year in D.C., they moved the event to Fort Washington in Prince George's County, Maryland. The law was subsequently changed, permitting the kite carnival/festival to again be held on the National Mall.

The 2008 Smithsonian Kite Festival was held on Saturday, March 29 on the National Mall. The festival, which was tied to the 2008 Summer Olympics to be held in Beijing, China, from August 8 to August 24, 2008, highlighted the art and history of Chinese kites. The Smithsonian stated that the Chinese introduced the first kites more than 2,000 years ago. According to the Smithsonian, the Chinese first used kites in military affairs for estimating distances and carrying propaganda leaflets, but the kites' influence gradually spread to Western countries to become what the Smithsonian called a “familiar artistic and cultural icon.” The Smithsonian stated that kites continue to play an important role in China.

The 2009 Smithsonian Kite Festival was held on Saturday, March 28, on the Washington Monument grounds. The theme of the festival was "Going Green". Participants were encouraged to create environmentally and thematically “green” kites from renewable resources such as bamboo and recyclable goods such as paper and cloth. Organizers expected to distribute 1,000 free kites to children on a first come, first served basis.

The 2010 Smithsonian Kite Festival, which the Smithsonian Associates and the NASM presented, took place on Saturday, March 27. The theme was "CRAFTed for Flight". Events included the competitive Rokkaku Battle, Hot Tricks Showdown and Ground Display. The festival also featured a kitemaking competition that was open to any hand-made kite. Adult competitors and a team of judges ranging from kitemaking experts to local celebrities to museum staff chose the winners of awards in each category. Kitemakers were grouped according to experience and age: kitemaker, master kitemaker, age 11 and under, age 12–15. The event also encouraged non-competitors to make and fly kites on the Washington Monument grounds.

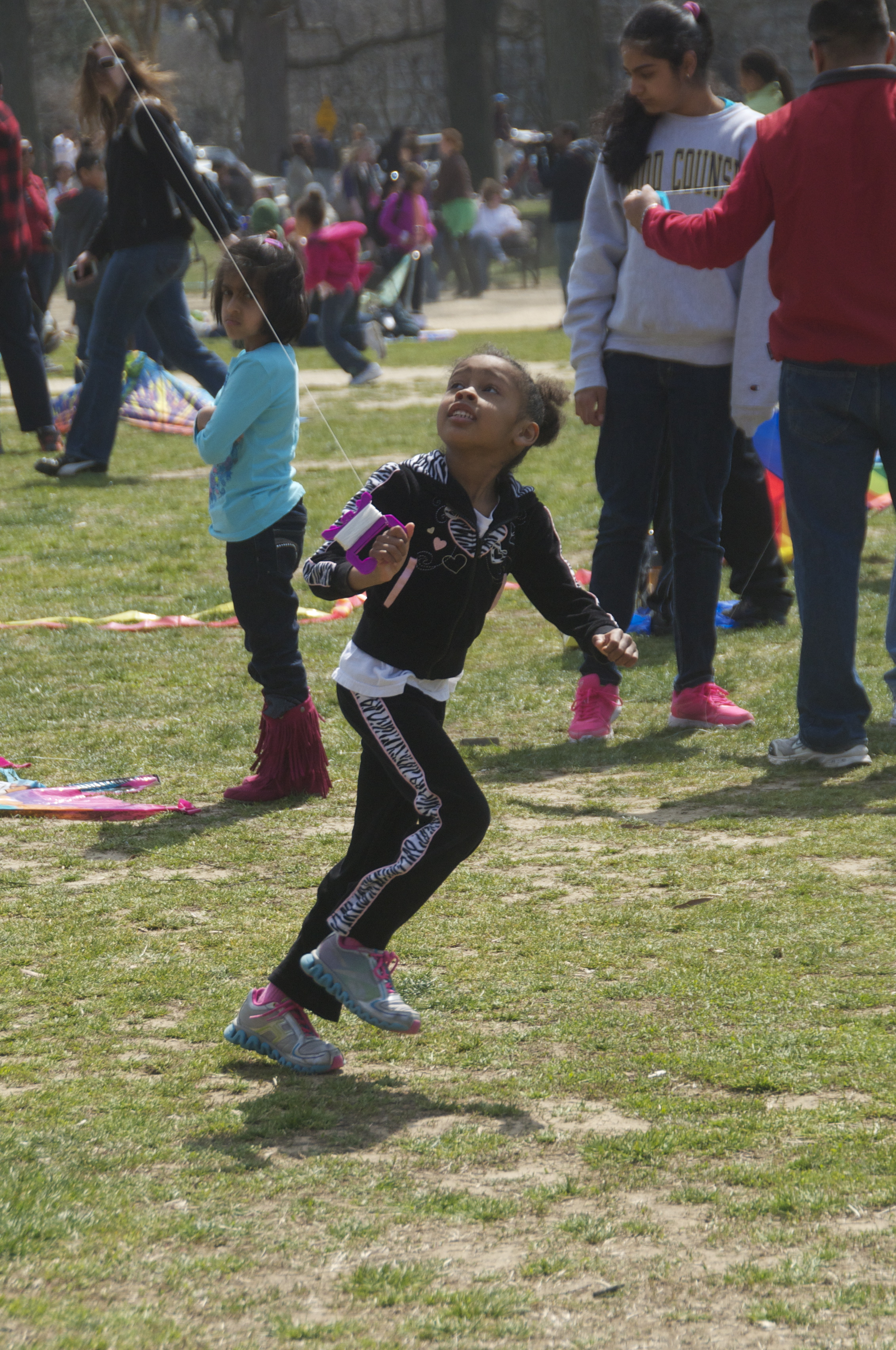
A girl flies a kite at the 2013 Blossom Kite Festival.

The first Blossom Kite Festival took place on the Washington Monument grounds on Sunday, April 10, 2011, following a postponent from March 27 because of forecasted inclement weather.

The 2012 Blossom Kite festival took place on the Washington Monument grounds on Saturday, March 31.

The 2013 Blossom Kite Festival took place on the Washington Monument grounds on Saturday, March 30.

The 2014 Blossom Kite Festival was originally scheduled to take place on the Washington Monument grounds on Saturday, March 29. However, the event's organizers first postponed the event to Sunday, March 30, because of rain and then cancelled the Sunday event because inclement weather had saturated the Monument grounds.

The 2015 Blossom Kite Festival took place on the Washington Monument grounds on Saturday, March 28.

The 2016 kite festival took place on the Washington Monument grounds on Saturday, April 2. The organizer's announcement for the festival stated: "Please note: drones are prohibited at this event."

The 2017 kite festival took place on the Washington Monument grounds on Saturday, April 1.

The 2018 kite festival took place on the Washington Monument grounds on Saturday, March 31.

The 2019 kite festival took place on the Washington Monument grounds on Saturday, 30 March.

After being held virtually or cancelled from 2020 to 2021 due to the COVID-19 pandemic, the Blossom Kite Festival returned to an in-person format on the Washington Monument grounds in 2022. The event continues to be held annually, with the 2026 festival taking place on March 28.

== Gallery ==
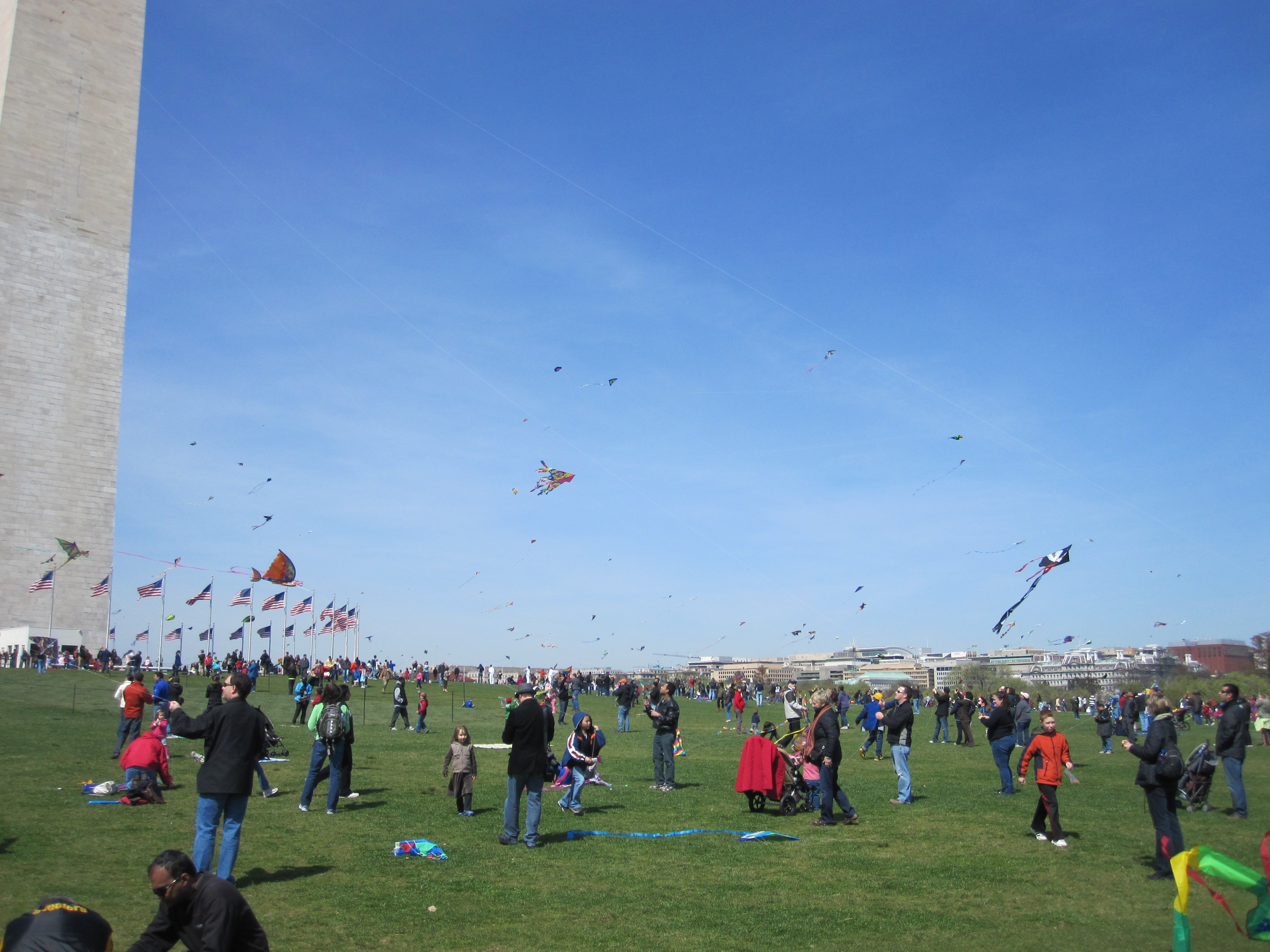
Smithsonian Kite Festival, March 27, 2010

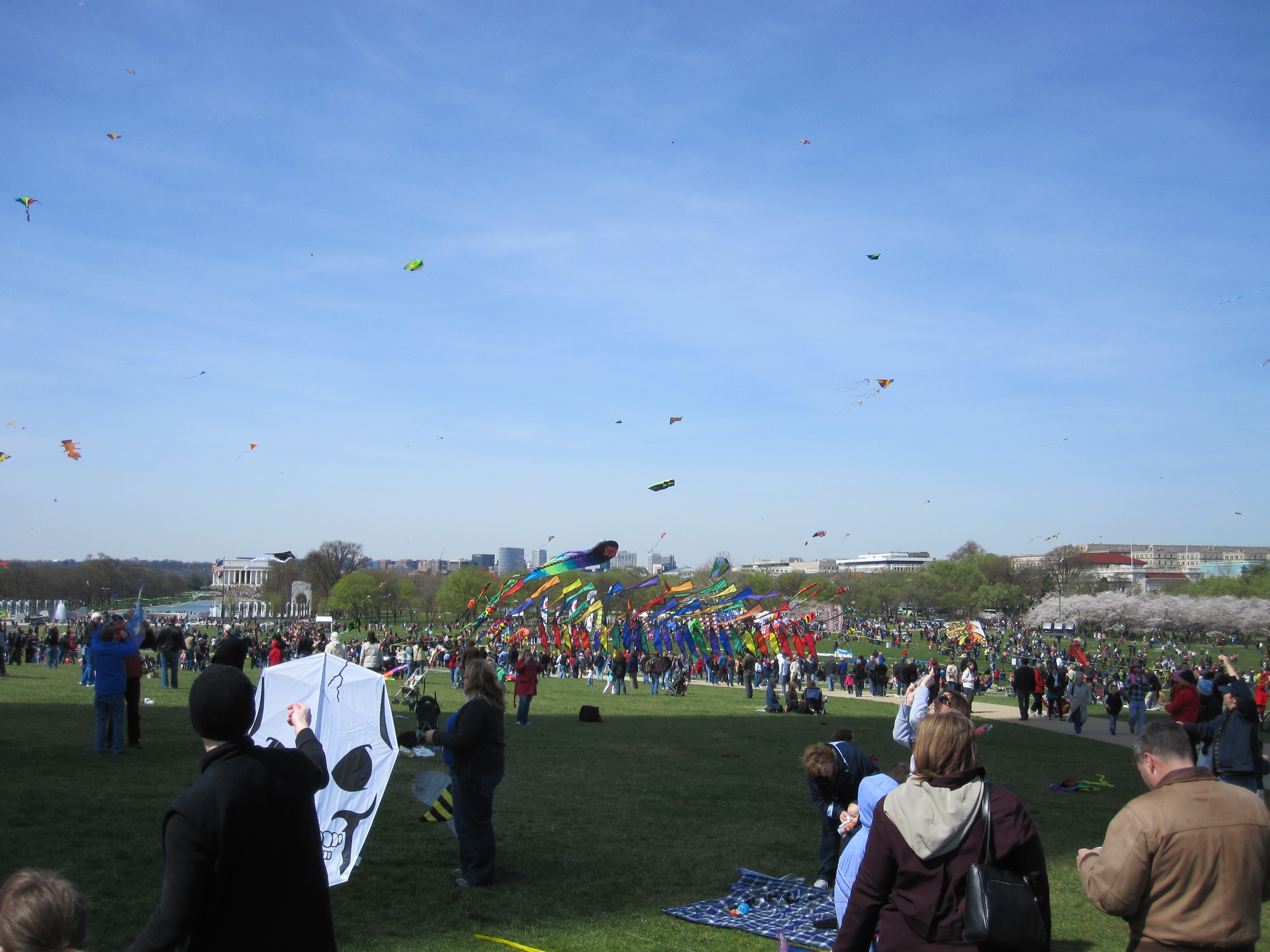
Smithsonian Kite Festival, March 27, 2010

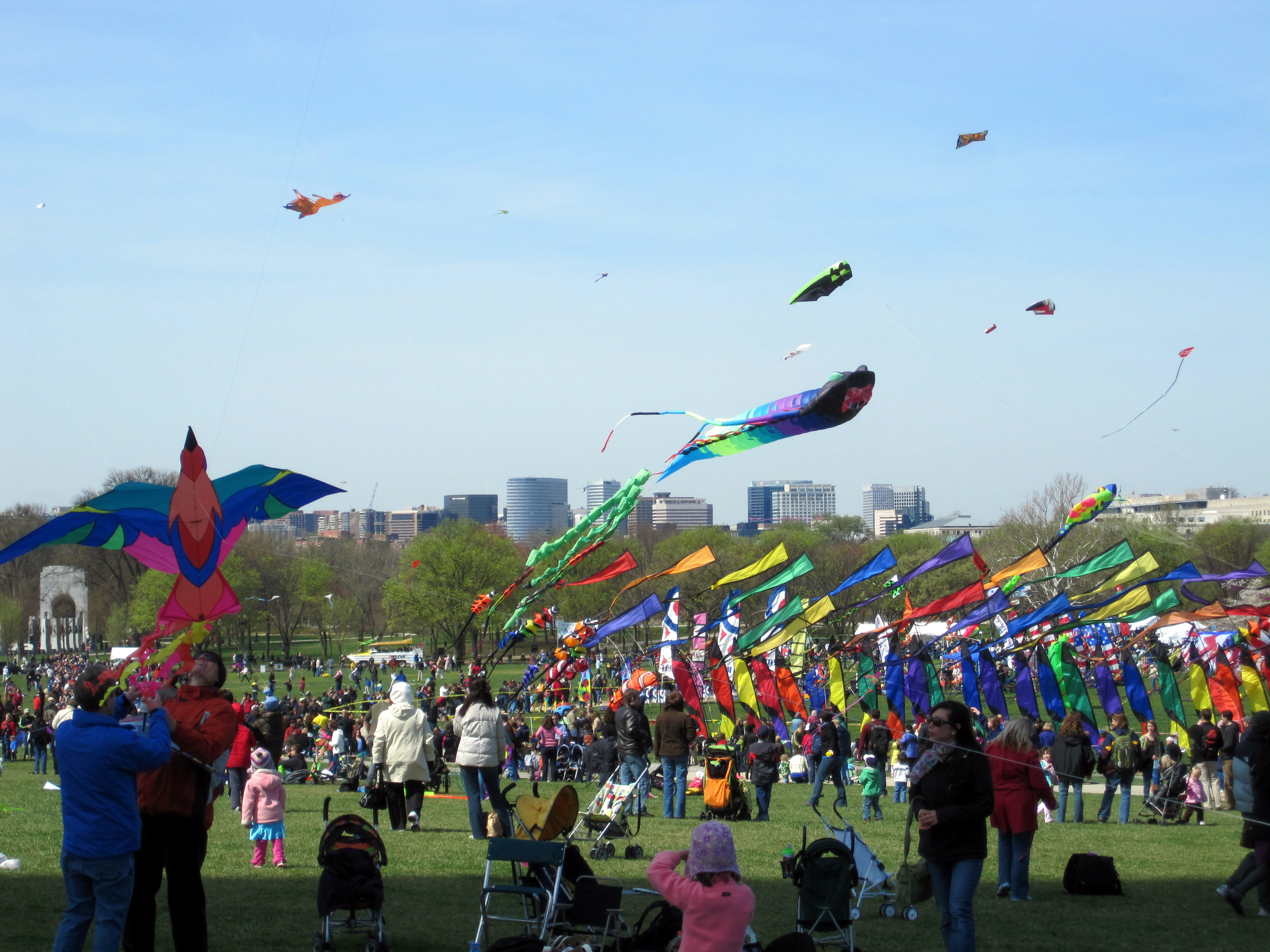
Smithsonian Kite Festival, March 27, 2010

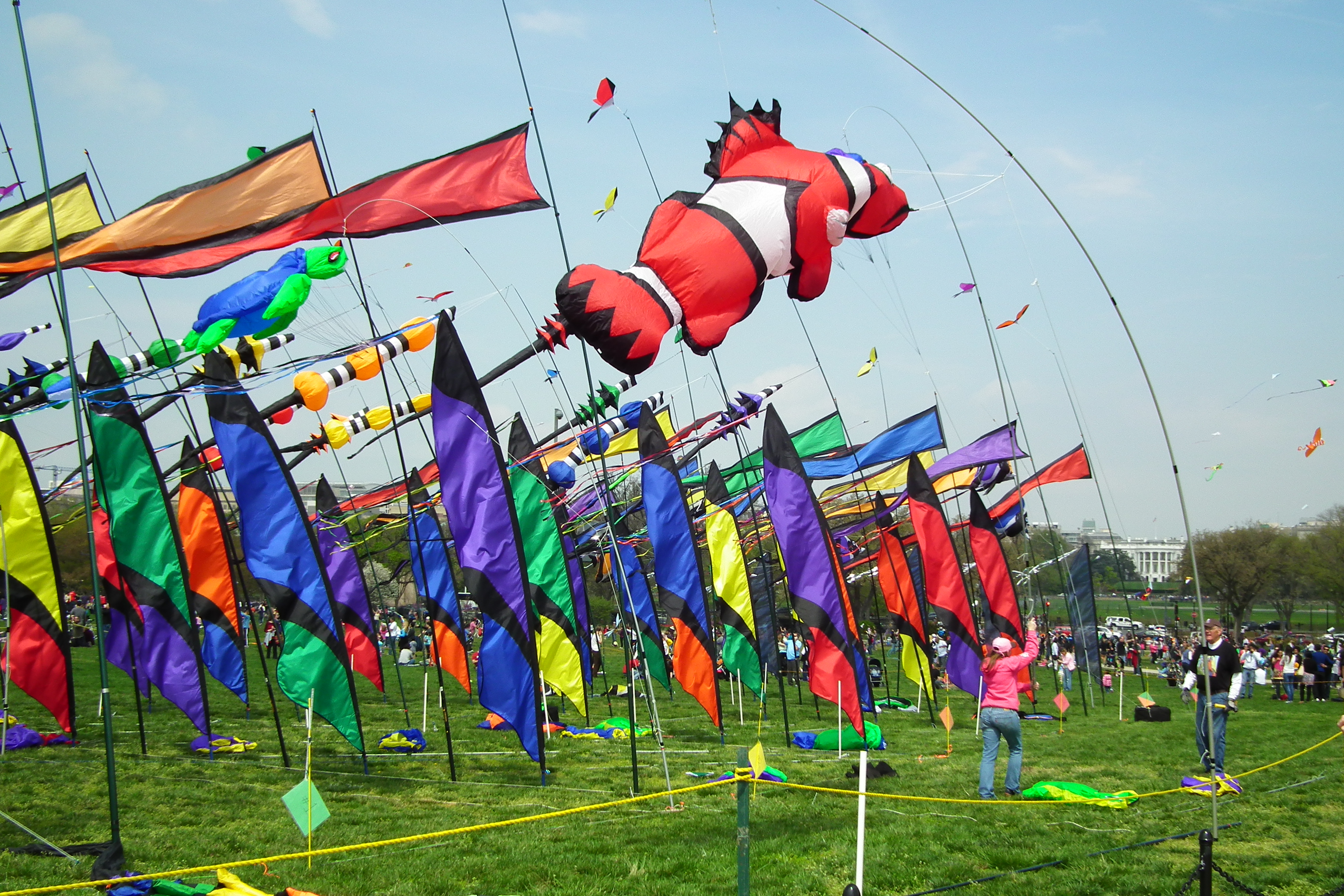
Blossom Kite Festival, March 31, 2012
