= Sport kite =

Type of kite

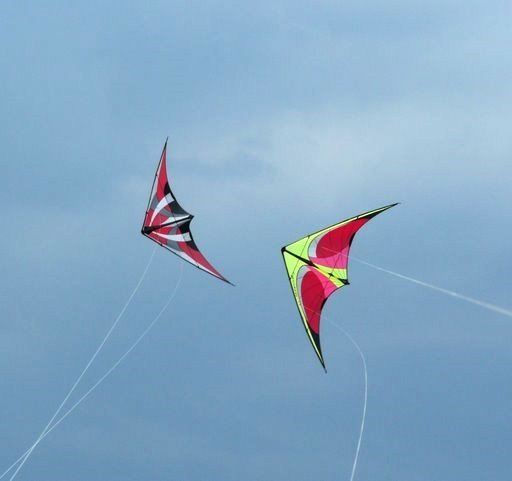
Two dual-line sport kites flying in formation.

Commercially made dual-line sport kite on display, ready for launch

A sport kite, also commonly known as a stunt kite, is a type of multiline kite that can be maneuvered in the air. A related kite, also controllable and used for recreation, but capable of generating a significant amount of pull and used for providing movement, is the power kite.

== Configuration ==
One common configuration for a sport kite is a roughly triangular "delta" shape based on the Rogallo wing, with two lines for control. Another common configuration is a W-shaped panel based on the Hadzicki wing, with four lines for control. These kites are normally constructed from lightweight ripstop nylon or ripstop polyester with spars made from carbon fiber tubing. The flying lines are made from braided ultra-high-molecular-weight polyethylene, which is light, does not stretch under tension and stays slippery even when wrapped many times.

Dual-line sport kites are controlled by the pilot adding and releasing tension on the right and left lines. A pilot may pull on the right-hand line to turn right, pull left-hand line to turn left, pull equally for straight flight, push the left-hand line to release air and turn right, and so on. The pitch can be controlled by walking/running forward or backwards, giving the lines different amounts of tension. Using a combination of pulls (to add tension or direct kite motion) and pushes (to give slack and let float into motion), complex tricks and patterns can be flown. These range in difficulty from turns, loops and landings, to maneuvers where the kite is flipped and turned end over end, wrapping the lines or floating on its front or back. During diving maneuvers sport kites may reach speeds of 100 km/h (60 mph), while in stall type maneuvers they can remain nearly motionless. This type of stall allows for various other acrobatic maneuvers to be performed.

Quad-line kites are controlled with a pair of handles, each with two lines attached to the top and bottom and attached to the kite correspondingly. To control the kite the pilot applies tension to the four lines, typically all four lines have some tension with some lines drawn back more than the others. The kite experiences more force on the lines held on higher tension. The pitch of the kite affects lift and forward drive, and since each of four lines can be moved the kite can be tilted, rotated, twisted, or pitched in any direction. Skilled use of these handles allows a quad-line kite to perform in ways that are difficult or impossible with a dual-line kite. Unique quad-line maneuvers include reverse flight, axis spins, hovers, and side to side flight.

Although some individuals consider fighter kites to be sport kites, they are generally considered a different category. Fighter kites rely on their instability to enter spins or fly straight using line tension on a single kite line. In contrast, sport kites use multiple control lines to precisely steer in any direction and control speed.

== Types ==
There are three main categories of sport kites:

=== Traditional dual-line sport kites ===
Controllable dual line kites have been around since at least the mid-1800s, and likely much earlier considering the history of kites into antiquity. Multi-line sport kites were popularized by designs of Francis Rogallo and Domina Jalbert, which were used in televised water skiing shows and movies in the 1960s. The Rogallo wing's simple design of triangular fabric was easy for amateurs to construct on their own. Larger kites were capable of pulling pilots or lifting passengers in water ski shows, smaller designs were flown by pilots on beaches or stands. Traditional sport kites were most prevalent from the 1970s through the 1990s. The sport kites were increasingly built for precise control, which featured heavily in competitions and demonstrations.

Kites are generally considered traditional or "old school" when they are flat and lack modern features. Traditional sport kites are generally flat when not billowed under wind pressure, although some later and transitionary models may include short standoffs. They often are heavier than modern kite designs with a straight-line triangular appearance. Flying was generally limited to linear flying and precise turns relying on straight-on wind pressure. The addition of standoffs, small rods to continually maintain the sail tension and the billowed shape, with kites becoming able to perform actions on slack lines generally and the ability to perform multi-dimensional acrobatic tricks marked the transition from traditional to modern designs.

=== Modern dual-line sport kites ===
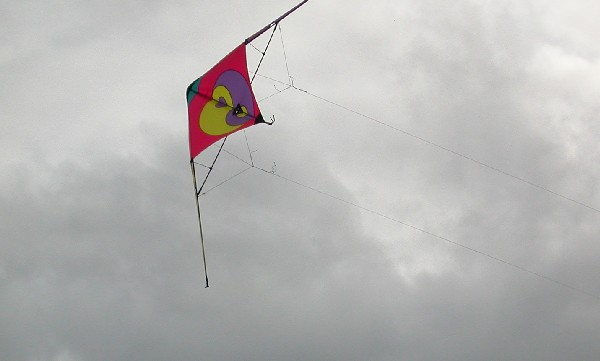
Dual-line sport kite shown from below. The control lines, standoffs, and 3D shape are more visible from this vantage point.

In the 1990s sport kites saw a design change which transformed sport kite flying. Rather than requiring wind to provide billowed sail shape to catch the wind, designers formed the kite into a 3D shape allowing it to catch the wind at any angle, even when slack, drifting backward, or lying on its back. As the kite was no longer relying on wind pressure to hold its shape there were pronounced gains in competitive precision flying (especially in light winds) and creation of an entirely new branch of slackline trick flying. The major defining factor in modern kites are standoffs, which provide a 3D shape to kites even when not billowed from wind pressure. Modern kites may have additional features like yo-yo stoppers for catching the line on tricks, ballast weights to improve stability or increase instability, tapered spars to allow twisted or curved shapes, multiple horizontal spreaders to introduce curved or recurved leading edges, and battens to further modify or reinforce the shape. The size, aspect ratio, billow, camber, balance and similar design factors all affect how the kite performs.

Kites favoring team or precision flying tend to move with more precision and stability, often with a feeling of weight, that taken together make it easier for a team to fly in uniform formation. This style of flying is about demonstrating control of the kite, through flying in preset patterns, in ballet choreographed to music, or through similar complex or precise maneuvers. Kites favoring trick or freestyle flying tend to prefer agility and dexterity, sometimes described as feeling 'floaty', for improved ability to perform 3D slackline maneuvers. This style of flying can push kites to their limits with the kite flipping and rotating in extreme, acrobatic ways.

=== Quad-line kites ===
Quad-line kite hovering at a right angle while touching a wingtip to the ground.

Quad line kites have been in use since at least 1899, documented in designs likely simultaneously invented by Wilbur Wright, John J. Montgomery, and possibly other aviation pioneers for flight control by warping the wing shape which featured as part of the Wright brothers patent war. Modern quad-line sport kites were re-popularized in 1988 with the creation of the "Neos Omega", later called the "Revolution 1". Both historic and modern quad-line kites allow the four lines to tension different areas of the sail body, resulting in both sail shape deformation and tension changes which in turn control the flight.

The modern quad line kites were popularized through 1989 being flown in the "innovative" competition category, and were quickly adopted by top fliers. Performances with the kites achieved top rankings at many competitions in 1989. Quad-line kites further gained popularity after sport kite team The Flying Squad quad-line team won back to back STACK European championships and later Team iQuad receiving industry awards for promoting the sport globally between 2006 and 2012. Revolution Kites initially dominated the quad-line market thanks to patent protections, but competing brands proliferated after the patents expired.

Quad-line kites are noticeable by the way that they can hover in space unlike any other sport kite. These kites can be extremely precise, hover in orientation, fly in any direction including sideways and reverse, even land at a specific spot on a wingtip.

== Technology ==
Sport kites can be designed to fly in a wide range of conditions. Many standard kites fly best in winds from 1.5 to 6 m/s (5.4 to 22 km/h; 3.4 to 13 mph). "Ultralight" and "super ultralight" designs are made from lightweight materials that can be flown in the slightest breeze or even indoors with calm air. High wind kite designs are often made with mesh panels or an "air brake" attached to the lines to fly in higher winds up to approximately 20 m/s (72 km/h; 45 mph). Wind ranges depend significantly on the skill of the pilot; novice or first time fliers may have difficulty keeping a kite airborne believing the wind is too light while experienced pilots nearby are performing acrobatic tricks in the same wind. For smooth and consistent flying a steady breeze is required, uninhibited by trees, buildings, hills, or other tall objects which may block the wind.

Professional quality kites are made from multiple synthetic materials. Kite sails are primarily made from lightweight ripstop polyester which has been chemically treated to minimize stretch, repel water, increase airtightness, and be UV resistant. Edge material is often heavyweight Dacron or Kevlar to provide reinforcement and strength. Kite frames typically use wrapped carbon fiber tubes which are lightweight and stiff, yet can flex to absorb strong wind forces and survive hard crashes. Kite lines are made from ultra-high-molecular-weight polyethylene like Spectra or Dyneema woven specifically for kite line to have minimal stretch under tension and slip over itself even when wrapped over itself many times from kites spinning midair. Some have wingtip and tail weight attachments which change the flight characteristics of the kite, making some advanced maneuvers easier or more dramatic. Reinforcements and connectors may be made from nylon, Mylar, aluminum, and similar materials.

A dual-line kite can range from $50 for a beginner kite, to over $300 for competition and performance quality kites. A quad-line kite can range from $150 for a beginner kite to over $400 for professional quality kites. Flying lines are commonly from $50 to over $100 per set.

Some kite designs may be classified as power kites and traction kites, which can be used to tow wheeled kite buggies (kite buggying) or surfboards (kite surfing). Power kites vary in size from "trainers" which often have dual-lines and a small sail area, to large full size traction kites with four lines, designed to pull people on kite boards or vehicles. Many of these strong-pulling designs include a safety strap which can be engaged in emergencies to release or depower the kite, with some designs adding an additional (third or fifth) line for this purpose.

== Accessories ==
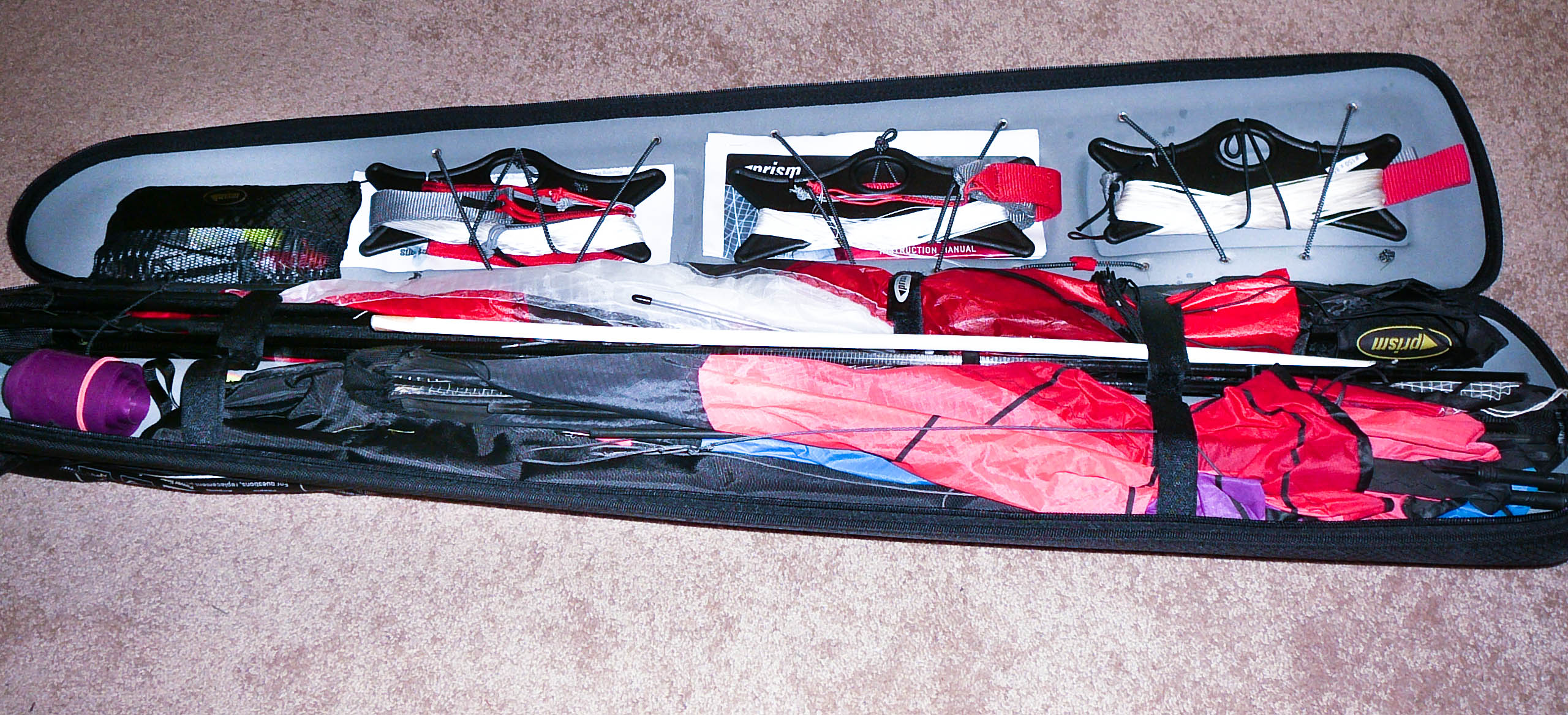
A molded kite case with line and accessories.

Many sport kite pilots have a variety of line sets, in different lengths and strengths (normally measured in lbs or pounds) to suit the wind conditions. Specialized kite bags are designed to tote a collection of kites, along with line sets and repair materials such as tedlar tape (for fixing punctured sails) and spare parts. Kite cases or bags also facilitate traveling with kites, some designed to fit into the overhead compartments on airplanes. Other accessories include hand-held (digital) anemometers for accurate wind speed information and LED lights that attach to the frame of the kite to allow for night flying. Some manufacturers offer replacement spars or spare components for their kites, for replacing damaged components after a particularly unforgiving crash landing.

== Competition ==
Fourteen quad-line kites hovering in formation.

Developments in multi-line kites allowed forms of kite flying to develop into a sport. Kite competitions have much in common with figure skating, with competitors being judged on their performance in compulsory figures as well as a ballet-style flying using artistic interpretation of music. Performances are done as individuals, a pair of pilots, or as a team. Team flying is typically the most spectacular, with typically four pilots flying within centimeters of each other and narrowly averting disaster, while performing all manner of figures and formations in the air.

Competitions are held nationally and internationally under the auspices of Sport Team and Competitive Kiting (STACK). There is a bi-annual World Championship or World Kite Cup, typically held at Berck sur Mer, France, last held in April 2024. The 2020 and 2022 events were cancelled due to the coronavirus pandemic. In the United States, the American Kitefliers Association (AKA) is the umbrella organization for sport kite contests; competition winners from the various regions are invited to the annual AKA convention for national championships. Other national organizations include the All-Japanese Sport Kite Association (AJSKA), FFVL France, FLD ev Germany, STACK Holland, STACK-Italia, and STACK-UK.

In 1996 the organizations AKA, STACK, and AJSKA formed the International Rule Book Committee (IRBC) to standardize rules and processes. The rulebooks include overall rules for events, descriptions of figures which may be selected for compulsory-figure flying, and guidelines for judging assorted events.

== See also ==
- List of kite festivals
- Peter Powell (kite maker)
