= Washington State International Kite Festival =

Annual US kite festival

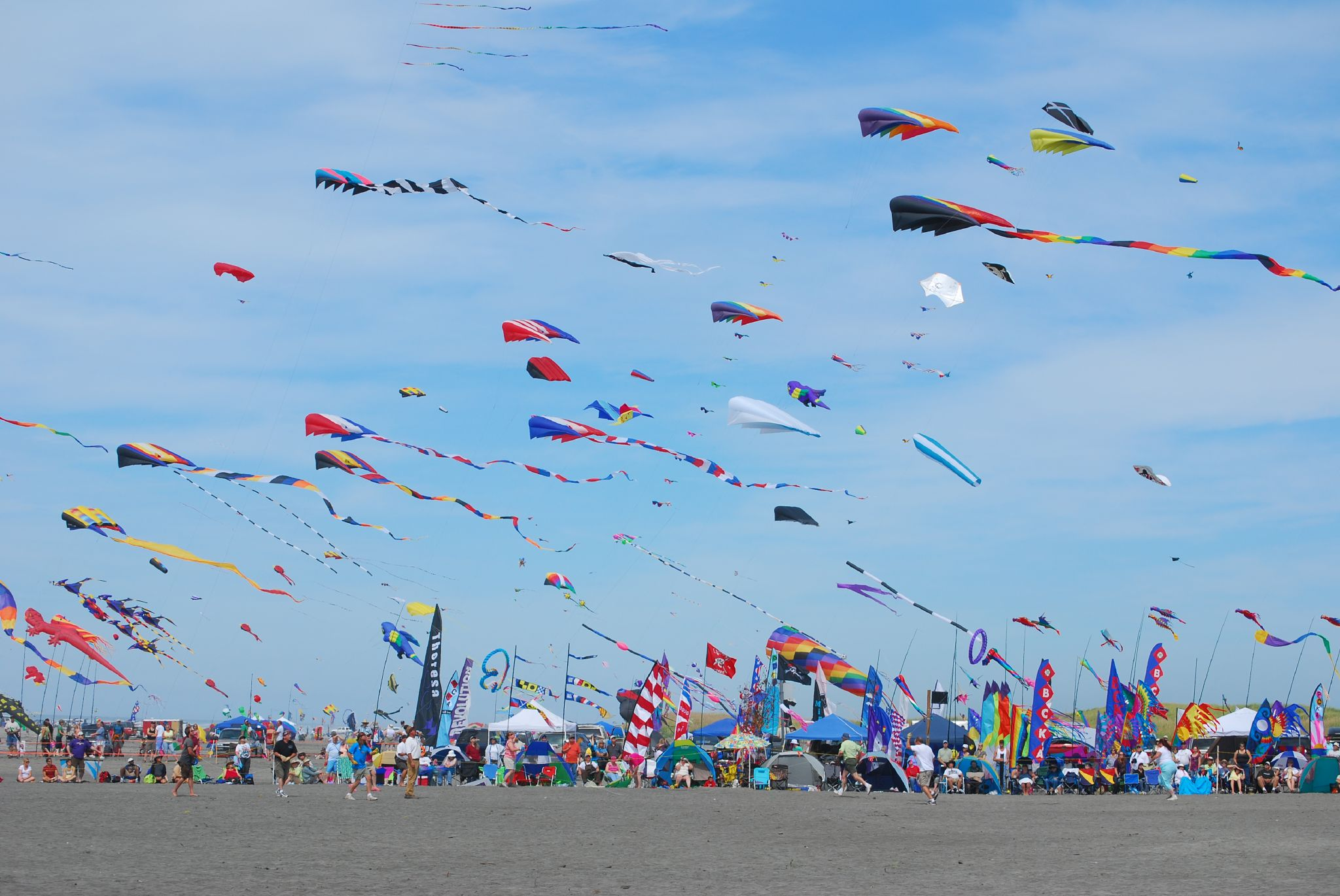
The festival in August 2008

Washington State International Kite Festival is the largest kite festival in North America. The annual event has been running since 1981 on the third weekend of August drawing more than 100,000 attendees, on the Washington state coast near Long Beach, Washington where there is a steady, strong wind, strong enough at times to drag pickup trucks kites are tethered to, or lift a man 100 feet into the air. Events at the festival include kite fighting and lighted kite shows. It is hosted by the World Kite Museum in Long Beach.

The festival was cancelled in 2020 due to the COVID-19 pandemic, resuming the following year.
