= American Kitefliers Association =

The American Kitefliers Association (AKA) was created in 1964 by Robert M. Ingraham of New Mexico. Its purpose is to educate the public in the art, history, technology, and practice of building and flying kites and advance the joys and values of kiting in all nations. AKA is the largest association of kiters with over 3,000 members in 25 countries.

The AKA serves as the umbrella organization to smaller clubs and kite groups around the United States, and as a sibling organization to other national organizations including the All-Japanese Sport Kite Association (AJSKA), FFVL France, FLD ev Germany, STACK Holland, STACK-Italia, and STACK-UK. The national organizations are members of a loosely-organized international collective, termed Sport Team and Competitive Kiting (STACK).

The association holds an annual convention for all club members at venues around the country, typically rotating between east coast, west coast, and central states locations. The 46th convention is planned for Niagara Falls, New York in September 2025. The 2021 and 2020 conventions were cancelled due to the COVID-19 pandemic. Past locations include Seaside, Oregon, Shreveport, Louisiana, Ocean City, Maryland, Enid, Oklahoma, Nags Head, North Carolina, and more. The convention typically includes an assortment of kite-related events like presentations, kitemaking classes, workshops, an "angel fly" memorial for those who have died, a lighted kite night fly, exhibits, a "fly market" of sales booth, a fundraising auction, business meetings for the organization, and an awards banquet. The convention also hosts the Grand Nationals competitions, the apex competitions for outdoor sport kite flying with events for individual, pairs, and team flying events on dual-line and quad-line kites, indoor kite flying, and for kite making in a variety of categories.

The American Kitefliers Association also regulates competitions and other kite events all over the country. Fliers of precision sport kites, which can make sharp turns and do tricks, are judged both on ballet style choreographed flight and also on how well they conform to prescribed precision flight patterns. International competition rulebooks have been standardized through efforts by the AKA, AJSKA, and STACK, and they serve as the guideline for local and regional competitions. Rulebooks cover general rules and event safety requirements, judge guidelines, standardized flying figures for precision events, and dispute procedures. For non-competitive events and kite festivals the association provides planning guides and templates, can help coordinate insurance, and can help publicize the event.

The AKA publishes Kiting, a full color quarterly magazine which is distributed to its members.
