= Weifang International Kite Festival =

Annual kite-flying festival in Weifang, China

The Weifang International Kite Festival (Chinese: 潍坊国际风筝节;traditional Chinese: 濰坊國際風箏節; pinyin;Wéifāng Guójì Fēngzhēng Jié) is an annual kite-flying festival held from April 20 to 25 in Weifang, China.

Weifang, Shandong, China is known as the kite capital of the world as people consider Weifang to be the birthplace of kites. Each spring, people in the city fly kites as a leisure outdoor activity. The designs on many Chinese kites have a symbolic meaning or illustrations from Chinese folklore or history.

On April 1, 1984, with the help and support of the Chairman of the Seattle Kite Association, David Checkley, the first International Kite Festival was held in Weifang. On April 1, 1988, the presidium of the Weifang International Kite Festival unanimously adopted a proposal to set Weifang as the "Kite Capital". In the following year, during the Sixth Kite Festival, the International Kite Federation was founded by representatives from China, the US, Japan, the UK, Italy, and twelve other countries, with the headquarters also being set in Weifang. During the Festival, performances are held in the evening with various Chinese singers performing at the gala.
