= Indoor kite =

Kite designed to fly without wind

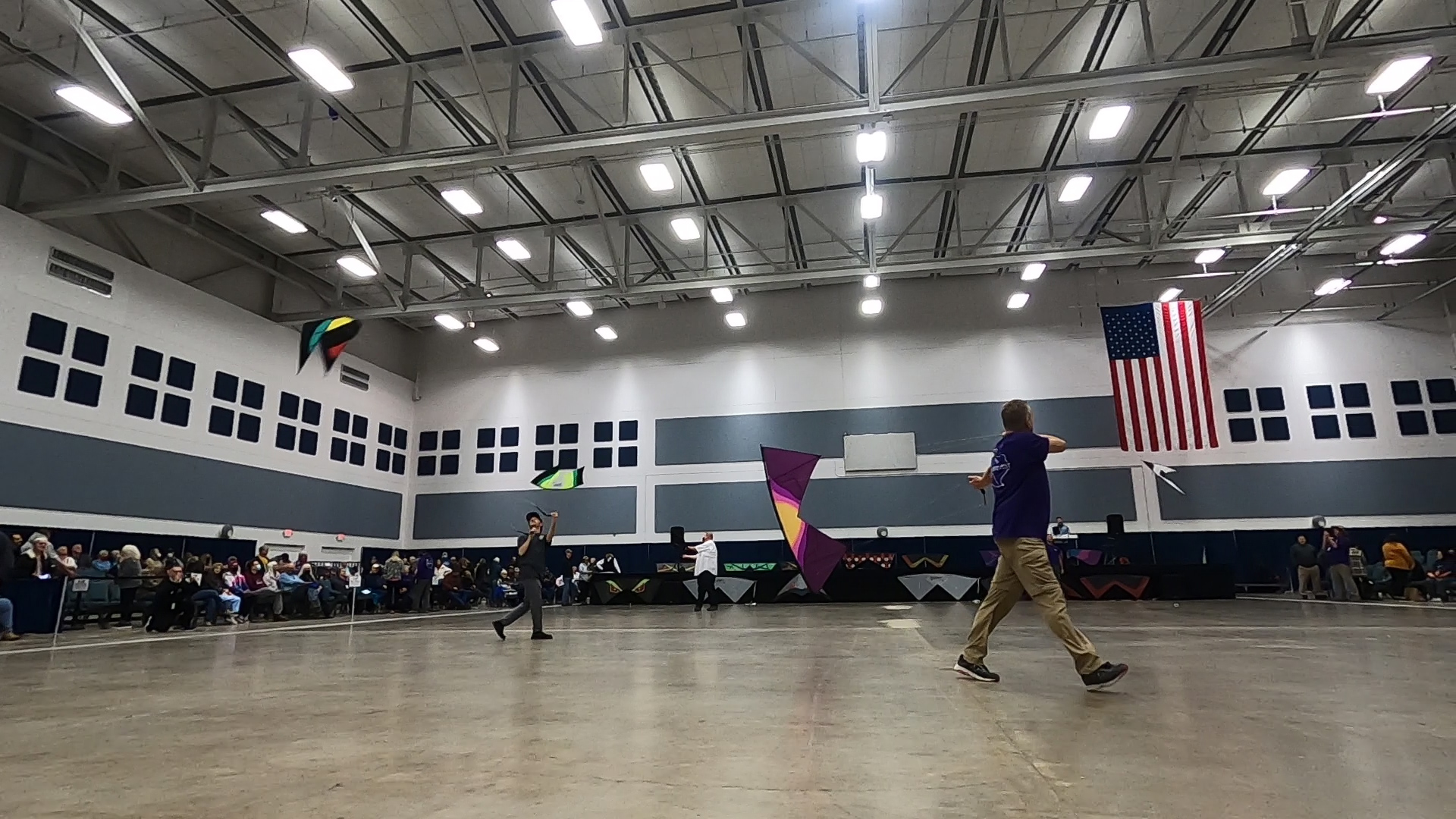
Four indoor kites being flown at once during the South Padre Island Kite Fest 2022.

Indoor kites are kites designed to fly in a windless environment. While principally designed for indoor use, they can also be flown outdoors when insufficient wind would render conventional kite-flying impossible. They are flown by using the relative wind provided by the motion of the kite-flier. This motion is typically generated by the user walking slowly, often walking backwards and in circular floor patterns, but it can also be achieved with suitable pulls along the kite lines with the pilot staying in place.

As ultralight kite making materials became available indoor kites were developed from the idea of flying low-wind kites. Indoor kites come in all varieties, typically variations of sport kites and glider kites. Two-line and four-line indoor sport kites are capable of performing most of the same tricks and maneuvers as outdoor kites, as well as maneuvers only available without wind like full circles around the pilot. Indoor kites are often flown in time to music and indoor kite festivals occur regularly, complete with the demonstrations and competitions that take place at outdoor kiting events.

== See also ==
- Kite types
- Kite applications
- Kite mooring
- Rogallo wing
