= Bali Kite Festival =

Annual kite festival in Indonesia

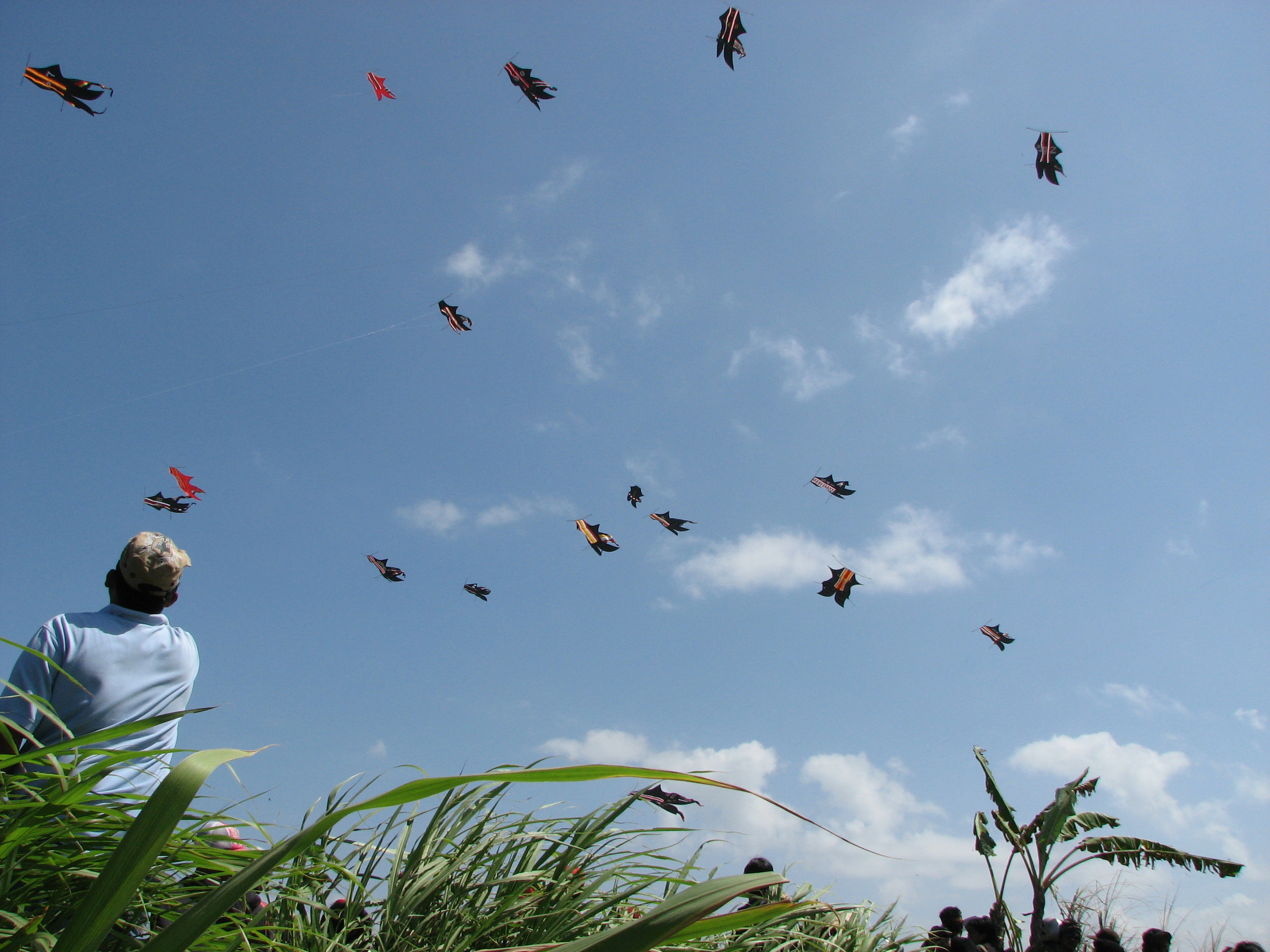
Bebean (fish-shaped) kites flown at the Bali Kite Festival

The Bali Kite Festival is an annual international kite festival held in July in Padang Galak area, Sanur Beach, Bali. Traditional giant kites (4 metres in width and almost 10 metres in length) are made and flown competitively by teams from the villages (banjar) of Denpasar. The event is a seasonal religious festival intended to send a thanking message to the Hindu gods to create abundant crops and harvests.

The teams consist of about 70 to 80 people, each team with its own Gamelan band, flag bearers and flyers.

Bebean (fish-shaped), Janggan (bird-shaped). and Pecukan (leaf-shaped) are three traditional kites flown during this kite festival. The kites are flown by teams of 10 or more adult kitefliers. The Bebean is the largest kite, and looks like a broad-mouthed, split-tailed fish. The Janggan form has a broad flowing cloth tail that can reach more than 100 metres in length.

The Pecukan requires the most skill to fly, as its unstable form often tumbles towards the ground. Red, white, and black are traditional colours used in the kite's designs. Each type of traditional kite has its own competition, with heats of 10 teams vying for the best launch and longest flight. Sometimes, the kites come down over the adjacent rice paddies, and the team members have to dash through the paddy to rescue the kite before it lands in the water.

A competition is also held for 'New Creation' (kreasi baru) kites which may include detailed three-dimensional figures representing the Hindu Gods or sponsorship kites. Traditional and new creation kites are constructed from bamboo and cotton cloth.

In the dry season of June through August, the winds blow continually from east to west in most of Indonesia. Balinese children and adults fly kites in the vacant rice paddies during this period.

A gamelan orchestra plays music throughout the festival. The festival attracts many tourists and international kitefliers, along with many local spectators.

== See also ==
- Culture of Indonesia
- Balinese saka calendar
