= Junkers J 3 =

Early German all-metal fighter project

J 3
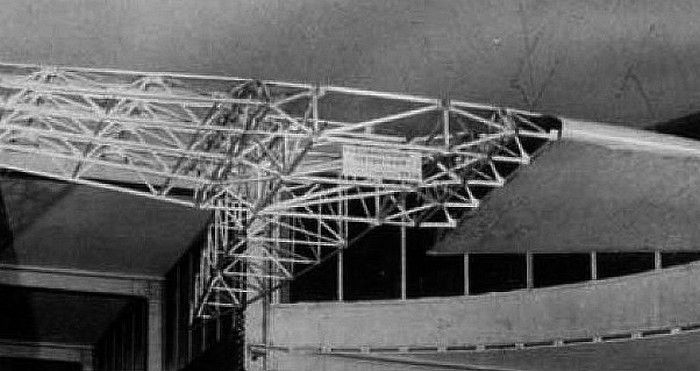
- Incomplete airframe of the J 3 at the Junkers Lehrschau, Dessau

General information
- Type: Fighter
- National origin: German Empire
- Manufacturer: Junkers
- Designer: Otto Mader
- Status: Abandoned
- Primary user: Luftstreitkrafte
- Number built: None completed

History
- Manufactured: 1916

The Junkers J 3 was an all-metal single-seat experimental fighter aircraft.

== Design and development ==
A serious problem with the J 1 and J 2 designs was their weight, being built of heavy iron sheets and pipes. The IInspektion der Fliegertruppen (IIdflieg) saw all-metal construction as only useful for ground attack and observation aircraft, being too heavy for use in fighters. In April 1916, to prove IIdflieg wrong, Hugo Junkers commissioned his head of engineering Otto Mader in Dessau to develop a small, single-seat experimental aircraft of all-metal construction that could meet the climbing performance and manoeuvrability of a fighter. Junkers suggested the use of duralumin, produced since 1909 at Dürener Metallwerke AG, which had been available in sufficient quantities for some time and promised a weight reduction of 60 per cent compared to a conventional iron construction.

Mader envisaged two variants of the J 3; the J 3-I single-seat fighter and the J 3-II two-seat attack aircraft. A special feature of the construction was the use of corrugated sheets to compensate for the lower strength of the duralumin sheets. The underlying tube construction was made of duralumin, with steel at important construction points. The aircraft was powered by a Oberursel U.III rotary engine, which was lighter than the Mercedes D.III that powered the J 2. Also new in the design of the J 3 was the three-section wing, consisting of a center section integrated into the fuselage and a pair of outer sections. The outer sections were attached to the center section using ball screws, which were a feature of later aircraft, allowing interchangeability of the outer wings. The J 3 was built using rivets, as welding was found to be too difficult light metals.

The development and construction of the prototype took place without an order from IdFlieg and was operated entirely at Junkers' own expense. Before J 3 prototype construction, an aerofoil made of duralumin was produced and subjected to extensive load tests. By using duralumin instead of iron, the weight of the wing could be reduced by a third. Since the welding process used in the J 1 and J 2 was to be replaced by riveted joints in the J 3, extensive experiments were carried out in the workshop on riveting processes before prototype construction.

Construction of the prototype J 3-I began in the summer of 1916. By autumn the tubular frame and the corrugated iron cladding of the wings had already been completed. Lack of funds and the looming IIdFlieg order for the Junkers J 4 forced Hugo Junkers to stop work on the half-finished J 3 in October 1916. Mader and his engineers devoted themselves to the construction of the Junkers J 4 from November 1916. Duralumin was also used in the construction of the J 4, which later became the first all-metal aircraft of lightweight construction, instead of the J 3.

== Legacy ==
Although the Junkers J 3 was not completed, it laid the foundations for light aircraft construction. The use of riveting in aircraft and fixture construction and the basic design criteria for light metal aircraft resulted from the development of the J 3. Numerous design elements of the J 3, such as ball screw connections and corrugated sheet metal, remained features of Junkers aircraft from the 1920s up to the Junkers Ju 52.

== Variants ==
J 3-I
Single-seat fighter. Prototype abandoned midway through construction.

J 3-II
Two-seat ground attack aircraft. None built.

== Fate ==
The half-finished Junkers J 3 was stored in Dessau with the J 1 and several J 2s. In the mid-1920s, these aircraft were brought to an exhibition at the new Junkers Lehrschau to document the early phase of all-metal aircraft construction. Some sources report that the J 3 was destroyed in a bombing raid, while others report that the Americans removed the exhibition before Dessau was evacuated. All traces of the J 3 prototype were lost towards the end of the Second World War.

== Specifications (J 3-I, as designed) ==
Data from "Die Junkers-Lehrschau" (1929) and "Junkers J 3" (2016)

General characteristics

- Crew: 1
- Length: 7.7 m (25 ft 3 in)
- Wingspan: 13 m (42 ft 8 in)
- Height: 3.1 m (10 ft 2 in)
- Wing area: 21 m^{2} (230 sq ft)
- Empty weight: 518 kg (1,142 lb)
- Max takeoff weight: 770 kg (1,698 lb)
- Powerplant: 1 × Oberursel U.III air-cooled rotary engine, 114 kW (153 hp)

Performance

- Maximum speed: 190 km/h (120 mph, 100 kn)
- Range: 170 km (110 mi, 92 nmi)
- Service ceiling: 6,480 m (21,260 ft)
- Rate of climb: 8.3 m/s (1,630 ft/min)

== See also ==
Related development

- Junkers J 1
- Junkers J 2
- Junkers D.I
- Junkers CL.I

== Bibliography ==
- Owers, Colin A. (2018). Junkers Aircraft of WWI: Volume 1: Junkers J.1–J.4: A Centennial Perspective on Great War Airplanes. Great War Aviation Centennial Series. Vol. 30. n.p.: Aeronaut Books. ISBN 978-1-935881-65-0.
