= Aviation museum =

Museum exhibiting history and artifacts of aviation

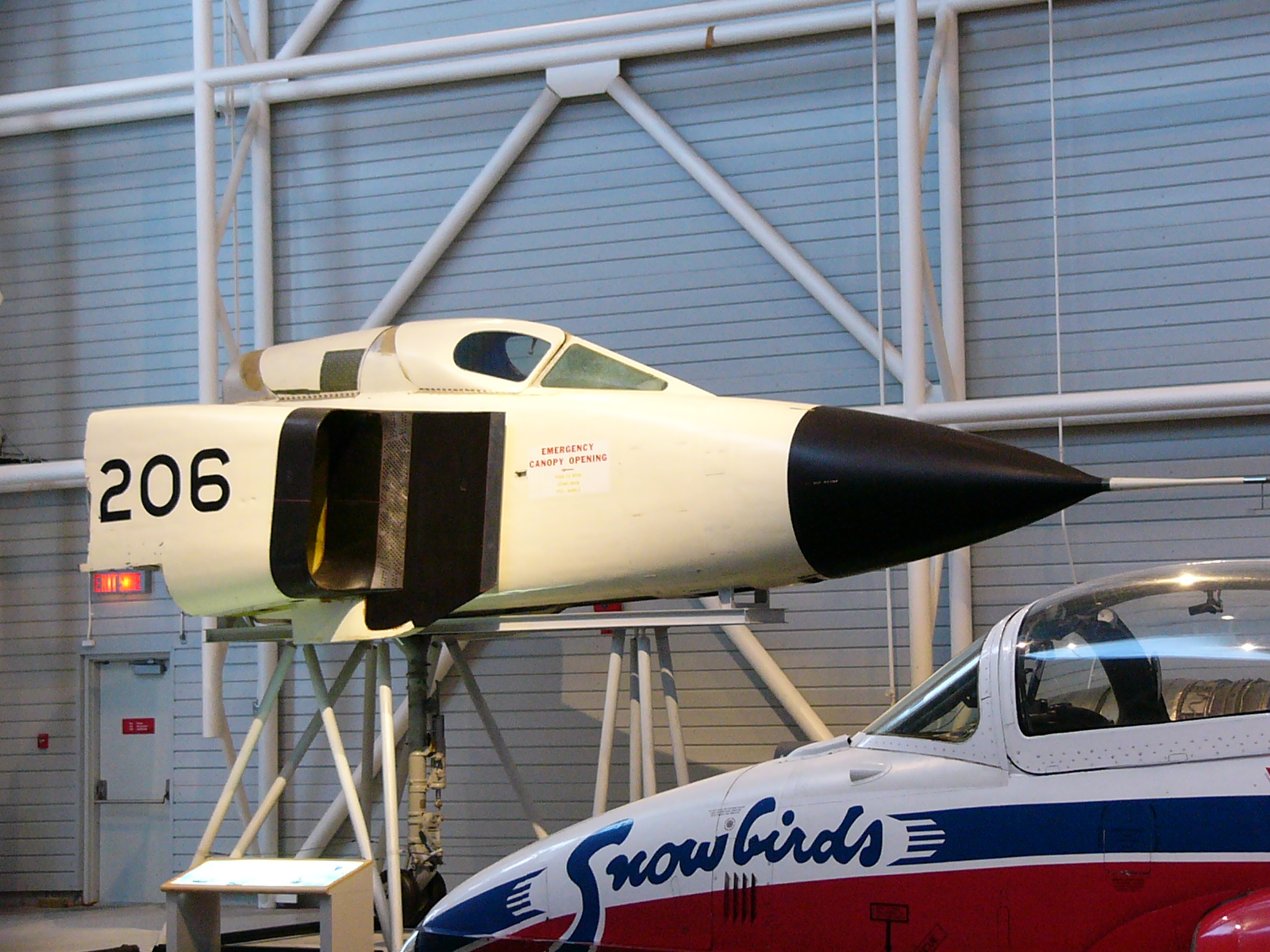
Museum artifact: the nose section of Avro Arrow RL 206 in the Canada Aviation Museum.

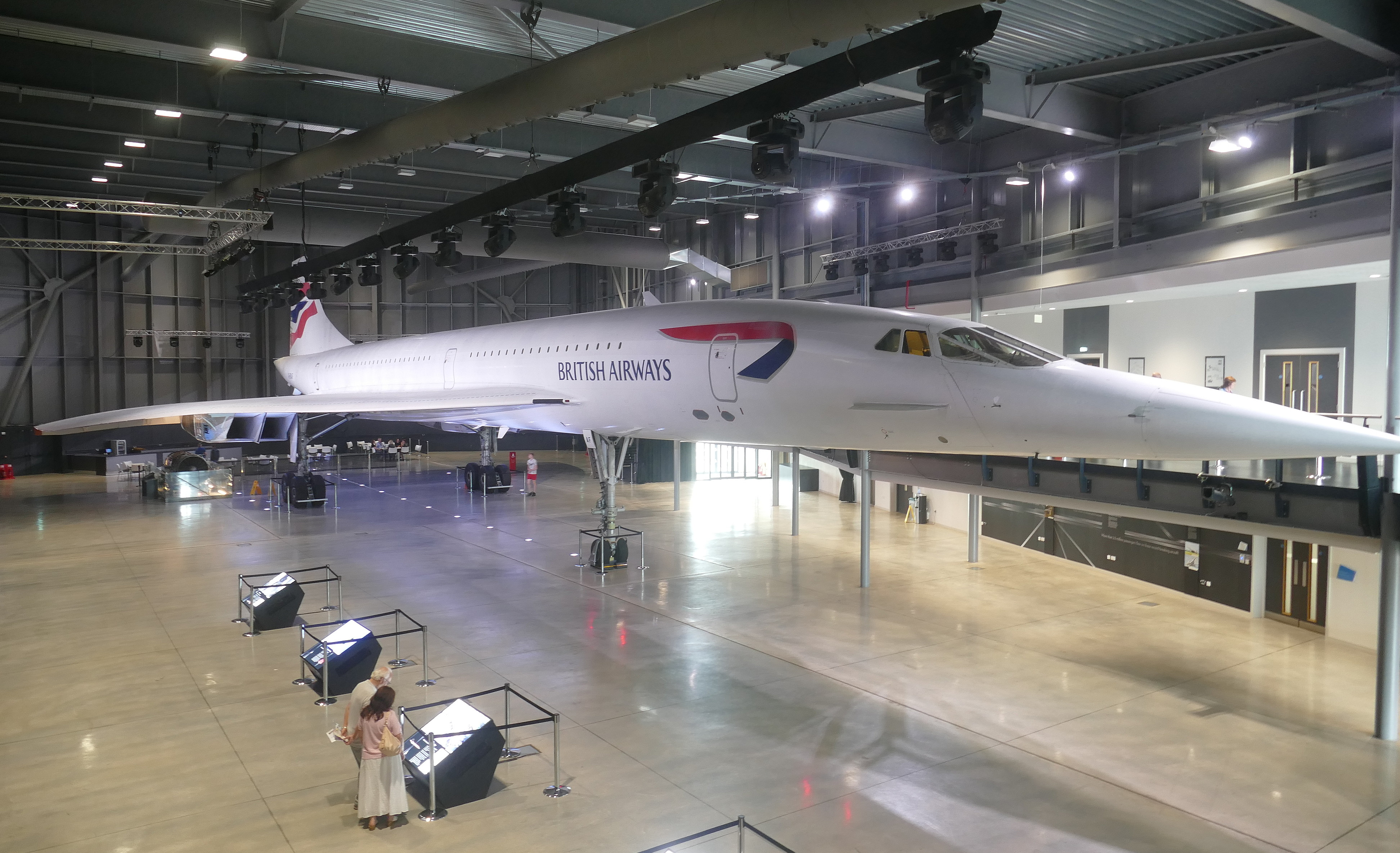
Ex-British Airways Concorde G-BOAF at the Aerospace Bristol museum, England.

An aviation museum, air museum, or air and space museum is a museum exhibiting the history and artifacts of aviation. In addition to actual, replica or accurate reproduction aircraft, exhibits can include photographs, maps, models, dioramas, clothing and equipment used by aviators.

== Size and focus ==
Aviation museums vary in size from housing just one or two aircraft to hundreds. They may be owned by national, regional or local governments or be privately owned. Some museums address the history and artifacts of space exploration as well, illustrating the close association between aeronautics and astronautics.

Many aviation museums concentrate on military or civil aviation, or on aviation history of a particular era, such as pioneer aviation or the succeeding "golden age" between the World Wars, aircraft of World War II or a specific type of aviation, such as gliding.

== Use of aircraft ==
Aviation museums may display their aircraft only on the ground or fly some of them. Museums that do not fly their aircraft may have decided not to do so either because the aircraft are not in condition to fly or because they are considered too rare or valuable. Museums may fly their aircraft in air shows or other aviation related events, accepting the risk that flying them entails.

== Archival materials ==
Some museums have sets of periodicals, technical manuals, photographs and personal archives. These are often made available to aviation researchers for use in writing articles or books or to aircraft restoration specialists working on restoring an aircraft.

== See also ==
- Warbird
