= Finsterwalder (disambiguation) =

Finsterwalder is a German language word meaning 'dark forests'. Finsterwalder is a German aircraft manufacturer.

Finsterwalder may also refer to:

== Aircraft ==
- Finsterwalder Funfex, a German high-wing, single-place, hang glider, designed and produced by Finsterwalder
- Finsterwalder Perfex, a German high-wing, single-place, hang glider, designed and produced by Finsterwalder
- Finsterwalder Speedfex, a German high-wing, single-place, hang glider, designed and produced by Finsterwalder

== Places ==
- Finsterwalder Glacier, a glacier in Antarctica

== People with the surname ==
- Frauke Finsterwalder (born 1975), German film director and screenwriter
- Sebastian Finsterwalder (1862–1951), pioneered the use of repeat photography as a temporal surveying instrument in photogrammetry of alpine glaciers
- Richard Finsterwalder (born 1963), German geodesist, cartographer and university professor

== See also ==
- Finsterwald
