= Flexible wing =

Flexible airfoil

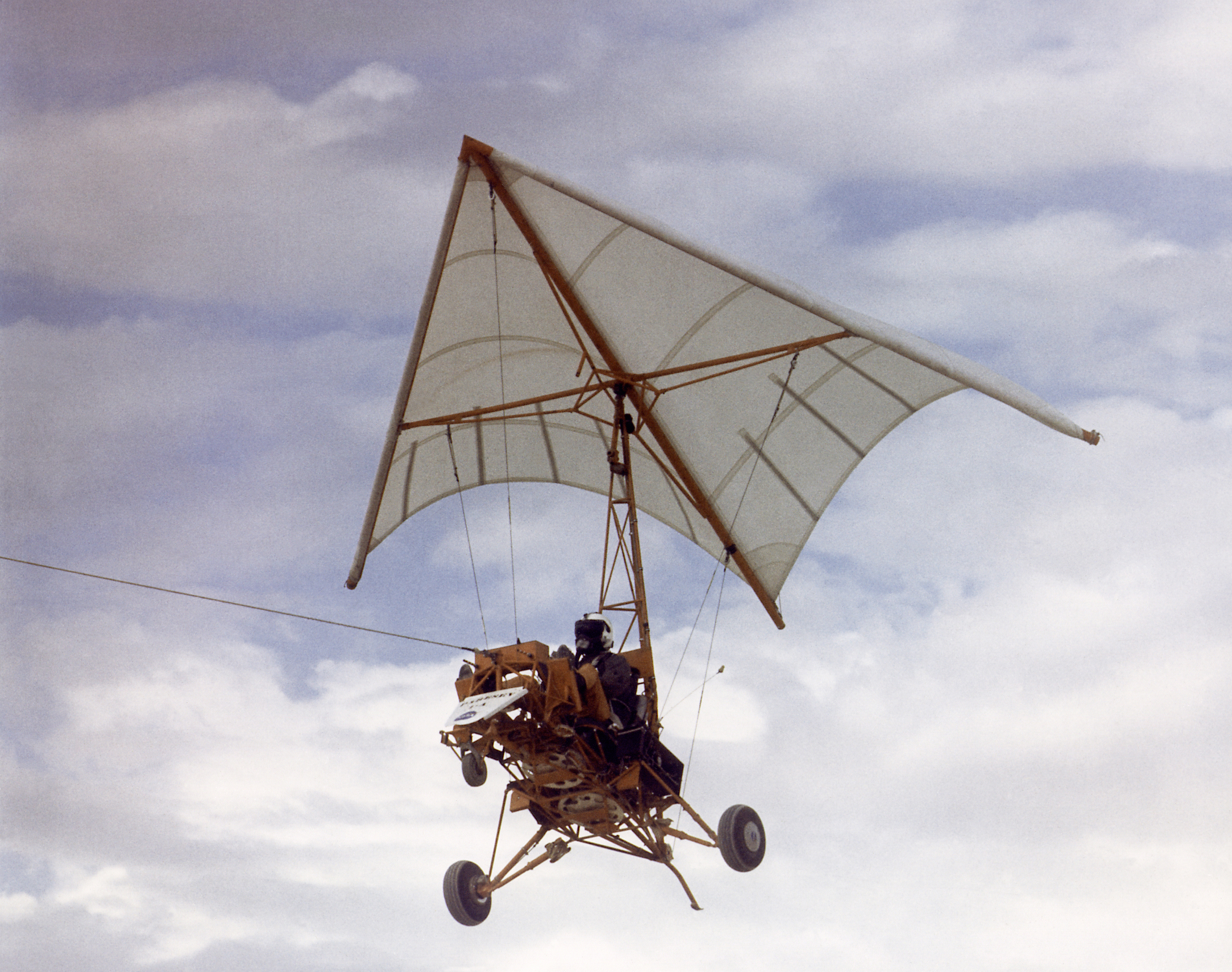
The NASA Paresev was one of the first powered Rogallo-winged aircraft to fly

In aeronautics, a flexible wing is an airfoil or aircraft wing which can deform in flight.

Early pioneer aeroplanes such as the 1903 Wright Flyer used the flexible characteristics of lightweight construction to control flight through wing warping. Others made collapsible wings for folding away, such as the flying car designs by Gustave Whitehead.

Since the 1960s flexible wings have dominated hang glider and ultralight aircraft designs, with such types as the delta-shaped Rogallo wing and the fully collapsible paraglider.

More recently, the advent of high-strength flexible materials and other advanced technologies has renewed interest in the use of flexing for control purposes.

== Pioneer aircraft ==
=== Control ===
The first effective control system on a powered aircraft allowed one to fly for the first time. The Wright Flyer used wing warping for lateral or roll control, by twisting one wing tip to increase its angle to the air while twisting the other to reduce its angle. The Wright brothers patented system was widely copied.

However, as engine powers and air speeds rose, so too did the forces needed to operate the pilot controls and by 1914 warping was all but abandoned.

=== Collapsibility ===
Predating successful controlled and powered flight, collapsible wings had been developed in an attempt to solve the problems of ground storage and transport. A system of radial ribs like a giant folding fan, sometimes described as bat-like, was used by some pioneers, notably Gustave Whitehead in his attempts to build a flying car.

== Aeroelasticity ==
Aeroelasticity is the natural tendency of any wing to flex under aerodynamic and inertial loads while in flight. Most designs seek to minimise the effects by making the wing structure as stiff as possible. However some have sought to use the effect to advantage.

A relatively early example is provided by the flying-wing gliders of the Horten brothers during the 1930s, whose wing tips flexed upwards in flight to act as stabilising surfaces.

The advent of the jet engine and transonic flight speeds brought a sharp increase in aerodynamic forces, made worse by the innate structural inefficiency of the swept wing, with the combination leading to dangerous characteristics in extreme flight conditions. The aeroisoclinic wing, developed by Geoffrey T. R. Hill in the 1950s and flown on the Short SB.4 Sherpa, was an attempt control the flexing in such a way as to maintain handling characteristics in all flight regimes. Similar aeroelastic tailoring was later applied to experimental forward-swept wings, where it is a necessity for any safe design.

== Lightweight aircraft ==
In 1948 the husband-and-wife team of Francis and Gertrude Rogallo developed a flexible kite which could be collapsed for storage. A key part of their design is the mixed use of tension lines and aerodynamic forces to stabilise and control the wing. The wing remains a constant shape in flight under wind pressure, and the lines are used to control its position.

Over the following years they developed the design and then Francis, working at NASA's Langley research centre, further developed the concept into proposals for crewed aircraft such as a space vehicle re-entry system.

Following a series of talks in 1959 and 1960 his ideas spread rapidly and two designs in particular, the Rogallo delta and the paraglider, were soon being used for kites, hang gliders and ultralight aircraft. Types with an engine backpack for the pilot are known as powered gliders. Although tested for spacecraft descent, no Rogallo types have been used by NASA.

=== Rogallo wing ===
Francis Rogallo evolved his trademark double-delta "parawing" during the 1950s. Unlike the earlier kites it uses several struts to maintain its planform, while still relying on air pressure from beneath to develop its conical upper profile.

=== Parafoil ===
Like the original Rogallo kites, the parafoil is fully collapsible. But unlike them it is double-skinned. Comprising an open-fronted aerofoil wing, it is held in shape by the pressure of air from in front. Many flexible ribs are needed to hold its aerofoil shape.

== Advanced concepts ==
In the 21st. century, new materials possessing both flexibility and strength are being experimented with, in order to merge control surfaces into the main wing surface. For example, a flexible wing flap has been test flown on a Gulfstream III. Flexible aerofoils and control surfaces operate by regular deformation of the wing material. Current challenges are centred around deforming the material to manipulate aerodynamic loads without exceeding the materials elastic limit.

The key benefits of flexible aerofoils are the reductions in aerodynamic drag. Current flight control mechanisms operate using hinges, which significantly disrupt the airflow and even generate vortices between the control surface and wing boundary. A flexible aerofoil can smoothly alter its shape to deflect the airflow, allowing the aerodynamic forces to be controlled without creating 'gaps' between hinges.

For smaller craft, the increasing sophistication of smart control systems is being combined with flexible technologies to create articulated wings which mimic the natural flexing of birds' wings in flight. It is now even practicable to use a bird-like flapping action to provide thrust as an ornithopter. The UTIAS Snowbird ornithopter of 2010 was human-powered.

The technology has been given various names, such as the morphing wing, smart airfoil or adaptive compliant wing.

== See also ==
- List of flexible-winged aircraft
