= List of flexible-winged aircraft =

This is a list of all flexible-winged aircraft, or aircraft which do not use rigid lifting surfaces (all of them hang gliders except the Antonov).

- Swedish Aerosport Mosquito
- Flylight Doodle Bug
- Pegasus Booster
- Antonov T-2M Maverick
- A-I-R Atos
- A-I-R Atos C 135
- A-I-R Atos C 160
- A-I-R Atos C Classique 135
- A-I-R Atos C Classique 160
- A-I-R Atos C+ 135
- A-I-R Atos C+ 160
- A-I-R Atos VS
- A-I-R Atos V
- A-I-R Atos V
- A-I-R Atos VQ
- A-I-R Atos VR/VR10
- A-I-R Atos VX

== Finsterwalder ==
(Finsterwalder GmbH, Munich, Germany)

- Finsterwalder Airfex
- Finsterwalder Bergfex
- Finsterwalder Funfex
- Finsterwalder Jetfex
- Finsterwalder Lightfex
- Finsterwalder Minifex
- Finsterwalder Perfex
- Finsterwalder Skyfex
- Finsterwalder Speedfex
- Finsterwalder Superfex
- Finsterwalder Topfex
- Finsterwalder Windfex
