= Finsterwald =

Finsterwald, meaning 'dark forest' in the German language, is a surname. Notable people with the surname include:

- Dow Finsterwald (1929–2022), American golfer
- Maxine Finsterwald (1906–1993), American dramatist and playwright
- Russ Finsterwald (1896–1962), American football and basketball player and coach

== See also ==
- Finsterwalder (disambiguation)
