= Aviation in the interwar period =

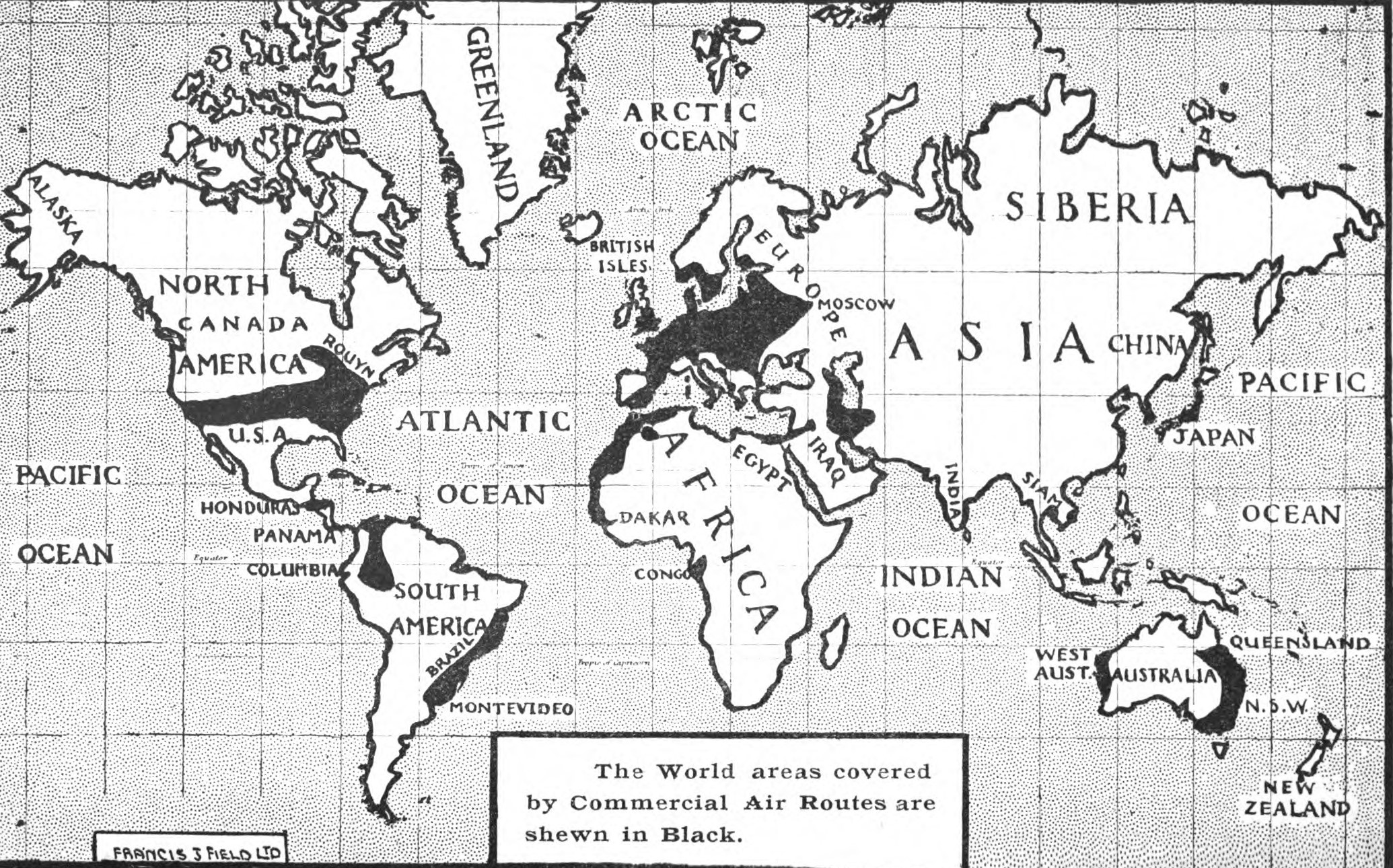
The areas of the world covered by commercial air routes in 1925

The Golden Age of Aviation was the period in the history of aviation between the end of World War I (1918) and the beginning of World War II (1939). It was characterised by a progressive change from the slow wood-and-fabric biplanes of World War I to fast, streamlined metal monoplanes, creating a revolution in both commercial and military aviation. By the outbreak of World War II in 1939 the biplane was all but obsolete. This revolution was made possible by the continuing development of lightweight aero engines of increasing power. The jet engine also began development during the 1930s but would not see operational use until later.

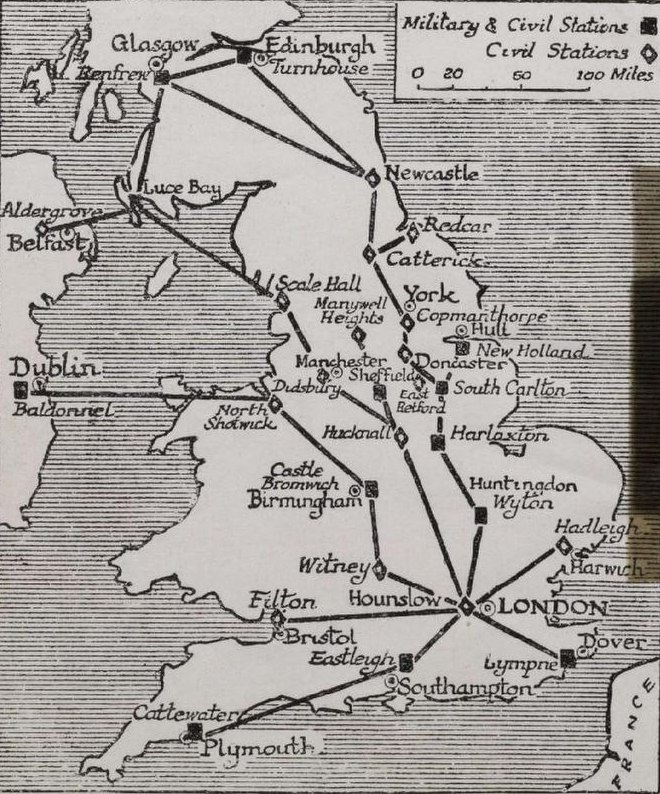
"Map of Air Routes and Landing Places in Great Britain, as temporarily arranged by the Air Ministry for civilian flying", published in 1919, showing Hounslow, near London, as the hub

During this period civil aviation became widespread and many daring and dramatic feats took place such as round-the-world flights, air races and barnstorming displays. Many commercial airlines were started during this period. Long-distance flights for the luxury traveller became possible for the first time; the early services used airships, but, after the Hindenburg disaster, airships fell out of use and the flying boat came to dominate.

In military aviation, the fast all-metal monoplane equipped with retractable landing gear — first placed into production by the Soviet Union with the Polikarpov I-16 of 1934 — emerged in such classic designs as the German Messerschmitt Bf 109 and the British Supermarine Spitfire, which would go on to see service in the coming war.

== Airships ==
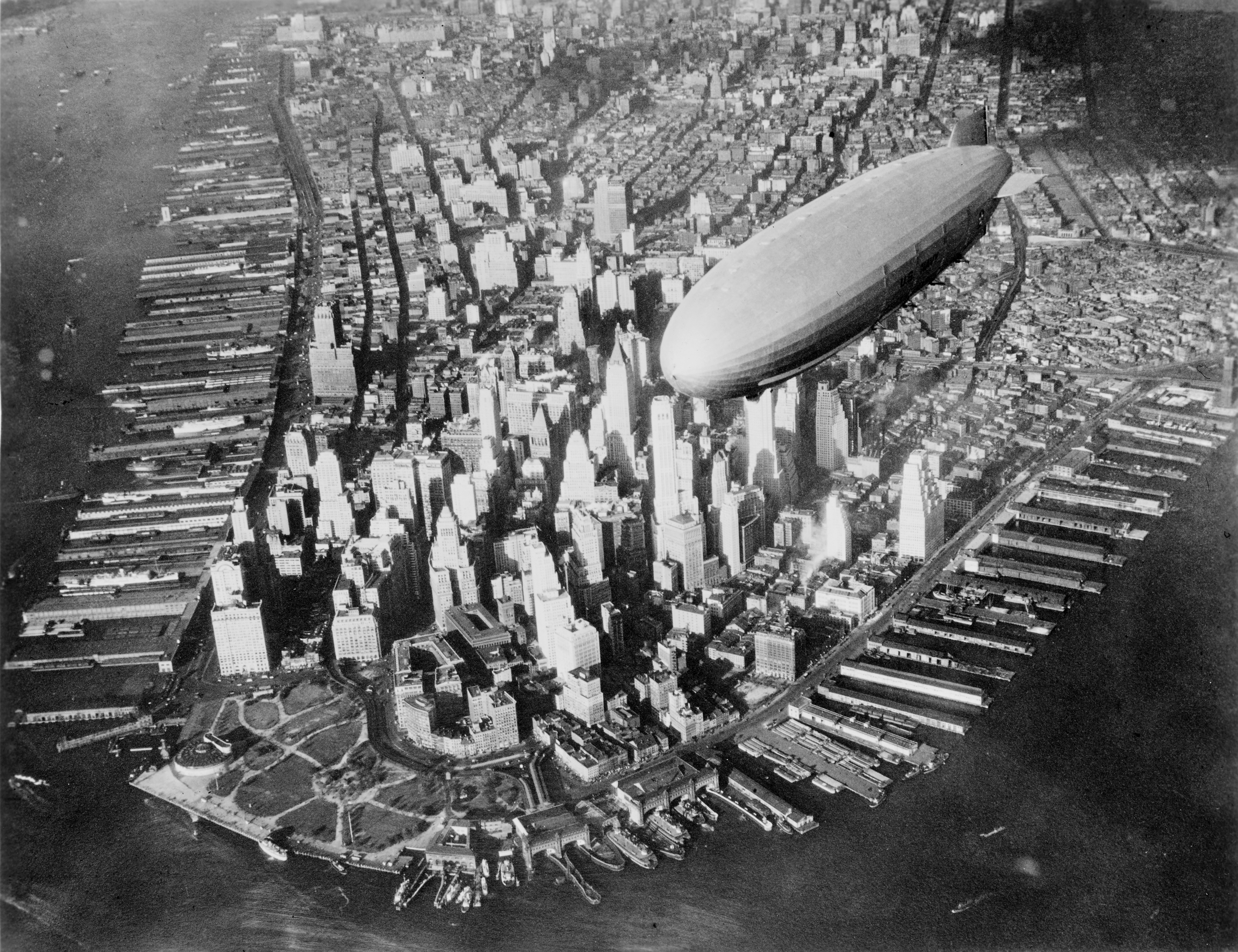
USS Akron over Lower Manhattan circa 1932

A number of nations operated airships between the two world wars, including Britain, the United States, Germany, Italy, France, the Soviet Union and Japan.

This period marked the great age of the airship. Before the First World War, pioneers such as the German Zeppelin company had begun passenger services, but the airships constructed in the years following were altogether larger and more famous. Large airships were also experimented with for military purposes, notably the American construction of two airborne aircraft carriers, but their large size made them vulnerable and the idea was dropped. This period also saw the introduction of non-flammable helium as a lifting gas by the United States, while the more dangerous hydrogen continued to be used since the United States had the only sources of the gas at that time, and would not export it.

In 1919 the British airship R34 flew a double crossing of the Atlantic and in 1926 the Italian semi-rigid airship, Norge was the first aircraft confirmed to fly over the North Pole.

The first American-built rigid airship, the USS Shenandoah, flew in 1923. The Shenandoah was the first to use helium, which was in such short supply that the one airship contained most of the world's reserves.

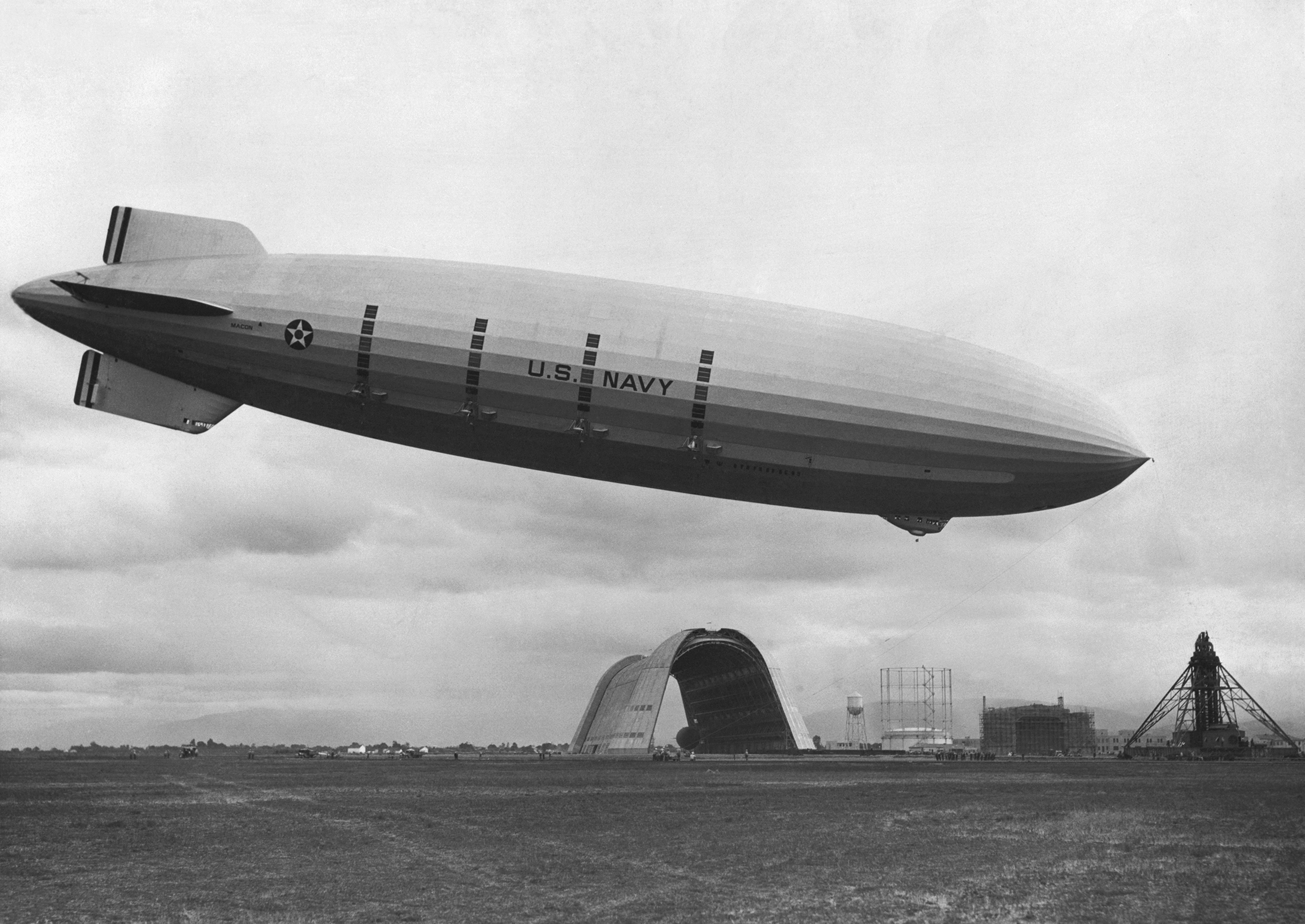
US Navy airship USS Macon (ZRS-5) over Moffett Field in 1933

The US Navy explored the idea of using airships as airborne aircraft carriers. Whereas the British had experimented with an aircraft "trapeze" on the R33 many years before, the Americans built hangars into two new airships and even designed specialist airplanes for them. The USS Akron and Macon were the world's largest airships at the time, with each carrying four F9C Sparrowhawk fighters in its hangar. Although successful, the idea was not taken further. By the time the Navy started to develop a sound doctrine for using these airships, both had been lost in accidents. More significantly, the seaplane had become more mature and was considered a better investment.

The Empire State Building, then the tallest building in the world, was completed in 1931 with a dirigible mast, in anticipation of passenger airship service.

The most famous airships today are the passenger-carrying rigid airships made by the German Zeppelin company, especially the Graf Zeppelin of 1928 and the Hindenburg of the year 1936.

The Graf Zeppelin was intended to stimulate interest in passenger airships, and was the largest airship that could be built in the company's existing shed. Its engines ran on blau gas, similar to propane, which was stored in large gas bags below the hydrogen cells. Since its density was similar to that of air, it avoided any weight change as fuel was used, and thus the need to vent hydrogen. The Graf Zeppelin became the first aircraft to fly all the way around the world.

Airship operations suffered a series of highly publicised fatal accidents, notably to the British R101 in 1930 and the German Hindenburg in 1937. Following the Hindenburg disaster, the age of the great airships was effectively over.

== Aeronautical advances ==
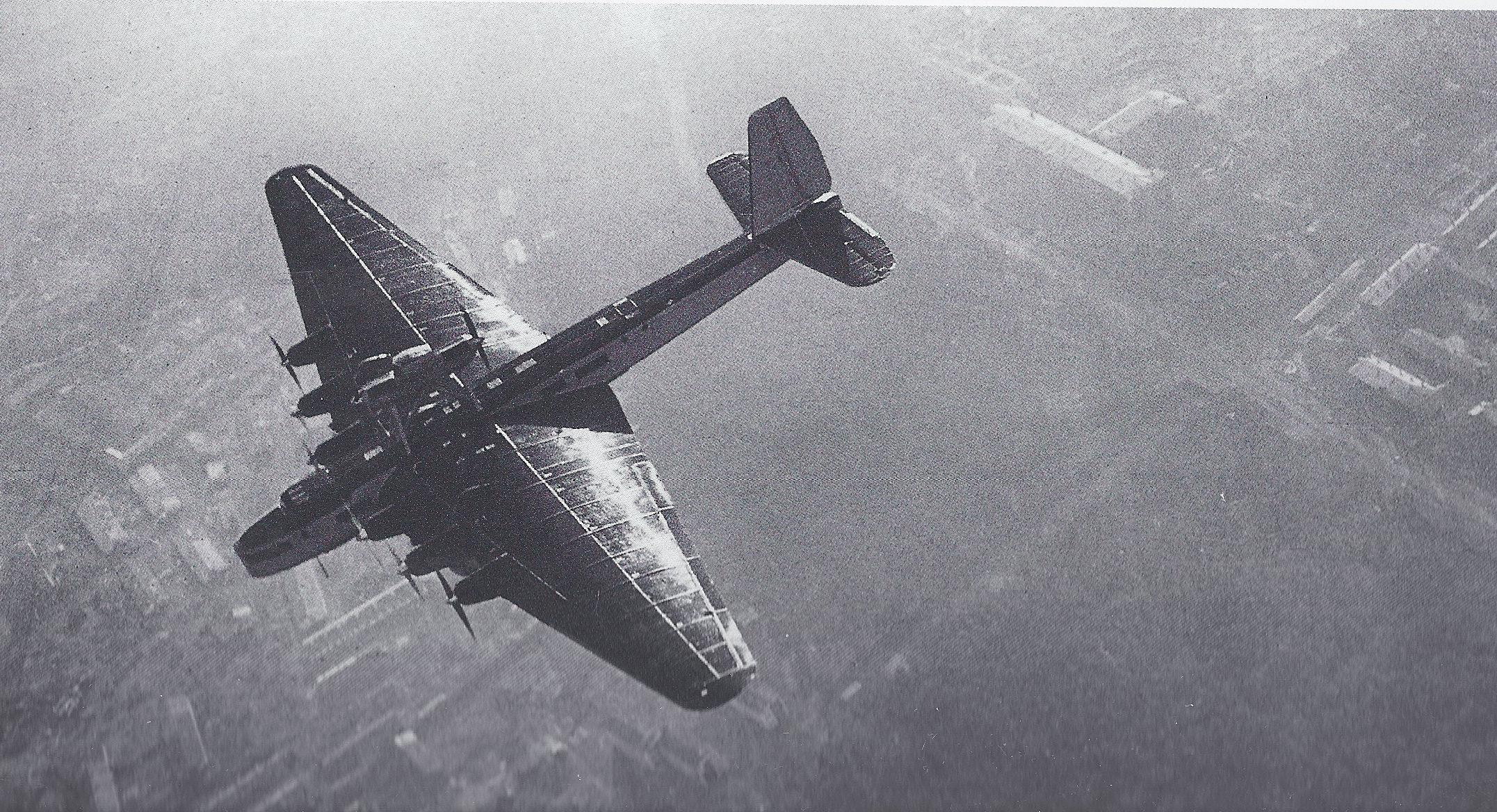
The Tupolev-designed Maksim Gorky, the largest fixed-wing aircraft built anywhere before World War II

During the late 1920s and early 1930s the available power from aero engines increased significantly, making possible the adoption of the fast cantilever-wing monoplane, originally pioneered as far back as late 1915. The ability to handle the high mechanical stresses imposed by this advanced form of airframe design philosophy suited the all-metal aircraft construction techniques pioneered by some earlier designers, and the increasing availability of high strength-to-weight aluminum alloys — first used by Hugo Junkers in 1916-17 as duralumin for his all-metal airframe designs — made it practical, allowing the earliest all-metal airliners like the Ford Trimotor designed by William Stout, and Junkers' own pioneering airliners like the Junkers F.13 to be built and accepted into service. When Andrei Tupolev likewise used the Junkers firm's techniques for all-metal aircraft construction, his designs ranged in size to the enormous, 63 meter (206 ft) wingspan eight-engined Soviet Maksim Gorki, the largest aircraft built anywhere before World War II.

The de Havilland DH.88 Comet racer of 1934 was one of the first designs to incorporate all the features of the modern fast monoplane, including; stressed-skin construction, a thin, clean, low-drag cantilever wing, retractable undercarriage, landing flaps, variable-pitch propeller and enclosed cockpit. Unusually for such a highly stressed wing at that time it was still made of wood, with the thin stressed-skin design made possible by the appearance of new high-strength synthetic resin adhesives.

The Comet was powered by two race-tuned but otherwise standard production de Havilland Gipsy Six engines with a combined output of 460 hp (344 kW). This compares for example on the one hand to the single 180 hp engine fitted to the Junkers CL.I all-metal monoplane of 1918 and to the 1,172 hp Rolls-Royce Merlin C development engine which powered the prototype Spitfire in 1936.

In the 1930s development of the jet engine began in Germany and in England. In England Frank Whittle patented a design for a jet engine in 1930 and towards the end of the decade began developing an engine. In Germany Hans von Ohain patented his version of a jet engine in 1936 and began developing a similar engine. The two men were unaware of the other's work, and both Germany and Britain would go on to develop jet aircraft by the end of World War II. In Hungary, György Jendrassik began construction of the world's first turboprop engine.

== Civil aviation ==
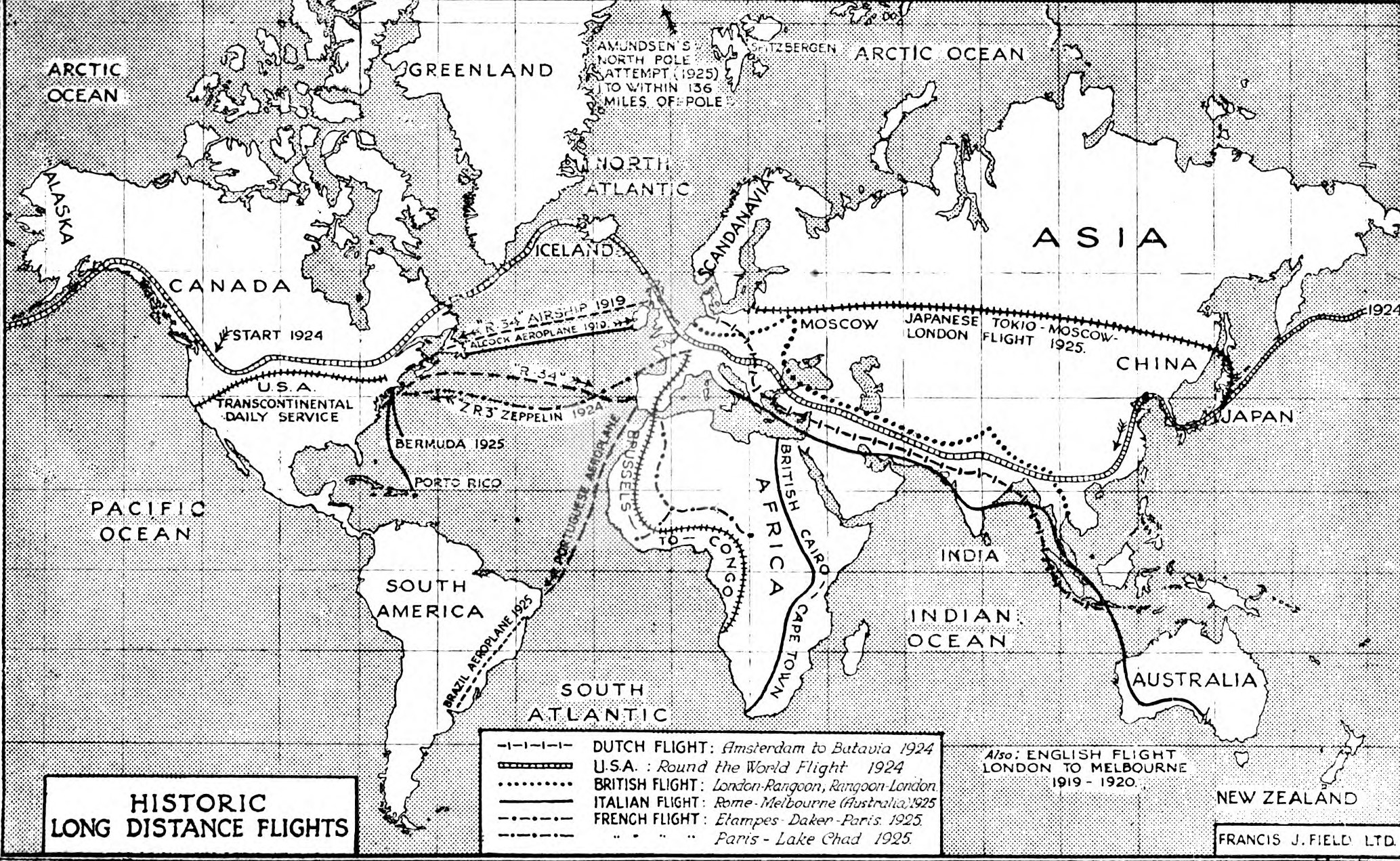
Long distance flights and records as of 1925 by nationality

Many aviation firsts occurred during this period. Long-distance flights by pioneers such as Sir Charles Kingsford Smith, Alcock and Brown, Charles Lindbergh and Amy Johnson blazed a trail which new commercial airlines soon followed.

Many of these new routes had few facilities such as modern runways, and this era also became the age of the great flying boats such as the German Dornier Do X, American Sikorsky S-42 and British Short Empire, which could operate from any stretch of clear, calm water.

This period also saw the growth of barnstorming and other aerobatic displays which produced a corps of skilled pilots who would contribute to military air forces during World War II on all sides of the conflict.

Recreational gliding flourished, particularly in Germany through Rhön-Rossitten. In the US, the Schweizer brothers manufactured sport sailplanes to meet the new demand. Sailplanes continued to evolve through the 1930s and sport gliding became the main application of gliders.

== Military aviation ==
In military aviation, the fast all-metal monoplane emerged slowly. During the 1920s the high-wing parasol monoplane vied with the traditional biplane. It was not until the arrival of the American Boeing P-26 Peashooter in 1932 — nearly fifteen years after the first low-wing fighter to enter limited military service, the all-metal airframe Junkers D.I had entered service with the Luftstreitkräfte in 1918 — that the low-wing monoplane began to gain favour, reaching its classic form in such designs. These were pioneered in late 1933 by the Soviet Union with the Polikarpov I-16 fighter, powered initially with an American Wright Cyclone nine-cylinder radial engine. Within only a few years after the I-16's first flights, the German Messerschmitt Bf 109 of 1935 and the British Supermarine Spitfire of 1936 were also flying, powered by new and powerful liquid-cooled vee-twelve engines respectively from Daimler-Benz and Rolls-Royce. The rotary engines common in the First World War quickly fell out of favour, being replaced by more powerful stationary air-cooled radial engines such as the Pratt and Whitney Wasp series.
