= Junkers J 2 =

Prototype fighter aircraft by Junkers

J 2
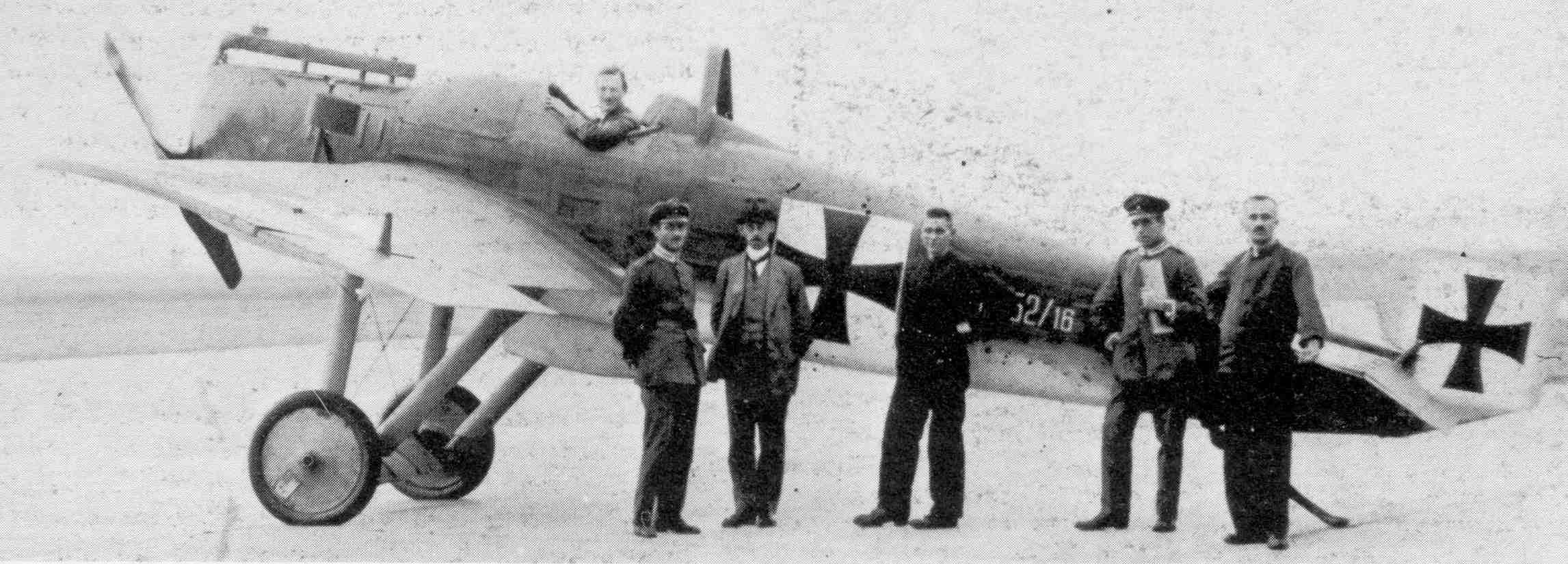
- Third-built example of the Junkers J.2, E.252/16

General information
- Type: Fighter prototype
- National origin: German Empire
- Manufacturer: Junkers und Companie
- Primary user: Luftstreitkrafte
- Number built: 6

History
- Introduction date: 1916
- First flight: 11 July 1916
- Retired: 1916
- Developed from: Junkers J 1

The Junkers J 2 was the first all-metal aircraft intended as a dedicated military aircraft design, the first all-metal aircraft meant to be a fighter aircraft, and was the direct descendant of the pioneering J 1 all-metal aircraft technology demonstrator design of 1915.

== Background ==
Only some two weeks after the last known recorded flight, on 18 January 1916, of the J 1 "technology demonstrator" design of 1915, the Junkers firm had impressed Hauptmann Felix Wagenführ, head of IdFlieg' Prüfanstalt und Werft der Fliegertruppe ("Test Establishment and Workshop of the Aviation Troops") department, enough for him to contract the Junkers firm to build six all-metal monoplanes, intended as fighter prototypes. Each was to be powered by the Mercedes D.II inline engine (as the J 1 had been), and armed with one 7.92 mm (.312 in) lMG 08 Spandau synchronized machine gun. The aircraft were allocated IdFlieg serial numbers E.250/16 to E.255/16. The specification was for an aircraft that had:

- A top speed of 145 kilometres per hour (90 mph).
- A flight duration of 90 minutes.
- The ability to climb to 3,000 metres (9,800 ft) within 20 minutes.

The contract also specified that "the greatest manoeuvrability and nimbleness in flight must be achieved by the aircraft", expressing a possible concern of the German governmental agency concerning the use of the heavy electrical steel sheet that made up the earlier J 1's structure. Junkers began wind tunnel and design work promptly upon receipt of the contract, and, by the end of the spring of 1916, the first example was completed.

== Design ==
The Junkers J 2's pioneering "unitized" forward fuselage structure, integrating the wing roots, engine mount and cockpit

The J 2 differed from the J 1 in having a cowling that almost entirely enclosed the engine, a rounded upper and lower fuselage section instead of the rectangular section of the J 1., and a narrower and deeper ventral radiator enclosure, and had a horizontal stabilizer planform shape that would become familiar on later, all-duralumin Junkers monoplane designs to be built during 1917–18. The "all-moving" rudder still possessed no fixed fin, like the J 1. A faired-in headrest was provided for, as well as the possibly pioneering appearance of a "roll bar" for an open-cockpit aircraft, placed above the headrest for additional pilot protection in case of the aircraft overturning during landing. The landing gear was of the usual vee-type, but taller than that of the J 1's, and having the upper ends of the legs anchored not onto the lower longerons as on the J 1, but to the first wing rib bay beyond the wing root, with a long tailskid that emerged from the lower rear fuselage directly below the stabilizer's leading edge root. The wings had at least three different airfoil changes between root and tip, and had sections of them electrically roll-welded for stronger, more continuous bonding for greater strength. The resulting aircraft was intended to be smaller than the J 1 demonstrator, but with its steel structure, it almost equalled the J 1's completed weight.

One feature pioneered in the J 2 that would also be used in later all-metal monoplanes designed and built by Junkers in World War I, was a "unitized" forward fuselage structure, combining the engine mount, wing roots and cockpit framing into a single structure.

== Operational history ==
The first production example of the J.2, (serial number E.250/16) was delivered to Adlershof on 2 July 1916, and started its IdFlieg-mandated static load testing. Otto Mader, one of the J 2's designers, then promised IdFlieg that the following example, E.251/16, would have even greater structural strength than that of the E.250's airframe. Leutnant Theodor Mallinckrodt, the pilot who had first "hopped" the J 1 some seven months previously, flew E.251/16 for the type's maiden flight on 11 July 1916. Mallinckrodt gave the aircraft a good overall evaluation, judging it as "very manoeuverable", with good turning qualities and safe aerodynamic behaviour. A short time later, IdFlieg test pilots Unteroffiziers Wendeler and Max Schade, began performing full flight evaluation tests on the six examples of the J 2 as they arrived at Adlershof .

Schade would eventually take one of the test aircraft on a flight from Berlin to Dessau later in the summer of 1916, achieving a speed of 180 kilometres per hour (110 mph) with the aircraft, which was some 16 kilometres per hour (9.9 mph) faster than the contemporary French Nieuport 11, but, as the J 2 test aircraft still seemed to come up short in climbing performance tests when evaluated against wood structure designs like the then new Albatros D.I, the steel structure of the J 2 made it just too heavy to be able to compete in air combat over the Front.

At least one example (E.253/16) of the J 2 was fitted with slightly longer wings and matching longer ailerons, possibly in an effort to decrease the wing loading of the initial J 2 design, and at least one of the aircraft was fitted with the then-new 119-kilowatt (160 hp) Mercedes D.III engine, achieving 200 kilometres per hour (120 mph) at full throttle.

=== Shortcomings of an "iron aircraft" ===
Despite the attempts to improve the J 2's performance and handling, by late in the summer of 1916, Hugo Junkers had come to the realization that the continued use of sheet electrical steel was no longer practical for aircraft construction, writing in his diary that:

"As a result of the first (J 1) and second (J 2) aircraft, one would ascertain that the aerodynamic efficiency was very good. We thought we [the Junkers designers] were over the hill. This, unfortunately, was not the case. We had to start again from the very beginning. The reason was that, in spite of the favorable horizontal speed, the aircraft could not meet the military climb specifications...we had to develop an aircraft that not only had low drag for ease of manoeuver in the horizontal plane, but that could climb well-an aircraft with a low weight to power ratio...

...This could not be achieved with iron, and we had to choose a new material...light-weight metal. But not only the choice of iron had resulted in high weight. We had built too heavy because we wanted a safe aircraft and partially because we had not extracted the optimum structural strength from the material".

Unteroffizier Schade, after making the record Berlin-Dessau flight, would later lose his life in a crash, from entering a spin on 23 September 1916 in one of the J 2s, and this event, combined with the substandard climbing performance of the J 2 series of test aircraft, caused IdFlieg to withdraw any further governmental support (effectively ending the J 2's contract) for the Junkers firm's advanced monoplane designs until a lighter metal, such as duralumin, was selected for such designs. The first attempt to use duralumin for airframe construction by the Junkers firm was the never-completed J 3 mid-wing, rotary engine-powered, aluminum tubing fuselage single-seat monoplane design, of which only the corrugated sheet duralumin-covered wing structures and "bare" tubular fuselage framing, primarily as an engineering exercise, were finished shortly before the end of 1916.

It is also thought that the contrasting promise of the advanced, low drag features of the Junkers monoplane aircraft designs, versus the Junkers firm's usage of experimental non-traditional sheet metal materials, and the firm's habit of almost constant experimentation obstructing any future hope of producing its advanced designs for the Luftstreitkräfte, compelled IdFlieg to create the Junkers-Fokker Aktiengesellschaft, abbreviated as Jfa and pronounced as if spelled "iefa" in German, on 20 October 1917, to allow Anthony Fokker, who even flew one of the J 2 aircraft in tests late in December 1916, to improve the future producibility of the advanced designs of the Junkers firm.

== Operators ==
German Empire

- Luftstreitkrafte

== Specifications ==
General characteristics

- Crew: 1
- Length: 7.43 m (24 ft 4.5 in)
- Wingspan: 11.70 m (38 ft 4.67 in)
- Height: 3.13 m (10 ft 3.25 in)
- Wing area: 19.00 m^{2} (204.52 sq ft)
- Empty weight: 920 kg (2,028 lb)
- Gross weight: 1,165 kg (2,568 lb)
- Powerplant: 1 × Mercedes D.III water-cooled engine , 119 kW (160 hp)

Performance

- Maximum speed: 200 km/h (124 mph, 108 kn)
- Range: 615 km (382 mi, 332 nmi)
- Service ceiling: 4,500 m (14,760 ft)

Armament

- 1 × 7.92 mm (.312 in) lMG 08/15 machine gun
