= Junkers J 1 =

1915 experimental aircraft

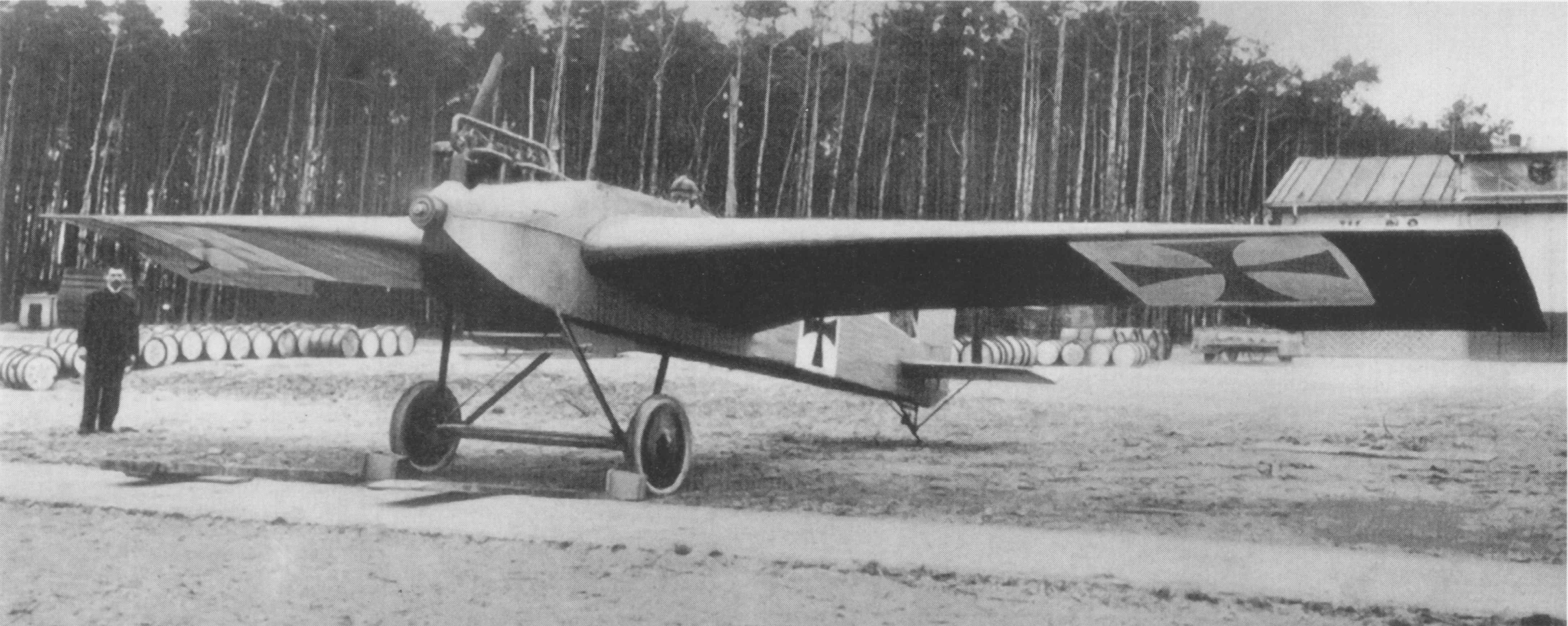
- The Junkers J.1 Blechesel

General information
- Type: experimental/Pioneer aircraft
- Manufacturer: Junkers & Co
- Status: Retired
- Primary user: Luftstreitkräfte
- Number built: 1

History
- Manufactured: 1915
- First flight: 12 December 1915
- Retired: 1916

The Junkers J 1, nicknamed the Blechesel (Tin Donkey or Sheet Metal Donkey), was an experimental monoplane aircraft developed by Junkers. It was the first all-metal aircraft in the world. Manufactured early in the First World War, an era in which aircraft designers relied largely on fabric-covered wooden structures braced with wires, the J 1 was a revolutionary development in aircraft design, making extensive use of metal in its structure and in its outer surface.

The J 1 originated from the work of pioneering aeronautical designer Hugo Junkers. The experimental aircraft never received an "A" or "E-series" monoplane designation from IdFlieg, the Army inspectorate of military aircraft and The Imperial German Air Service (Die Fliegertruppen des deutschen Kaiserreiches). The aircraft was known only by its Junkers factory model number of J 1 and should not be confused with the later, armoured all-metal Junkers J 4 sesquiplane, accepted by the later Luftstreitkräfte as the Junkers J.I (using a Roman numeral), from the category of armored combat aircraft established by IdFlieg.

On 12 December 1915, the aircraft made its brief maiden flight, flown by Leutnant Theodor Mallinckrodt of Flieger-Ersatz-Abteilung 1 (FEA 1), during which an altitude of almost 3 m (9.8 ft) was reached. Greater altitudes and performance were achieved during subsequent flights. By the end of January 1916, Junkers had been given a contract to further develop his all-metal concept and the later Junkers J 2 single-seat fighter, which would never see front line service, followed the J 1. It is believed that the Junkers J 1 was not flown again after January 1916. In 1926, it was placed on static display at the Deutsches Museum in Munich. In December 1944, the J 1 was destroyed during an Allied bombing raid on the city.

== Development ==
=== Background ===
Amongst the earlier pioneers and innovators in the field of aviation was the German engineer and aeronautical designer Hugo Junkers. During his early career he had established his engineering credentials outside of the field of aviation; Junker's innovations had included the invention of a type of calorimeter and in the construction of internal combustion engines. Sometime after 1897, Junkers was first introduced to the principles and field of aviation after having received details of the concept of heavier-than-air travel from Hans Reissner, a colleague and fellow professor at the Technische Hochschule in Aachen, where Junkers held the chair of Professor of Thermodynamics.

In 1907 Reissner approached Junkers, seeking his collaboration in the design and construction of an early monoplane aircraft; although this first effort, which flew in 1909, did not meet with much success, it was this project which has been credited with leading to Junkers pursuing a career as an aeronautical designer. Five years later Reissner, with Junkers' help, began construction of his all-metal canard design, which he named the Ente (Duck) which first flew on 7 August 1912. Junkers' firm manufactured portions of Reissner's design, including the flying surfaces and radiator. The problems encountered in constructing the Ente had led to Junkers spending considerable amounts of time working on the problems of airframe design, including an examination of the options for the elimination of the practice of exterior bracing of airframes. During 1910 he patented the design for a fully cantilevered thick aerofoil tailless aircraft (now known as a flying wing) in Germany.

During 1910 Junkers received a grant for the construction of a wind tunnel at his research facilities in Aachen; this led to the initiation of an aerodynamic research programme that would, five years later, contribute to the design of the Junkers J 1. In 1911, Junkers resigned his professorship to dedicate his efforts to his Dessau-based engine company; he returned to Aachen upon the completion of the wind tunnel. It was not until 1915 that Junkers was able to fully devote his time to the design and manufacture of an aircraft; it was at this point that he opened a research institute, the Forschungsanstalt Professor Junkers, which was assigned responsibility for the design and development of a series of fully cantilevered all-metal monoplanes.

Upon the outbreak of the First World War in August 1914, Junkers decided to direct his efforts towards projects which would have potential military value. The majority of aircraft designers were relatively conservative and, save for some isolated examples, no advances were achieved; according to aviation historian Charles Gibbs-Smith, the pioneering work of Hugo Junkers was a notable exception. It was Junkers' efforts, along with those of collaborators such as engineers Otto Reuter, Otto Mader, head of the Forschungsanstalt and Hans Steudel, director of Junkers' structural materials and testing department, that the J 1 would be produced as a private venture, in the form of what would now be termed a technology demonstrator.

=== Concept and contract ===
Junkers and the Forschungsanstalt, commenced engineering work to realize his concept for the creation of aircraft designs that would dispense with drag-producing exterior bracing. His work on Reissner's Ente design had convinced him of the necessity to use metal as the main structural material. Although duralumin, which had been invented by Alfred Wilm six years earlier, was apparently the ideal metal alloy for aircraft construction it was prone to flaking and other undesirable characteristics when worked in sheet metal form. The early all-metal aircraft designs produced by Junkers used sheets of heavier electrical steel, similar to the types of ferrous sheet metals that are typically used in laminated-core AC electrical transformers.

On 8 June 1915, Junkers began to acquire the tooling for the J 1. According to aviation author Hugh Cowin, while it has often mis-reported as having been produced to a specification for an aircraft intended for military service, the J 1 was instead intended to be produced purely as a research aircraft, that would lead to the production of a later line of all-metal monoplane fighter aircraft. On 12 December 1915, the J 1 made a short flight at Dessau and was then sent to the Army proving ground at Döberitz for testing, where it made the first real flight on 18 January 1916.

== Design ==
The Junkers J 1 was an experimental mid-wing monoplane that incorporated various modern features, having a cantilever wing and an entirely metal structure. Externally, the J 1 was an exceptionally clean and well-proportioned aircraft. Sheet steel panels 42 cm (17 in)-wide, reinforced in load-bearing areas by additional sheets of corrugated steel within the comparatively-smoother outer envelope, were wrapped around the fuselage to form its external covering. This arrangement was the first use of an all-metal stressed-skin construction. The rudder was of an "all-flying" design, with no fixed fin and the tail surface structure and covering also consisted of formed sheet steel, much like the wings. The angle of incidence of the stabilizer could be adjusted on the ground.

The basic structure of the J 1 was built up around its center fuselage section and the integral inboard stub wing, functioning as the aircraft's wing roots. The stub wings served as attachment points for Junkers' patented spar-less wings, which consisted of short span truss-tires sections successively layered outwards from the stub wings. Other elements fixed onto the centre section include the nose section, rear fuselage, and tail unit. Atypically for the era, the wing lacked any exterior bracing struts or wires; the only use of external bracing was for support of the horizontal stabilisers and the undercarriage. The internal structure made use of welded strip-steel angle stock and I-beam sections in conjunction with portions of steel tubing to form its main internal structure.

The innovative cantilever structure for the wings were also covered in chordwise sheet steel panels. The wing root had a depth of about 75 per cent of the height of the fuselage at the root's thickest point, and the wing had at least three aerofoil changes, along with tapering of the leading and trailing edge angles between the wing root and the wing tip. These changes in wing section would become a Junkers design hallmark on the later 1918 Junkers D.I. single-seat all-metal fighter design, which was covered with Wilm's duralumin, corrugated as first attempted with the Junkers J 3 airframe exercise of 1916–1917. The J 1 also relied on steel panels with span-wise corrugations as a structural element hidden under the smooth outer metal covering to increase the wing's strength.

The 90 kW (120 hp) Mercedes D.II six-cylinder liquid-cooled inline engine selected to power the J-1 was housed within a simple, clamshell-like horizontally split cowling enclosing the engine's crankcase and lower cylinder block. It featured an advanced engine radiator layout for the era, having placed the radiator in a ventral position underneath the forward fuselage; the front of the radiator housing's opening was located just behind the front gear strut's attachment points to the fuselage, and with the radiator's housing having a width equal to that of the fuselage above it.

== Operational history ==
=== Flight testing ===
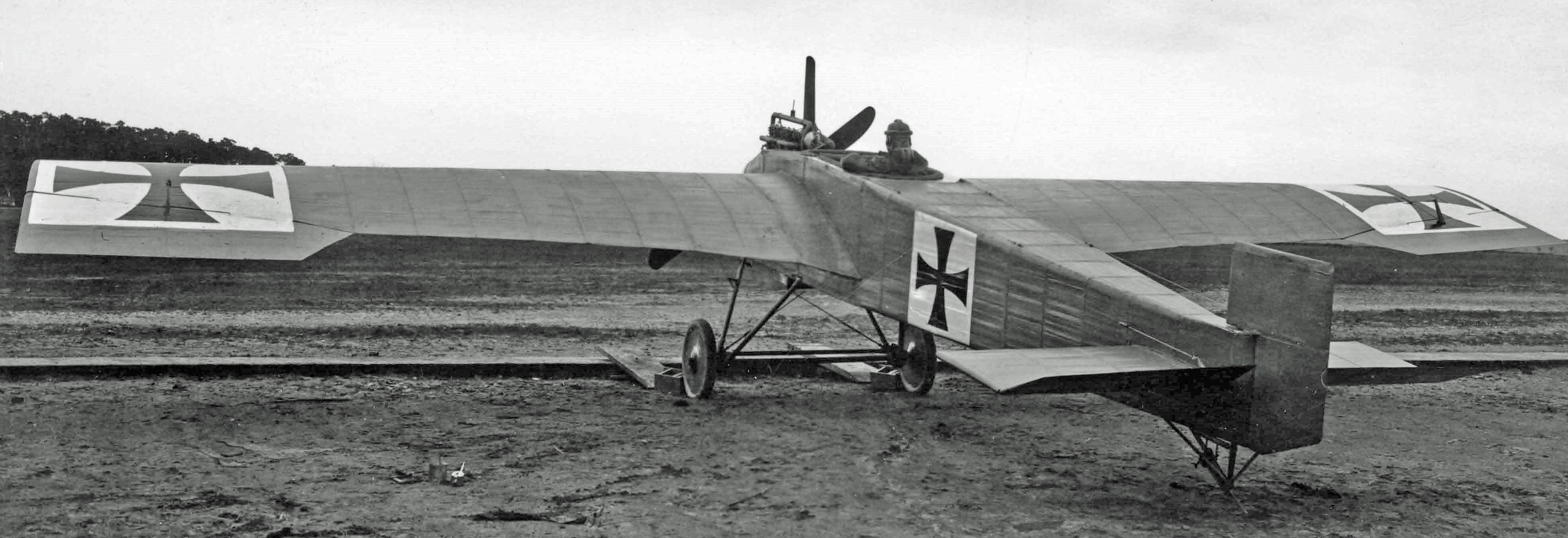
The Junkers J 1 at FEA 1, Döberitz, Germany, undergoing preparations for its maiden flight

Before the Junkers J 1 could fly, IdFlieg, the Inspektorat der Fliegertruppen, the aviation administration arm of the German Army, required that static load tests be performed on the J 1. This involved the usual static loading trials being carried out on the J 1's structure using sandbags, loading and strength tests, as well as a test of the static thrust that would be obtained with the engine and propeller combination. On 3 December 1915, these static tests were completed, followed by engine thrust tests. The Junkers factory did not yet possess a test field at Dessau, so the J 1 was transported to the Fliegerersatzabteilung 1 (FEA 1) airfield in Döberitz, just west of Berlin, for its flight testing.

On 12 December 1915, Leutnant Theodor Mallinckrodt of FEA 1 was assigned to taxi and briefly "hop" the J 1, which he managed to do up to almost a 3 m (9.8 ft) altitude. During the course of this small flight, a gust of wind caught the starboard wing during the "hop" as the J 1 descended, resulting in the port wing tip scraping the ground and the port side of the J 1's fuselage was correspondingly bent inwards towards the rear of the wing mount. Testing was delayed while repairs were made through the holiday period at the end of 1915, after which a further round of static load tests were carried out to test the repairs.

On 18 January 1916, the second flight for the J 1 was carried out at Döberitz by Gefreiter (Private) Paul Arnold of the FEA 1 unit. The J 1 attained an altitude of only 80 m (260 ft), following a 200 m (660 ft) take-off run, as the variable incidence stabilizer had been incorrectly set in the mistaken belief that the J 1 was tail-heavy. Later that day, after the stabilizer was adjusted to give level flight trim, Leutnant Mallinckrodt performed another attempt, this time reaching a maximum height of 900 m (3,000 ft) from a shorter take-off run. Handling was determined to be acceptable and the aircraft was reportedly stable during flight.

On 19 January, Mallinckrodt once again took the J 1 up for its only known "high performance" flight test, which consisted of a 7 km (4.3 mi) course and covered altitudes from 200–300 m (660–980 ft). During this flight, Mallinckrodt reached top speed of 170 km/h (110 mph). As a consequence of military interest in Junkers' design, the J 1 was compared to the popular Rumpler C.I two-seat, armed observation biplane during flight testing. The J 1 was 30 km/h (19 mph) faster, even though the Rumpler biplane was powered by the more powerful Mercedes D.III engine. Given the lighter weight of the Rumpler's wood-and-fabric airframe, it was capable of a much greater rate of climb rate than the J 1, handicapped by its experimental steel structure.

== Analysis ==
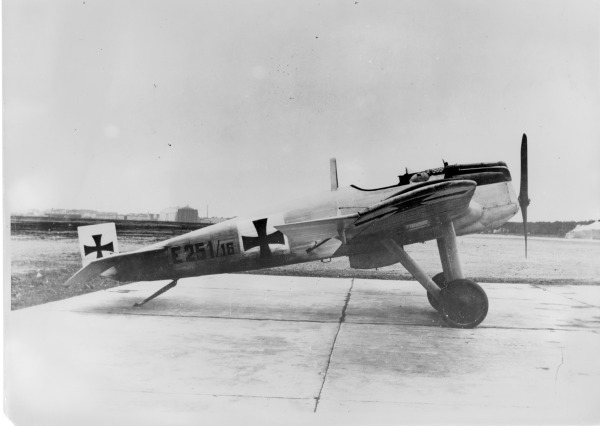
Example of a Junkers J 2

The flight performance of the J 1 were evaluated during the test programme. Information was gathered from the pilots and the ground crew that serviced it. Apparently, the welded construction of the aircraft had problems on the ground that had been encountered before. In conjunction with its sluggish performance in the air, some individuals mocked the J 1 with derogatory names, the most prominent of these being the Blechesel (Tin Donkey or Sheet Metal Donkey). Some figures, such as the Dutch aviation pioneer, Anthony Fokker, praised the potential of the aircraft and the principles demonstrated, pointing to the higher speed and greater durability of prospective aircraft using such construction. The handling of the J 1 was the subject of derision by Junkers' critics but the military remained supportive of refinement of the concept. By the end of January 1916, Junkers had been given a contract and the Junkers J 2 single-seat fighter followed, which would never see front line service. The J 2 bore a superficial similarity to the J 1, being more aerodynamically refined and slightly smaller, yet the two aircraft had similar structures.

=== Preservation and recreations ===
It is believed that the Junkers J 1 was not flown again after January 1916. The aircraft survived the First World War and was placed on static display in 1926 at the Deutsches Museum in Munich. During the Second World War, in December 1944, the J 1 was destroyed during an Allied bombing raid on the city. A metal scale display model of the J 1 was built by a group of Junkers' factory workers following its initial flights and was exhibited at the Franklin Institute in Philadelphia after the war; its fate is not known. During 2015, the Junkers Technology Museum in Dessau, Germany, announced that they intended to construct a full-scale replica of the pioneering J 1. To fund this, financing was sought through a crowdfunding campaign on Kickstarter.

== Specifications ==
Data from Wagner and Nowarra (1971). German Combat Planes: A Comprehensive Survey and History of the Development of German Military Aircraft from 1914 to 1945.

General characteristics

- Crew: one
- Length: 8.64 m (28 ft 4 in)
- Wingspan: 12.92 m (42 ft 5 in)
- Height: 3.11 m (10 ft 2 in)
- Wing area: 24.34 m^{2} (262.0 sq ft)
- Empty weight: 920 kg (2,028 lb)
- Gross weight: 1,080 kg (2,381 lb)
- Powerplant: 1 × Mercedes D.II 6-cyl. water-cooled in-line piston engine, 90 kW (120 hp)

Performance

- Maximum speed: 170 km/h (110 mph, 92 kn)
