= Finsterwalder =

German aircraft manufacturer

Finsterwalder GmbH
- Company type: Private company
- Industry: Aerospace
- Founded: 1974
- Founder: Thomas Finsterwalder
- Headquarters: Munich, Germany
- Products: Hang gliders, Paragliders and accessories
- Divisions: Charly-Products
- Website: www.finsterwalder-charly.de

Finsterwalder GmbH is a German aircraft manufacturer specializing in hang gliders, paragliders and related accessories. The company is headquartered in Munich.

Most of the company's hang glider designs are intended to be folded down to a small size for man-packing up mountains.

Finsterwalder GmbH is made up of two divisions. The headquarters is in Munich and focuses on hang glider design, production and repair along with helmet design and production. Charly Products is located in Seeg and produces paragliders, harnesses and rescue systems.

== History ==
The company was formed in 1974 by Thomas Finsterwalder as a kayak design and production enterprise. The first hang glider designed and produced was the Finsterwalder Bergfex (English: Mountain Freak), which weighed 11 kg (24 lb) and could be broken down in 8 minutes to a package 1.80 m (5.9 ft) long for ground transport.

In 1985 the factory and all equipment were destroyed by a fire, delaying production until the following year.

Charly Products logo

In 1990 the company bought out Charly Products adding paragliders and parachute systems to the company line. Since the take-over the company has done business as Finsterwalder & Charly. In 1994 Charly started a partnership with Nova Paragliders.

== Aircraft ==
Summary of aircraft built by Finsterwalder
Model name	First flight	Number built	Type
Finsterwalder Airfex			hang glider
Finsterwalder Bergfex		300+	hang glider
Finsterwalder Funfex			hang glider
Finsterwalder Jetfex			hang glider
Finsterwalder Lightfex			hang glider
Finsterwalder Minifex			hang glider
Finsterwalder Perfex			hang glider
Finsterwalder Skyfex		6 prototypes only	hang glider
Finsterwalder Speedfex			hang glider
Finsterwalder Superfex		680	hang glider
Finsterwalder Topfex			hang glider
Finsterwalder Windfex		900	hang glider
