= John W. Dickenson =

Australian inventor (1934–2023)

- Born: John Wallace Dickenson; 22 January 1934
- Died: 5 July 2023 (aged 89)
- Occupation: inventor
- Known for: modern hang glider

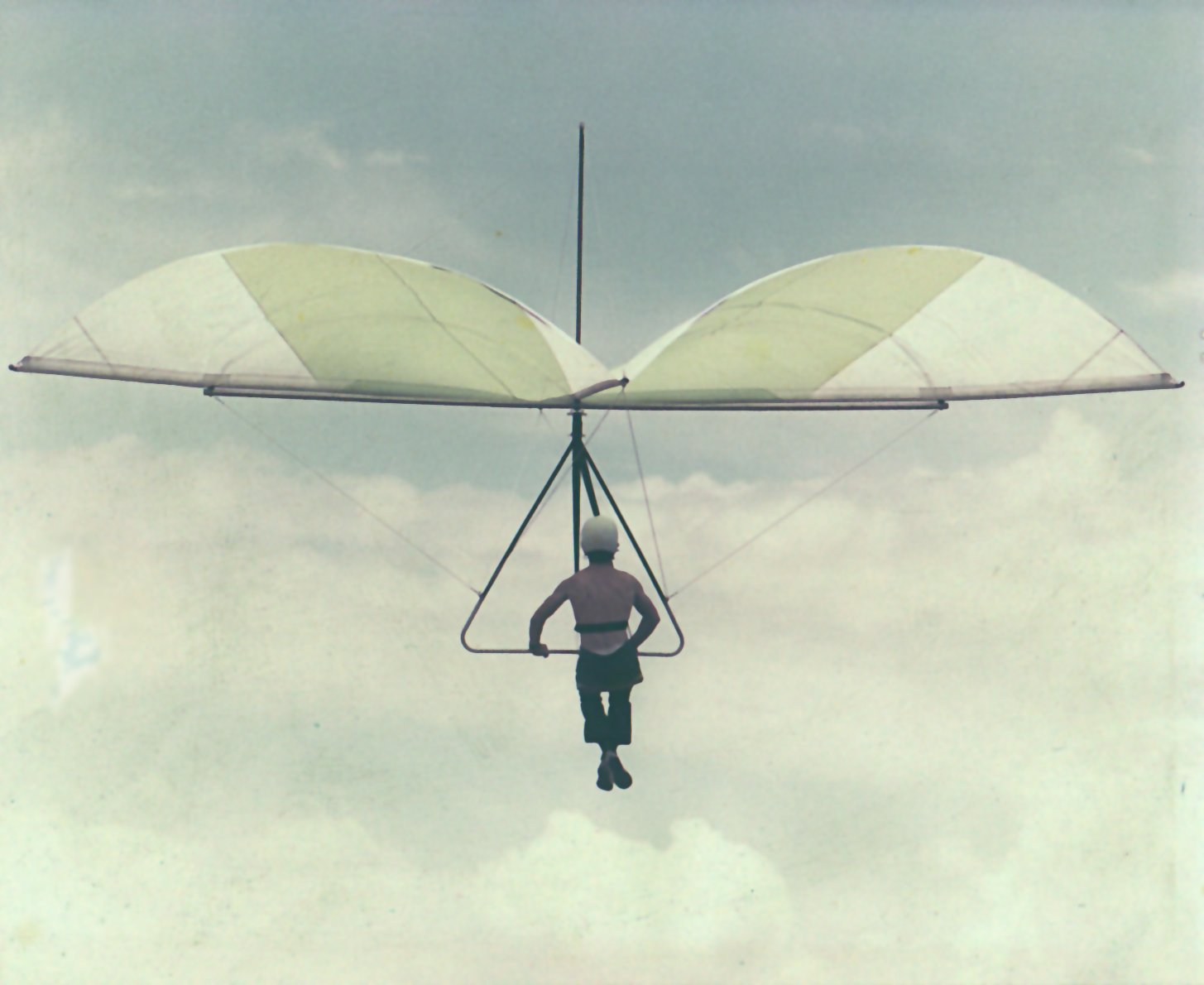
A 'Standard' hang glider, 1975.

John Wallace Dickenson AM (22 January 1934 – 5 July 2023) was an Australian inventor, who was best known for helping develop liquid flow measuring devices and designing a successful hang glider configuration, for which he was awarded the Gold Air Medal, the highest award given by the Fédération Aéronautique Internationale, the world governing body for air sports, aeronautics and astronautics world records.

== Ski kite ==
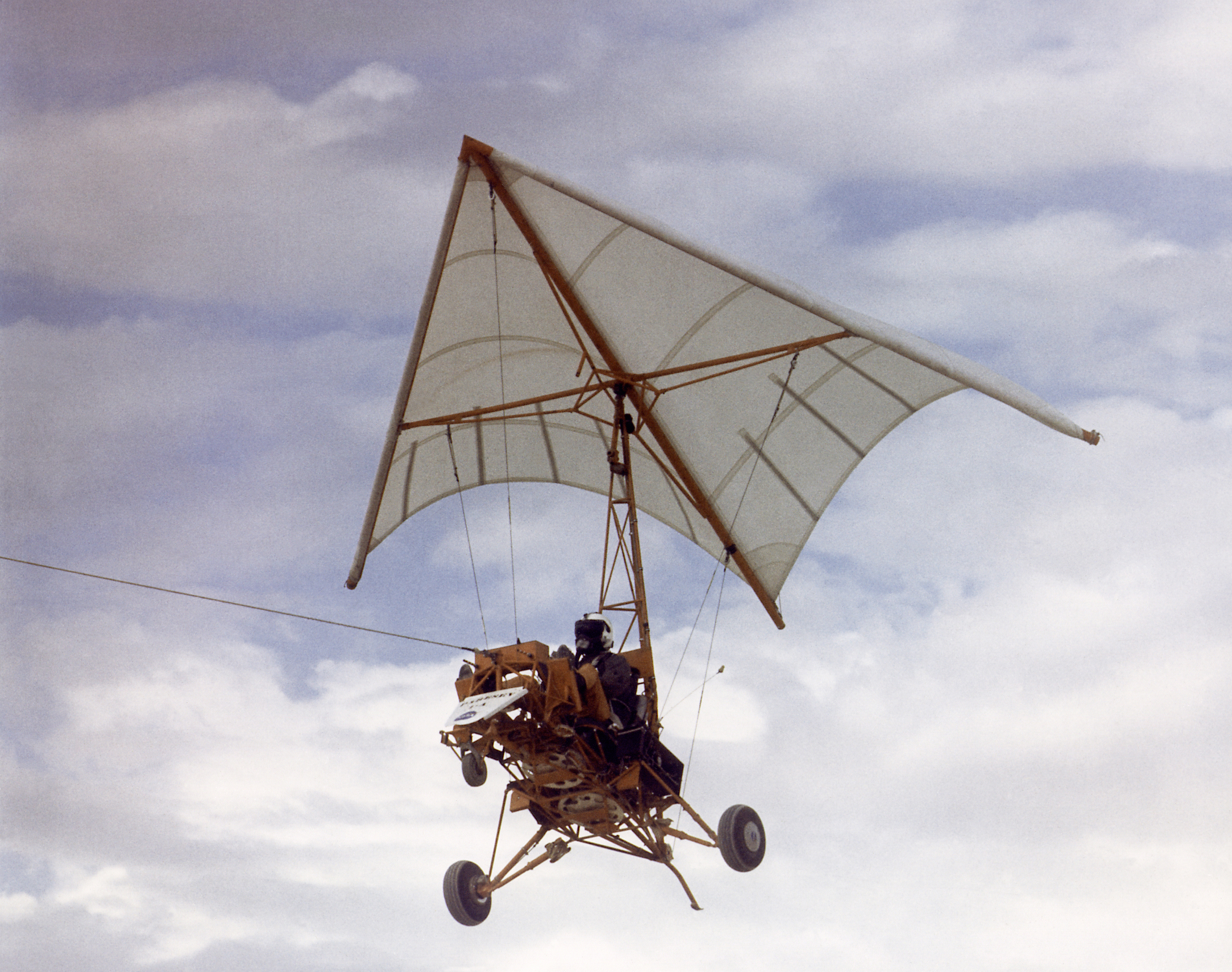
NASA's Paresev glider in flight with tow cable (1962).

In 1963, after seeing an image of a Rogallo wing airfoil on a magazine, Dickenson set to build a water skiing kite that could be released at altitude for a glide to a safe drop in the water, thus designed and built a water skiing kite wing he called the Ski Kite.

His ski kite format incorporated an airframe with a triangle control frame as used in hang gliding in Breslau 1908. Having a basebar tow-point and was integrated on an already publicized four-boom stiffened Rogallo wing airfoil, where the pilot sat on a swinging seat while the control frame and wire bracing distributed the load to the wing as well as giving a frame to brace for weight-shift control. Dickenson's Ski Wing turned out to be stable and controllable, unlike the flat manned kites used at water ski shows. The Ski Wing was first flown in public at the 'Grafton Jacaranda Festival', New South Wales, Australia, in September 1963 by Rod Fuller while towed behind a motorboat.

The ski kite he now called Ski Wing, was light and portable, so Dickenson decided to file for a mechanical patent, but lacking on economic resources, the patent process of formal review of claims could not be entered to determine which, if any, of the claims could hold, so the patent was not awarded.

== Hang gliders ==
=== Half scale prototype ===
Produced in 1963

=== Mark I ===
Produced on 8 September 1963. Features:

- Wing: biconical flexible wing
- Keel and leading edge length: 16 feet (5 m)
- Keel and leading edge: rigid
- Cross bar: rigid
- Control type: pendulum weight shift
- Pendulum attachment: single line
- Control bar: square frame
- Pilot support: seat
- Side wires: 8

Materials:

- Wing surface: banana bag plastic
- Leading edge and keel : 1 ½ inch wood, Oregon douglas fir
- Cross bar:"cross bar was a length of T.V. antenna, with a length of turned wood jammed into it to give it the required strength"
- Leading edge attachment:'D-section' wood and nails
- Cable: clothesline wire

=== Mark I with A-frame ===
Produced in September 1963.
Change: control A-frame added.
1963 October – Flown at the Jacaranda Festival in Grafton, New South Wales, Australia.
1963 Oct 11 – Provisional patent filed.

=== Mark II ===
Produced in January 1964.
Changes: All aluminium frame, leading edge and keel.
Length: 14 feet (4 m)

=== Mark III ===
Produced in March 1964.
Changes: Back to wooden leading edge and keel.
Leading edge and keel length <14 feet (4 m)

=== Mark IV ===
Produced in November 1964.
Changes: sewn sail.
Diagrams of this sent to Francis Rogallo at NASA.
In 1965, John leaves Grafton for Sydney.

=== Mark V ===
Produced between 1967 – 1968.
Changes: built by Aero Structures.
1969 April – Bill Moyes at NSW, Australia sets ridge soaring record at 32 minutes. Australia.

== Legacy ==
Certainly Rogallo and I provided the hardware.

— John W. Dickenson.

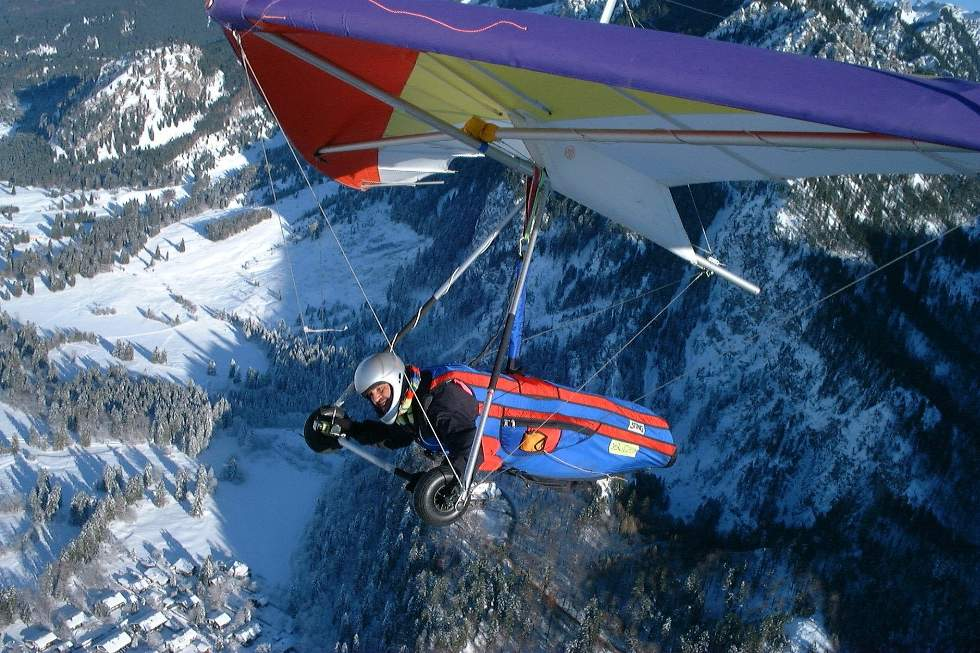
A basic hang glider flying over the Alps (2006)

Dickenson's hang glider format was further developed by other builders and directly helped to build the popularity of hang gliding around the world in the 1970s and 1980s.

It is certain that many people from many countries, made contributions to the development of the flexible wing hang glider to the extent that any global mechanical claim for invention would be untenable. In the aviation context of 'first flights' and recreational vs. commercial developments, new and old inventions often complement in synergy; it is in this evolutionary and social context that the crucial developments put together by John Dickenson, were the ones that were most successful and influential on the evolution of hang gliders. John Dickenson was a ski-kite pilot; he never foot-launched a hang glider.

== Awards ==
Most recognitions and awards have been given to Dickenson decades after his invention:

- 'Life Membership' to the Hang Gliding Federation of Australia (1993)
- 'Certificate of Recognition' by the British Hang Gliding & Paragliding Association (1993)
- Space Technology Hall of Fame (1995)
- Order of Australia (1996)
- Grafton Town Memorial, NSW Australia (2006)
- 'Certificate of Recognition' by the Hang Gliding Federation of Australia (2006)
- The Fédération Aéronautique Internationale Hang Gliding Diploma (2006) for the invention of the modern hang glider.
- The Fédération Aéronautique Internationale Gold Air Medal (2012).
- Oswald Watt Gold Medal (2012)
- "Flex-Wing Hang Glider Gold Air Award" by the World Hang Gliding Association (2013)

== See also ==
- History of hang gliding
