= Flight Dynamics Flightsail =

Flightsail

General information
- Type: Homebuilt aircraft
- National origin: United States of America
- Designer: Thomas H Purcell, Jr.

History
- First flight: 27 October 1961

The Purcell Flightsail or Flight Dynamics Flightsail is an experimental towed glider by Thomas H. Purcell, Jr. He sold plans in several publications for the tow-launched hung-mass controllable kite-glider. He flew first off water in late 1961 and then arranged things for off-land and landing on land. His efforts would find similarity echo later in early 1963 by the SkiPlane of Mike Burns.

== Development ==
The Flightsail is a single seat open cockpit parasol-winged glider with tricycle landing gear. The fuselage is constructed of a triangular pyramid-shaped or tetrahedral truss; the pilot was positioned in front of the triangle-control frame. The framed flexible wing resembles a hang-glider arrangement as used on the kited gliders of Paresev program and by Ryan Aeronautical Company. The glider used weight-shift pendulum control using a stick with cables that shifts the cg of the frame relative to the wing pivoting above it. The wing is constructed with a 50-degree sweep based on NASA technical note D-443 and covered with polyethylene sheet with rip-stop fiberglass tape in a one-foot mesh pattern. The aircraft was tested by NASA test pilots Milton Orville Thompson and Victor Horton to compare against the Rogallo wing being tested for space vehicle recovery. Purcell published that in an early 1962 flight session, Francis M. Rogallo also had a flight in the Flightsail; years later Purcell would have a very different aircraft using the flexible-wing in a modification which was flown by Francis M. Rogallo. Purcell's later Flight Dynamics Flightsail VII used the flexible-wing in a modified format.

== Specifications (Flightsail) ==
Data from Sport Aviation April 1962

General characteristics

- Crew: 1
- Wing area: 24 sq ft (2.2 m^{2})
- Empty weight: 75 lb (34 kg)
- Gross weight: 225 lb (102 kg)

Performance

== See also ==
North Carolina Museum of History Related development

- Flight Dynamics Flightsail VII

Aircraft of comparable role, configuration, and era

- Rogallo wing
