= Flight Dynamics Flightsail VII =

Flightsail VII

General information
- Type: Recreational amphibian
- Manufacturer: Flight Dynamics, Inc.
- Designer: Thomas H. Purcell, Jr.

History
- First flight: October 1970

The Flight Dynamics Flightsail VII was a recreational aircraft marketed in the United States in the 1970s for homebuilding by Flight Dynamics, Inc., most unusual both in its design and its method of construction. The Flightsail VII was intended to be built in three stages, with each stage representing a flyable aircraft of increasing complexity, capability, and cost. It was hoped that this approach would appeal to homebuilders by minimizing the amount of time and money required to take the aircraft to a point where it could be flown.

The core of the Flightsail VII was a pod-and-boom style fuselage, the pod component of which was in the form of a thick airfoil with integral pontoons at its bottom to aid stability in water. This fuselage could be fitted with flexible, hang-glider-like wings and be flown by having it towed aloft by a speedboat. It could either be left as such and operated in this form (known as a Seasprite) or serve as "Stage I" for the Flightsail VII.

In "Stage II", the builder would add a 90-125 hp powerplant to the aircraft, mounted in a nacelle set on struts above the fuselage pod while retaining the flexible wing. In "Stage III", the flexible wing would be replaced by a conventional, strut-braced monoplane wing mounted high on the fuselage.

== Distinguishing FlightSail, Mk I and II from the very different "Seasprite" FlightSail VII ==
Thomas H. Purcell, Jr., chief designer of a series of kite-gliders and other aircraft on October 27, 1961, had his maiden flight in a Rogallo wing four-boomed kite hang glider which he called FlightSail, Mk I, based on the Rogallo-Ryan Aeronautical wing in its known simple format. Differently, the "Seasprite" emphasized a large amphibious fuselage. Purcell did not patent the MK I or II, but sold plans around the world. He was granted an approved patent US3614032 regarding the staged-build "Seasprite" type along with variations.

== Specifications (Flightsail VII) ==
Data from Air Trails

General characteristics

- Crew: One pilot
- Capacity: 1 passenger
- Length: 25 ft 0 in (7.62 m)
- Wingspan: 39 ft 0 in (11.89 m)
- Height: 8 ft 10 in (2.68 m)
- Wing area: 195 sq ft (18.1 m^{2})
- Empty weight: 1,200 lb (544 kg)
- Gross weight: 1,700 lb (771 kg)
- Powerplant: 1 × Continental C90 , 90 hp (67 kW)

Performance

- Maximum speed: 95 mph (153 km/h, 83 kn)
- Range: 300 mi (482 km, 260 nmi)
- Service ceiling: 12,000 ft (3,660 m)
- Rate of climb: 500 ft/min (2.5 m/s)

== See also ==
- Plane&Pilot Description of the Flightsail VII

Related development

- Flight Dynamics Flightsail

Aircraft of comparable role, configuration, and era

- Skycraft Scout Flex wing aircraft
- Waco CG-4 Glider
- Rogallo wing
