= Barry Hill Palmer =

American aeronautical engineer

- Born: November 10, 1937 (age 88)
- Occupation: Aeronautical engineer
- Known for: Invention of the Rogallo wing hang glider and the ultralight trike aircraft.

Barry Hill Palmer (born November 10, 1937) is an American aeronautical engineer (UC Berkeley, 1961), inventor, builder and pilot of the first hang glider based on the Rogallo wing or flexible wing. Palmer also designed, built and flew the first weight-shift ultralight trike aircraft.

== Inventor of the first Flexible Wing hang glider ==
In August 1961, Barry Palmer first saw a photo of the Rogallo wing mounted on the Fleep experimental aircraft published in the Aviation Week magazine and became interested in this flexible wing because of its light weight and simplicity. In October 1961 he completed construction and flew the first flexible wing hang glider; this took place near Latrobe, east of Sacramento, California. He used polyethylene sheet, aluminum tubing and no wires for construction as he did fear kinking during assembly and transport. Most flights were performed with just a set of inclined parallel bars that split his weight between his underarms and hands to experiment with the center of gravity and thus he demonstrated that the Rogallo wing, when used as a hang glider, could also be controlled by shifting weight alone. Palmer, who built the first modern-age foot launched hang glider, is not yet mentioned by the FAI.

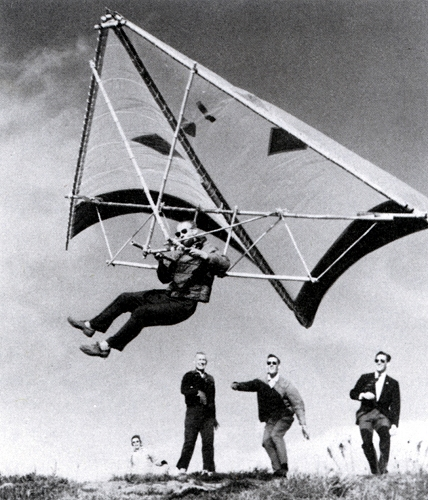
Richard Miller flying his new Bamboo Butterfly hang glider. Vista Del Mar California, 1966.

Palmer experimented with about 8 different hang glider versions and their wings were mostly 90 degree swept back wings. His smallest glider weighed 24 lb (11 kg), and had a surface area of 205 sq ft (19.0 m^{2}). The flexibility in the frame caused no performance problems. His first and largest hang glider was about 45 pounds and had a surface area of 342 sq ft (31.8 m^{2}). Palmer explored control of his several versions of hang gliders by using different control frames: pilot in front of the control frame, pilot behind the control frame, and control frame in front of the pilot in a swing seat, which inadvertently approximated the George A. Spratt mechanism from 1929. NASA’s Paresev glider came to light after Palmer’s gliding flights, so it bore no influence on him.

During the period from 1961 to 1963 Barry Palmer made tens of flights using the Rogallo wing concept. His flights were usually 110 metres (120 yards) long and his longest flight was about 180 metres (590 feet). He flew at altitudes up to 24 metres (79 feet). His best glider had an overall glide ratio of 4.5 to 1 at the speed of 29–32 km/h (18–20 miles/h). The last of Palmer’s hang gliders flew in the summer of 1963 and it had a single point suspension ski-lift type of seat mounted to the keel with a universal joint; the seat could be forced fore and aft, and laterally, but allowed for no twisting of the seat relative to the wing due to lateral stick movement. That is why a single control stick could be used to replace the control frame.

Palmer relates that he had a good paying aerospace job at the time and he was flying on a minimalist and inexpensive glider purely for curiosity and fun. He did not attempt to modernize or market the flexible wing hang glider; there was no attempt to publicize on the media, except for an 'accidental' report made by a small local newspaper. In fact, Palmer concealed his efforts to the American aviation bureaucracy (FAA) of flying without credentials in a pre-ultralight era, but freely gave information about the wing to any person interested, including Francis Rogallo and Richard Miller, who develop the famous Bamboo Butterfly Rogallo wing hang glider, the plans of which circulated in some American magazines in the mid 1960s; Tara Kiceniuk's followed with plans for the bamboo Batso Rogallo wing.

== Inventor of the ultralight trike aircraft ==
In March 1967, Palmer built and flew the first true weight-shift powered ultralight trike aircraft: the Paraplane (FAA Registered N7144) and it was controlled by a single vertical control bar. The Paraplane used two West Bend-Chrysler 820 engines (8 hp at 6000 rpm, reduced to 4700 rpm for about 6.5 hp (4.8 kW) each, for a total of 13 hp). Each engine had a direct drive to a 27in diameter two-blade propeller made of polyester & fiberglass. On March 24, 1967 Palmer registered the trike at the American FAA as the Palmer Parawing D-6, serial 1A, N7144; No restrictions were noted.

The second Palmer trike, the Skyhook (FAA registered N4411) in spite of its early date of origin, had most of the attributes of a modern ultralight trike, except it used a single cylinder snowmobile engine, as the two-stroke twin cylinders were not available yet. It was powered by a 17 hp (13 kW) at 5000 rpm single cylinder JLO L297 two stroke engine, driving a composite propeller designed and built by Palmer himself and driven by a 2.1/1 reduction gearbox. The engine had electric start and the craft had fiberglass composite spring landing gear. The airframe consisted of bolted 6061-T6 aluminum tube, with 6061 T-6 extruded angle. The craft took off, flew, and landed at about 30 mph (48 km/h). Palmer’s trikes were not developed further and remained in obscurity. Rolland Magallon from France is sometimes thought to have invented the ultralight trike aircraft because it was Magallon who first marketed it from October 1979 through 1981.

Palmer moved on to design a successful line of personal hovercraft.

== See also ==
- History of hang gliding
- History of ultralight trikes
- Ryan XV-8
- Parasev
