= Ryan XV-8 =

American experimental STOL aircraft

XV-8 "Fleep"
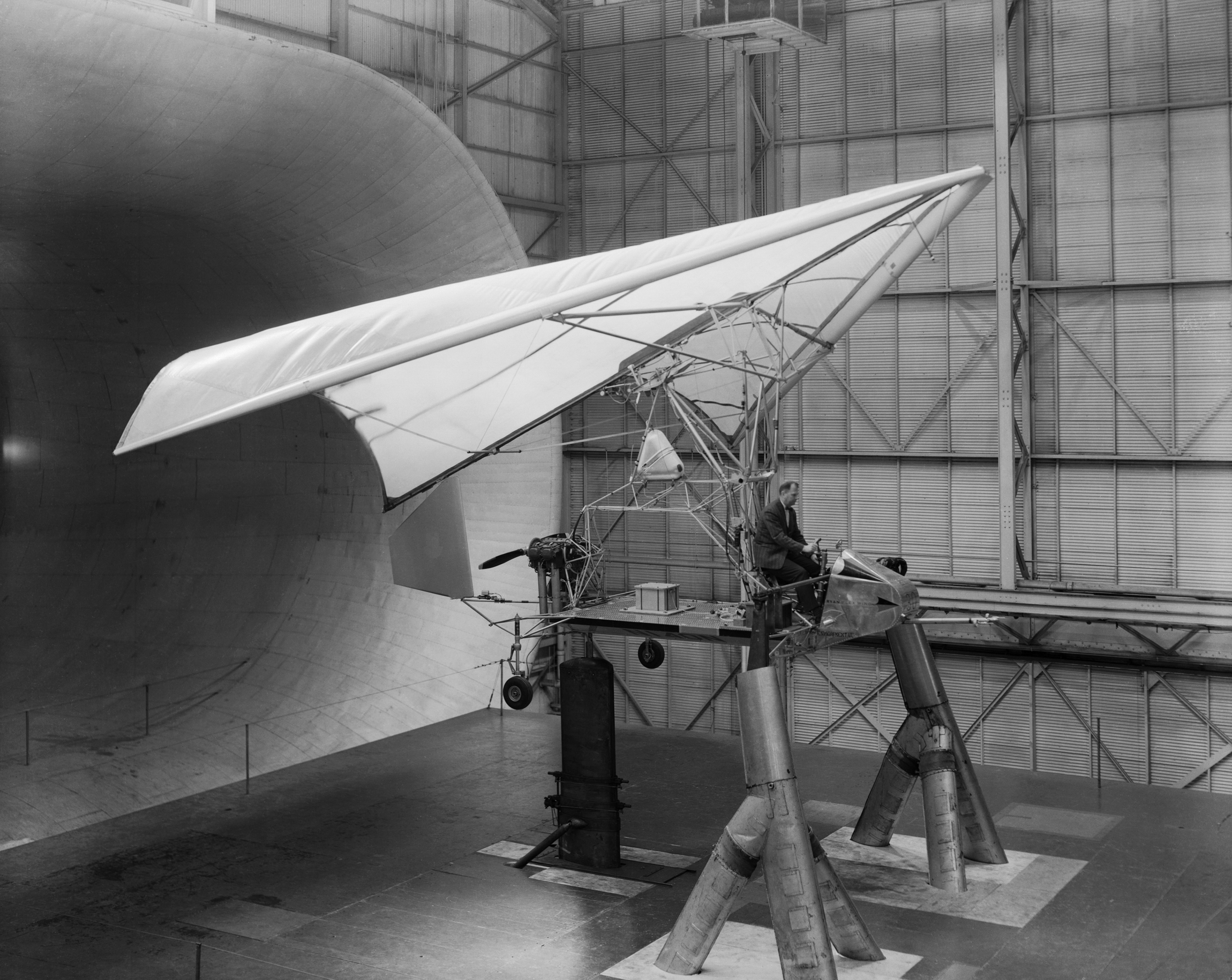
- XV-8 "Fleep" tested in the Full Scale Tunnel at Langley, 1962

General information
- Type: Experimental STOL aerial utility vehicle
- Manufacturer: Ryan Aeronautical Company
- Number built: 1

History
- First flight: 1961

The Ryan XV-8 Flexible Wing Aerial Utility Vehicle (nicknamed Fleep, short for "Flying Jeep") was an improved version of the Flex-Wing. Both aircraft were built by Ryan Aeronautical Company in collaboration with NASA for the United States Air Force and the United States Army and tested in 1961 as a STOL patrol, reconnaissance, and light utility aircraft to transport people or freight when a more specialized aircraft is not required or available.

== Design and development ==
The Fleep began as the Flex-Wing. The Flex-Wing had four-wheel landing gear, a smaller nose section behind which the pilot sat, and a single vertical tail/rudder.

The Fleep had tricycle landing gear, a larger nose section and a V tail/rudder. The wing was a fabric delta-shaped Rogallo wing with a foldable frame; the wing was attached to a pod-like cockpit on a four-wheeled cargo platform. It was tested with two tail configurations — vertical fin and V-tail. The aircraft wing could be folded into a relatively small package for transport.

== Specifications ==
General characteristics

- Crew: One pilot
- Length: 10 ft 6 in (5.94 m)
- Wingspan: 33 ft 5 in (10.18 m)
- Powerplant: 1 × Continental IO-360-A , 210 hp (157 kW)

Performance

- Maximum speed: 65 mph (105 km/h, 56 kn)
- Range: 120 mi (193 km, 100 nmi)

== See also ==
- Francis Rogallo's airfoil
- John W. Dickenson
- History of hang gliding
- Ultralight trike aircraft

Aircraft of comparable role, configuration, and era

- NASA Paresev
