= Australian Aviation Museum =

Closed museum in Australia

Coordinates: 33.926485°S 150.981049°E

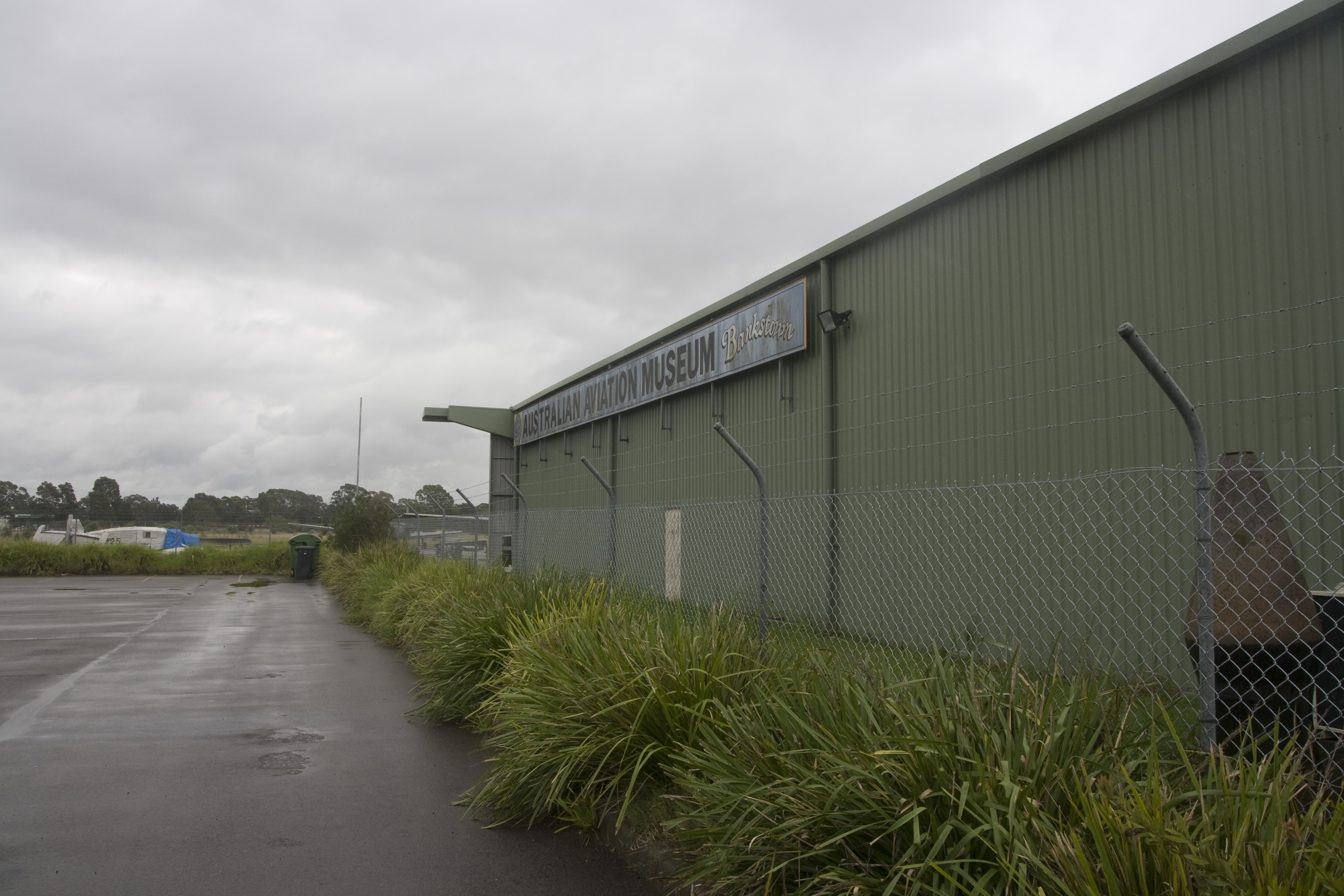
Australian Aviation Museum in 2012

The Australian Aviation Museum was located on Starkie Drive, Bankstown Airport in the suburb of Bankstown.

== History ==
The museum was opened by the then Prime Minister the Hon. Paul Keating in 1994, and showcases the history and future of aviation, space technology and the progress in world aviation. The museum is now closed permanently.

== Collection ==
The Australian Aviation Museum has on display a mock up Boeing 747-400 which is used as a movie set. It has been used in films such as Mission: Impossible 2, the Lost, Foxtel's the Pam Ann Show and many other productions. The movie Set has a detailed cockpit with galleys, first, business and economy class Seats.

The museum also has a collection of historic uniforms and flying apparel.

Historic aircraft in the museum's collection include:

- Beechcraft Model 35 V Tail Bonanza
- Clancy Skybaby
- Corby Starlet
- Dassault Mirage III
- Douglas DC-3
- Fawcett 120 (unique, and manufactured at Bankstown)
- Feast Circle CW Aircraft
- Harley Newman Gyrocopter AUSTRALIA II which has never flown.
- Link Trainer
- Luton L.A.5 Major
- Mayfly 3 Pedal Powered Aircraft
- Mikoyan-Gurevich MIG-15 UTI
- Hawker Siddeley HS 748
- de Havilland Dove (Sea Devon C Mk.20)
- de Havilland Drover
- de Havilland Heron
- Royal Aircraft Factory S.E.5a Replica
- Scottish Aviation Twin Pioneer
- Short C Class Empire Model
- Transavia PL-12 Airtruk
- Volmer VJ-22 Sportsman
- Wheeler Tweetie Hang Glider
- Wheeler Skycraft Scout

== See also ==
- List of aerospace museums
