= Platz glider =

German single-seat glider, 1923

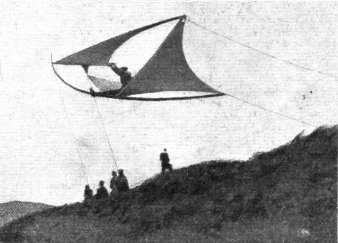

General information
- Type: foldaway glider
- National origin: Germany
- Designer: Reinhold Platz

History
- First flight: February 1923

The Platz glider was a very simple, though unusual, collapsible canard glider designed and tested in Germany in the early 1920s. The Platz glider predated the well known Rogallo designs by over two decades. But in the same decade of the 1920s was a device that had also a high second deck: the Argabrite man-carrying device that featured a triangle undercarriage with wheels on the basebar.

The Platz glider was intended to provide a cheap, easily transported, and simple to fly introduction to the increasingly popular sport.

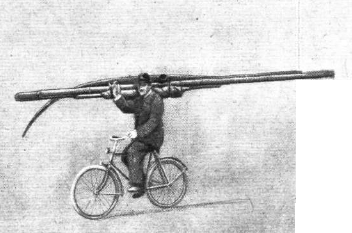
Platz glider being transported

== Design and development ==
In Germany, just after the end of World War I, the 1919 Versailles treaty imposed a ban on powered flight. As a result, there was a rapid increase of interest in gliding. Reinhold Platz, the chief designer for Fokker's after June 1916, perceived a role for a glider that was cheap to buy, costing less than "one good pedal cycle", and cheap to maintain, while being robust and capable of being transported, by train or otherwise, and rapidly erected by one man.

Platz recalled sailing a sloop rigged boat, which had been very stable upwind and capable of maintaining its course without rudder input. He reasoned that the same stability he saw in that boat might be achieved by a similarly rigged glider with a small forewing and a larger rear plane. Just as the sloop could be controlled by adjusting its jib, the glider could be controlled by foreplane trimming. After some preliminary experiments with simple paper models, Platz designed the one-man canard glider which was then named after him.

The Platz glider was built around a central, two part boom. A curved, circular cross-section steel tube reached from the nose at least as far aft as the welded sockets which received the ends of the main wing spars. A solid, circular section wood beam was inserted into this steel tube, extending it rearwards. The wing spars were also circular, solid and wooden, set with strong dihedral which took their tips to the height of the extreme nose so that the foreplanes, elevators or jibs could be attached between these three points. Their inner trailing edges were directly controlled by the pilot, who sat over the central beam-wing spar joint. They were initially hinged together at their leading edges, but later the hinge point was moved rearwards towards the aerodynamic centre to reduce pilot load and separated only behind the hinge. Since there were no ribs, the airfoil was determined by the airflow and the pilot, as for the sloop's jib. The main wing, a single surface stretched between the spars and the extreme tail, also had its camber determined by the airflow, like the mainsail of the sloop. Both wing sheets were produced by sewing together narrow strips of material; the longitudinal joints between them are prominent in some back lit, better quality images.

The Platz could be disassembled into a 3,300 mm (130 in) × 350 mm (14 in) × 250 mm (10 in) pack, weighing 40 kg (88 lb) in fifteen minutes and reassembled in ten. Transport by bicycle, with care, was possible.

Free flight trials began without pilots and with increasing loads (up to 75 kg (165 lb)) into strengthening wind and eventually over sandhills as high as 25 m (82 ft). With a pilot in place, the glider was then flown tethered like a kite. Several people, with weights up to 100 kg (220 lb) flew it this way, all reporting that forewing control loads were low. In February 1923 it was free flown in a moderate wind over 10 m (33 ft) dunes. Platz decided that the dunes did not provide usable soaring, their next goal, after which the experiments would end. He noted that, whilst his design could not compete with the best conventional gliders, it had met the initial targets outlined above and thought it or something similar would be of great value, seemingly content to leave others to judge his design.

== Specifications ==
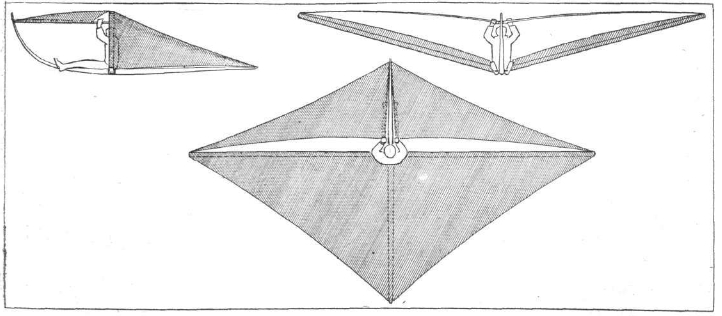
General layout of the Platz glider; not a scaled or detailed drawing

Data from Flight, 6 March 1924, p.130

General characteristics

- Crew: One
- Wingspan: 6.60 m (21 ft 8 in)
- Wing area: 16.0 m^{2} (172 sq ft)
- Empty weight: 40 kg (88 lb)
