= Jan Lavezzari =

French painter (1876-1947)

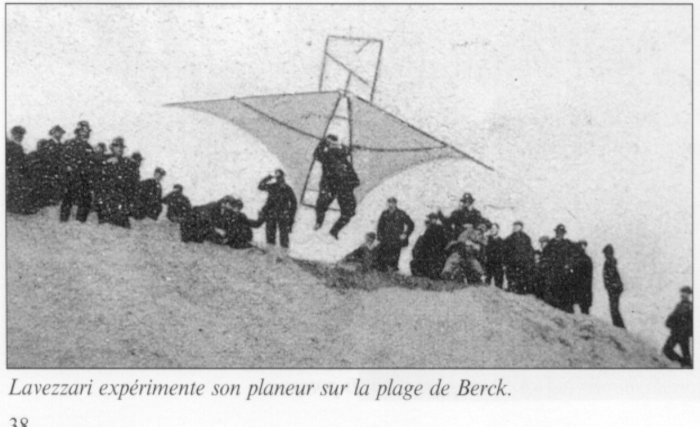
Jan Lavezzari testing his double sail glider. Berck-sur-Mer, France. Feb./15/1904.

Jan Lavezzari (January 3, 1876 – May 11, 1947) was a gifted painter, born in Paris, France from a well known architect: Emile Lavezzari. Jan studied engineering and then moved to Berck-sur-Mer, northern France in 1900, where he decided to become a professional painter instead, and settled there. Jan Lavezzari produced several oil paintings that are seemingly valuable today. He also painted murals in a few local public buildings such as 'Le Casino de la Forêt' in Touquet-Paris-Plage, the local hospital 'L'Hôpital Maritime' -built by his father- and the town hall.

Biographers record that Jan Lavezzari liked the outdoor, adventure, and that he preferred the company of fishermen, who often took him out to sea. Jan Lavezzari is best known for his paintings, which generally portray sailboats. His engineering education in this maritime environment probably prompted him to realize that if a sail is placed horizontally, it could become a flying wing, so on February 15, 1904, at the age of 27 years, he tested a double lateen sail hang glider from the Berck beach sand dunes.
