= Gertrude Rogallo =

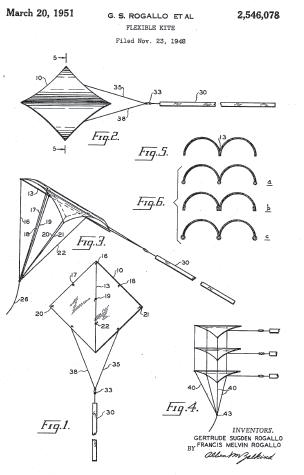
Gertrude and Francis Rogallo's original patented flexible wing

Gertrude S. Rogallo (January 13, 1914 – January 28, 2008) was one of the co-inventors of the flexible wing. These wings are now known as Rogallo wings. She and her husband, Francis Rogallo, invented the wing and obtained two United States patents on different versions of it in the early 1950s. Rogallo wings are commonly used today in kites, hang gliders and powered hang gliders.

== Patents ==
- Rogallo, Gertrude et al., “Flexible Kite”, US patent 2,546,078, Filed November 23, 1948
- Rogallo, Gertrude et al., “Flexible Kite”, US patent 2,751,172, Filed November 17, 1952
