= Taras Kiceniuk Jr. =

American hang glider pioneer (born 1954)

Taras Kiceniuk Jr. (born c. May 14, 1954) is a hang glider pioneer from Southern California.

Kiceniuk began building hang gliders in 1971 while still in high school. At first he flew his gliders near Palomar Mountain where his father was curator of Palomar Observatory but later began flying at Torrey Pines Gliderport in La Jolla. He soon moved from the traditional Rogallo wing design to a rigid flying wing biplane design he called Icarus. Icarus I is now at the Smithsonian Institution awaiting restoration and display. Kiceniuk set several endurance records with Icarus II. Icarus III and Icarus IV were abandoned in the design phase in favor of a monoplane configuration for Icarus V. Icarus V was a precursor to the modern rigid wing hang glider. In 2005 Icarus V was one of eight ultralight aircraft displayed at the Experimental Aircraft Association's Tribute to Ultralight Pioneers exhibit at their AirVenture Museum in Oshkosh, Wisconsin.

Kiceniuk was also a contender for the first Kremer Prize for human-powered flight. He later worked with Dr. Paul MacCready on MacCready's Gossamer Albatross.

== Kiceniuk Icarus I ==
The Kiceniuk Icarus I was a hang glider designed, built and flown by Kiceniuk in the early 1970s.

At a time when most hang gliders used a flexible Rogallo wing, Icarus I used a rigid flying wing biplane configuration. Unlike other hang gliders of the time, the Icarus was not steered by the pilot shifting his body weight. Instead, Icarus I had two large rudders mounted near the wing tips, controlled by hand levers. These rudders made Icarus I much more maneuverable than other hang gliders. Pitch was controlled by the pilot shifting his body weight fore and aft. The pilot flew in upright position, supporting himself by his arms on fore-aft rails.

Icarus I is now at the Smithsonian Institution awaiting restoration and display.

=== Specifications ===
- Crew: one, pilot
- Passengers: none
- Length: 5.94 m (19 ft 6 in) (see talk page)
- Wingspan: 9.17 m (30 ft 1 in)
- Height: 1 m (3 ft 3 in)
- Empty: 24.5 kg (54 lb)

== Kiceniuk Icarus II ==
The Kiceniuk Icarus II was the second in a series of hang gliders designed by Kiceniuk.

Like Kiceniuk Icarus I, Icarus II was a rigid biplane flying wing. Its most notable improvement over Icarus I was that the wings were swept back more steeply. It was steered by hand controlled rudders, unlike Rogallo wing hang gliders of the time that were steered by the pilot shifting their body weight. The Federal Aviation Administration recognized Icarus II as an ultra-light aircraft and issued Kiceniuk with the registration N55TK number for it.

Kiceniuk set several endurance records with Icarus II and many copies were built from plans he sold.

=== Specifications ===
PERFORMANCE

- Speed range: 18 - 45 mph
- Take-off airspeed: 20
- Landing airspeed approach: 20-25
- Landing airspeed, flare out: 4-6
- Stall speed: 18
- Best glide speed: 20
- Minimum sink speed: 19
- Sink rate minimum: 210 ft/min
- Glide ratio maximum: 8.5
- Glide ratio minimum: 1.0
- Bank angle: 60°

DIMENSIONS

- Wing span (trailing edge): 29.0 feet
- Wing area: 193.33 ft²
- Aspect ratio: 8.7
- Wing loading: 1.32 lb/ft² (w 200 lb pilot)
- Chord: 40 inches
- Configuration: biplane
- airfoil: S shaped camber line
- Sweep: 15.42°
- Washout: 4.5° (between top and bottom planes)
- Weight: 55 lb
- Pilot weight max lb: 200
- Design "G" load: 4
- Ultimate "G" load: 6

== Kiceniuk Icarus V ==
The Kiceniuk Icarus V was the fifth designed and third built in a series of hang gliders designed by Kiceniuk.

Kiceniuk's Icarus I and Icarus II were revolutionary hang gliders. These were rigid biplane flying wings, with hand-controlled rudders, in which the pilot flew in a reclining position. This was at a time when most hang gliders were Rogallo wings that the pilot steered solely by shifting his body weight. Kiceniuk abandoned the designs for Icarus III and Icarus IV in favor of a monoplane configuration for Icarus V.

Icarus V was a swept wing, constant-chord, flying wing monoplane with a 32-foot (9.8 m) span. Construction was of cable-braced aluminum tubing covered with fabric. The leading edge had foam sheet formed over aluminum ribs. It had an efficient high-lift airfoil giving it a glide ratio of 10:1, which was remarkable for a hang glider (Rogallo wings were hardly more than steerable parachutes with glide ratios of around 3:1). Icarus V had hanging winglet rudders and was flown in a reclining position.

Many Icarus Vs were built from plans sold by Kiceniuk and it was also commercially produced by Free-Flight Systems, Inc. of Sylmar, California. The Icarus series, especially Icarus V, were instrumental in the development of the modern 'rigid wing' hang glider. Although its performance was astounding, the foldable, portable Rogallo flexible wings retained their popularity because the Rogallo wing dramatically reduced difficulty in storage, transport, assembly and repair. In addition, the flexible wing could always be redesigned to improve the performance far more easily than a rigid wing could be designed for portability. Hang gliders eventually evolved to a slender efficient wing like that of the Icarus V while retaining the portability of the Rogallo wing.

Kiceniuk's Icarus V from 1973 is one of eight ultralight aircraft displayed at the Experimental Aircraft Association's Tribute to Ultralight Pioneers exhibit at their AirVenture Museum in Oshkosh, Wisconsin.

=== Specifications ===
- Crew: one, pilot
- Passengers: none
- Length:
- Wingspan: 32 ft (9.8 m)
- Chord: 5 ft (1.5 m)
- Wing area: 160 sq ft (15 m^{2})
- Height:
- Empty: 65 lb (29 kg)
- Stall speed: 16 mph (26 km/h)
- Maximum speed: Over 40 mph (64 km/h)

== Patents ==
- US design patent D0576541
- Articulated cane
