= Skycraft Scout =

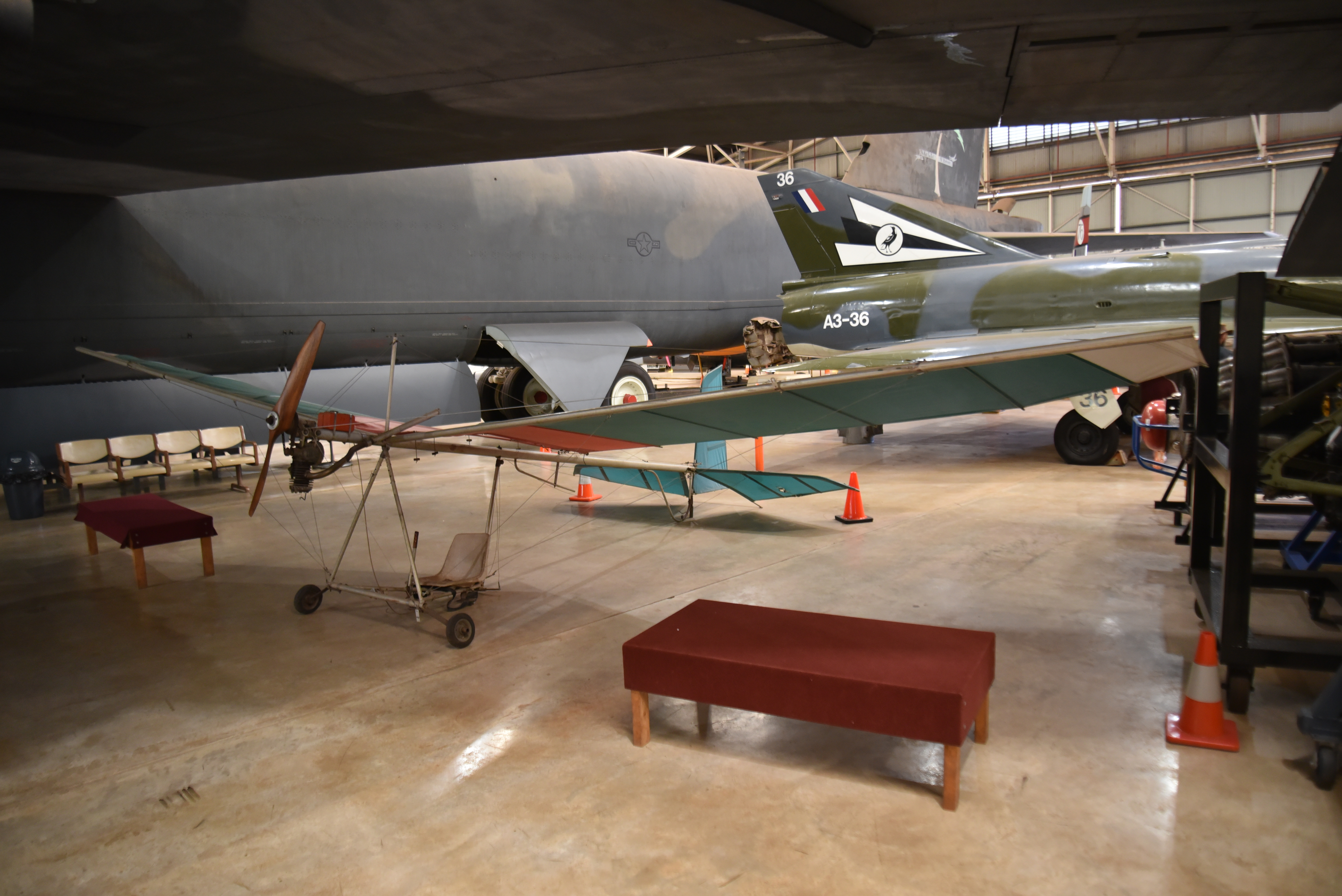
- A Skycraft Scout at the Darwin Aviation Museum

General information
- Type: Single seat ultralight aircraft
- Manufacturer: Skycraft Pty Ltd
- Designer: Ron Wheeler
- Primary user: recreational flying
- Number built: 200 approx

History
- Manufactured: 1976–1978
- First flight: 1972
- Developed from: Tweetie hang glider

The Skycraft Scout is an Australian designed and built single-seat, tail dragger, microlight airplane, used primarily for recreational aviation.

== Design and development ==
In July 1972 a Sydney boat builder named Ronald Gilbert Wheeler made the first flight of a minimum aircraft which he'd designed and built himself, and which he put into series production soon thereafter. At the time Ron was building catamarans in Sydney's southern suburbs. Having already developed 'Tweetie', a successful hang glider, Wheeler simply modified the design of the glider to have the pilot seated instead of hanging below the wings, and of course to accommodate an engine.

Marketed as the Skycraft Scout, this was the world's first commercially produced ultra light – rigid wing rather than a Rogallo – and spawned a new Australian industry.

Ron had no experience in aircraft design and claims to have started the project on a whim in his spare time. Using sources referenced from the library at Sydney Technical College and Hurstville local Library he built up a working knowledge of aerodynamics. In his 1975 patent application (number 494013) Wheeler claims to have "improve[ed]the flight characteristics of the rogallo wing by so cutting and sewing the fabric as to shape the wing to form an aerofoil section having an increasing angle of attack from the root to the tip of the wing as well as increasing the area of the wing at the outer span region relative to that of a conventional rogallo configuration."

The Scout was a factory-built minimum aircraft that utilised yacht fittings from his local marine shop. The early Scout was an extremely basic machine, which utilised Dacron sailcloth for the wing covering, lanyards and battens and an aluminium yacht mast as the wing spar. It was initially powered by a modified Victa lawnmower engine and, unlike a conventional aeroplane, had only rudder and elevator controls. Nevertheless, on a good day, it usually flew.

Significantly, the Scout was the first ultralight aircraft to be covered by airworthiness regulations in the world, in this case-Australia's Air Navigation Order(ANO)95.10 issued by the Department of Transport. In 1975 Ron Wheeler approached The Department of Transport to issue an Air Navigation Order regulation for ultralight and minimum aircraft. Subsequently, the Department issued ANO 95.10 for unlicensed pilots to fly aircraft weighing less than 180 kilograms under a number of restrictive conditions, including altitude restrictions, and not to fly over sealed roads. This allowed the ultralight aircraft industry to take-off, and Wheeler went into full-time production of the Scout as a leisure craft.

== Specifications ==
General characteristics

- Crew: one pilot
- Wingspan: 7.4 m (24 ft 3 in)
- Height: 1.9 m (6 ft 3 in)
- Empty weight: 49.4 kg (109 lb)
- Powerplant: 1 × Pixie 153 c.c. 2-stroke, single cylinder , 9.0 kW (12 hp)

Performance

- Maximum speed: 78 km/h (42 mph, 36 kn)
- Maximum glide ratio: 7:1
- Power/mass: 2

== See also ==
- Recreational Aviation Australia
