= Charles Richards (NASA engineer) =

Charles Richard
- Engineering career
- Discipline: Design Engineer
- Institutions: NASA Flight Research Center
- Employer: NASA
- Projects: NASA Paresev glider
- Significant design: Collapsible four-tube Rogallo wing
- Significant advance: Wing configuration widely copied in hang gliders, expanded kiting, hang gliding, ultralight, and trike flight
- Awards: Included in the space Stardust (spacecraft) chip (2004)

Charles Richard was a design engineer, who designed the collapsible four-tube Rogallo wing used in the experimental NASA Paresev glider. The wing configuration he created was used for manned hung-pilot kite-gliders and was to be found copied only with slight ornamental variation in a decade of hang gliders. Richards was of the Flight Research Center's Vehicle and System Dynamics Branch. The four-beamed wing folded from the nose plate; one of the beams was the spreader beam that kept the flexible-wing's sweep. Those in the following decade copying the Charles Richard wing configuration expanded kiting, hang gliding, ultralight, and trike flight.

== Timeline ==
- 1961 December : Charles Richard is given a directive from NASA's Paul Bikle to build quickly a cheap kite glider that could be used to give pilots practice in flying in free flight using simple weight-shifting that would change the attitude of the wing relative to the hung position of the pilot and payload.
- 1962 February 12 : Charles Richard and his team completed a first kite-glider that achieved obtaining an FAA registration. Many versions followed first flight tests.
- 2004 Charles Richard name was included in the space Stardust (spacecraft) chip.
