= George A. Spratt =

American inventor and aviation pioneer (1870–1934)

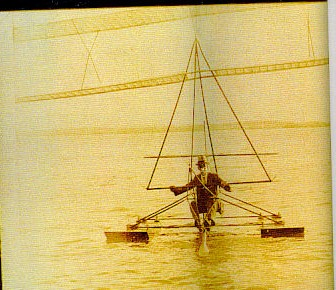
Spratt towed his hang glider on floats using a motorboat demonstrating cable-stayed triangle control frame (TCF) or A-frame for use in pilot-pendulumed weight-shift control of hang gliders, trikes, and ultralights. United States, 1929.

George Alexander Spratt (November 1, 1870 – November 24, 1934) was an American inventor and pioneer in aviation design. In collaboration with the Wright brothers, Spratt demonstrated the cable-stayed triangle control frame for use in mass-shifting the pilot and pilot holding to control the attitude of a lifting wing for any type of aircraft that could benefit from such arrangement. This arrangement ended up being the sub-assembly most used in hang gliders, powered hang gliders, trikes, and ultralights.

== Life and career ==
Spratt was born in New Jersey on November 1, 1870, the son of physician George Reed Spratt. Around 1880, the family moved to Coatesville, Pennsylvania, where the elder Spratt established a successful medical practice. The younger Spratt studied medicine, attending Bucknell University and Medico-Chirurgical College, but may never have qualified as a physician. Illness forced him to give up his career plans in 1894 and move to the family farm four miles northeast of Coatesville, where he settled into farming.

Starting in 1896, Spratt became a lifelong amateur scientist absorbed in the study of aeronautics. He corresponded with aviation pioneer Octave Chanute and spent three weeks at Kitty Hawk, North Carolina, in the summer of 1901 assisting the Wright brothers in their aeronautical experiments. His recommendation to reduce the curvature of the glider's wings led to much more stable flight. He spent the entirety of October 1902 and October 1903 at Kitty Hawk, shortly before Orville Wright flew the first controlled powered airplane. Spratt continued to experiment and construct gliders, with mixed success, in an attempt to produce airplanes that remained perfectly stable in the air without intervention by the pilot. In 1920, he finally received a patent for his wing of circular cross section and tested an airplane using the wing at Pine Valley, New Jersey, in 1924. By then he was no longer on speaking terms with the Wrights, who he claimed had deprived him of due credit for their inventions. His experiments culminated on September 28, 1934, when his son, George G. Spratt, flew a "plane without a tail" for the first time.

Spratt died of heart disease two months later on November 24, 1934, in Coatesville. As of 1981, his son was living in Wallingford, Connecticut, and continuing to build planes using his father's designs.

== Legacy ==
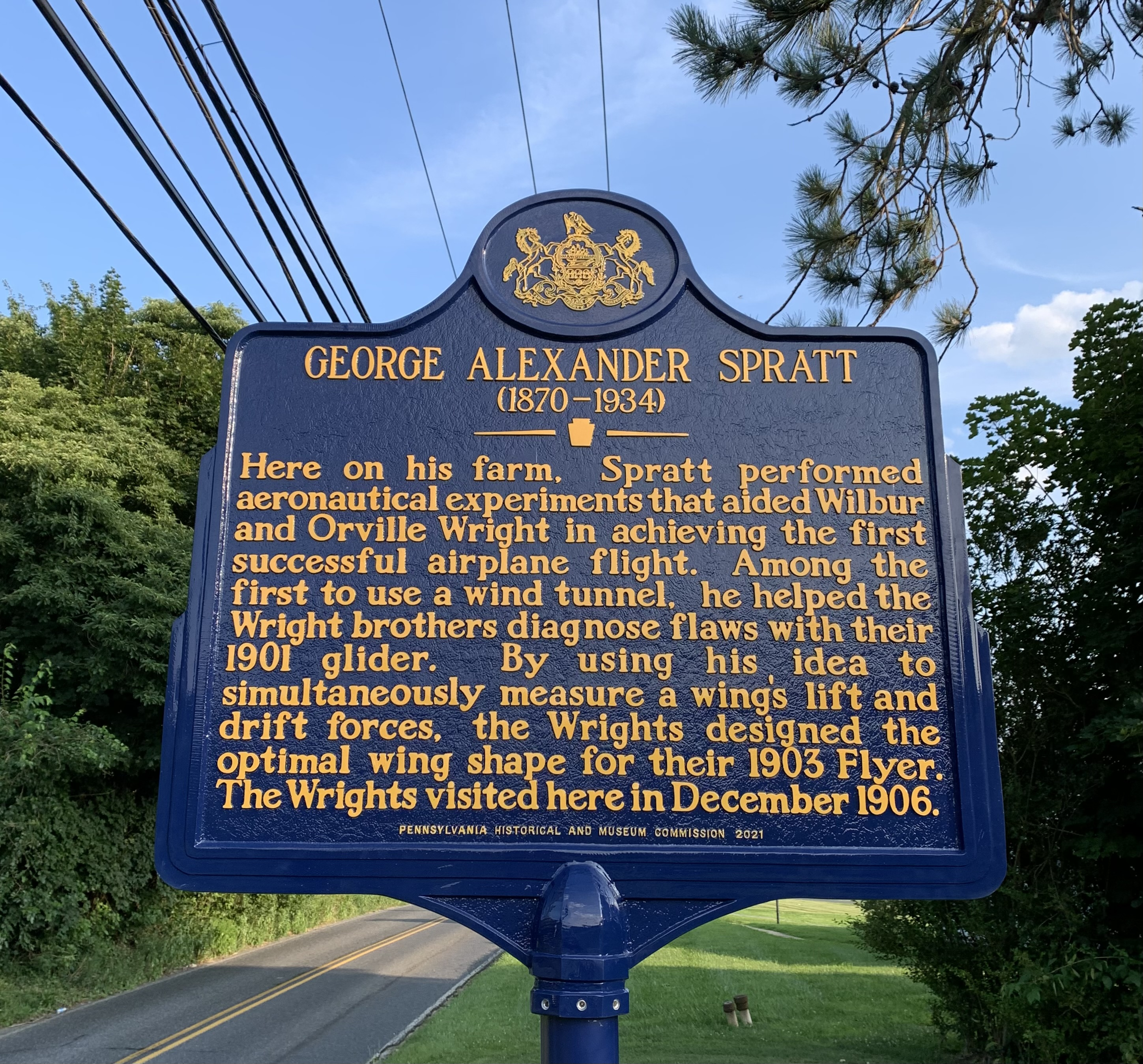
Pennsylvania state historical marker erected in 2021

The Pennsylvania Historical and Museum Commission dedicated a state historical marker to Spratt on October 16, 2021. Located by the road outside the Spratt Farm in West Brandywine Township, Chester County, Pennsylvania, the marker states that his "research was instrumental in the Wright brothers’ first flight. He performed countless experiments to understand the forces that would keep aircraft aloft. His innovative use of a wind tunnel led to greater understanding of the effect of lift, drag, and the center of pressure on a curved wing.”
