= Francis Rogallo =

American aeronautical engineer

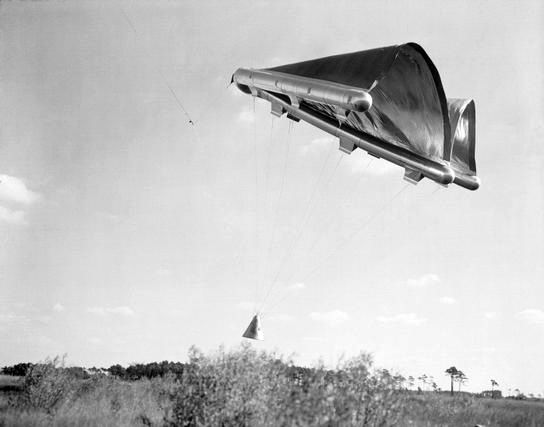
Self-inflating Rogallo's flexible wing (parawing).

Francis Melvin Rogallo (January 27, 1912 – September 1, 2009) was an American aeronautical engineer inventor born in Sanger, California, U.S. Together with his wife, he is credited with the invention of the Rogallo wing, or "flexible wing", a precursor to the modern hang glider and paraglider. His patents were ranged over mechanical utility patents and ornamental design patents for wing controls, airfoils, target kite, flexible wing, and advanced configurations for flexible wing vehicles.

== Career ==
Francis Rogallo earned an aeronautical engineering degree at Stanford University in 1935. Since 1936, Rogallo worked for the National Advisory Committee for Aeronautics (NACA) as an aeronautics project engineer at the wind tunnels. During 1948, he and his wife, Gertrude Rogallo, invented and patented a self-inflating flexible kite. They called this kite the "flexible wing". Rogallo had originally invented the wing with the idea to create an aircraft which would be simple enough and inexpensive enough that anyone could have one. The wing was flown by Rogallo as a model glider with small payloads hung beneath the wing (thus model hang glider) and as a kite.

The Rogallo wing is one of the simplest airfoils ever created. A wing using the airfoil could be used to carry payloads, undercarriage devices, pilot-control assemblies, etc. For the next six years, the Rogallos tried ceaselessly to attract both government and industry interest in their flexible wing, and they licensed a manufacturer in Connecticut to sell a kite based on it. When the DuPont company announced the development of Mylar in 1952, Rogallo immediately saw how superior it would be for his kite, and the five-dollar toy "Flexikite" became one of the first products to use the plastic material. The Rogallos found themselves traveling to kiting events around the Northeast to fly and promote the toy, with moderate success.

On October 4, 1957, the Russian Sputnik began beeping its message from orbit, and everything changed. The space race caught the imagination of the newly formed NASA and Rogallo was in position to seize the opportunity. The Rogallos released their patent to the government, and with Rogallo's help at the wind tunnels, NASA began a series of experiments testing the Parawing (NASA renamed the Rogallo wing the Parawing, and modern hang glider pilots often refer to it as the flexible Rogallo wing) at altitudes up to 200,000 feet and as fast as Mach 3 in order to evaluate them as alternative recovery system for the Gemini space capsules and used rocket stages. By 1960, NASA had made test flights of a framed Parawing powered aircraft, called the "flying Jeep" or Fleep, and of a weight shift Parawing glider, called Paresev, in a series of several shapes and sizes, manned and unmanned. A key wing configuration applying Francis Rogallo's leadership that gave base to kited gliders with hung pilots using weight-shift control was designed by Charles Richards and constructed by the Richards team in 1961–2; such wing became a template for recreational use or Rogallo's inventions, ending up mechanically and ornamentally in Skiplane, ski-kites, and hang gliders of the 1960–1975.

In 1967, projects focused on the Parasev were stopped by NASA in favor of round parachutes. NASA was not in the business of applying Rogallo's family of airfoils to personal aircraft such as kites, hang gliders, and powered light aircraft; however what was already in the Paresev series of aircraft provided all the fundamental mechanics that could be simplified to lighter personal aircraft. That task of lightening and tweaking what the Paresev team had done with the Rogallo wing was taken up by independent designers around the world: Barry Palmer in 1961, Richard Miller, Thomas Purcell, and Australian Mike Burns were among the first to tap the technology for manned personal-craft glider/kite use.

As of 2003, Rogallo had new designs for kites.

Tens of thousands of people have taken hang gliding lessons in Rogallo wing type hang gliders at Jockey's Ridge State Park, an enormous sand dune which is located five miles from the site of the first powered aircraft flight. Mr. Rogallo was frequently seen at the park flying his own hang glider in the 1970s and 1980s.

Francis Rogallo died at home on September 1, 2009, in Southern Shores, North Carolina, near Kitty Hawk, the birthplace of aviation. Gertrude died on January 28, 2008.

The Rogallo name lives on as members of the United States Hang Gliding and Paragliding Association are called "Rogallo" members.
