= Bill Moyes =

Australian hang gliding pioneer (1932–2024)

William Thomas John Moyes (12 July 1932 – 24 September 2024) was an Australian man who pioneered foot-launched hang gliding. He died on 24 September 2024, at the age of 92.
