= NASA Paresev =

Experimental NASA glider using the Rogallo airfoil

Paresev
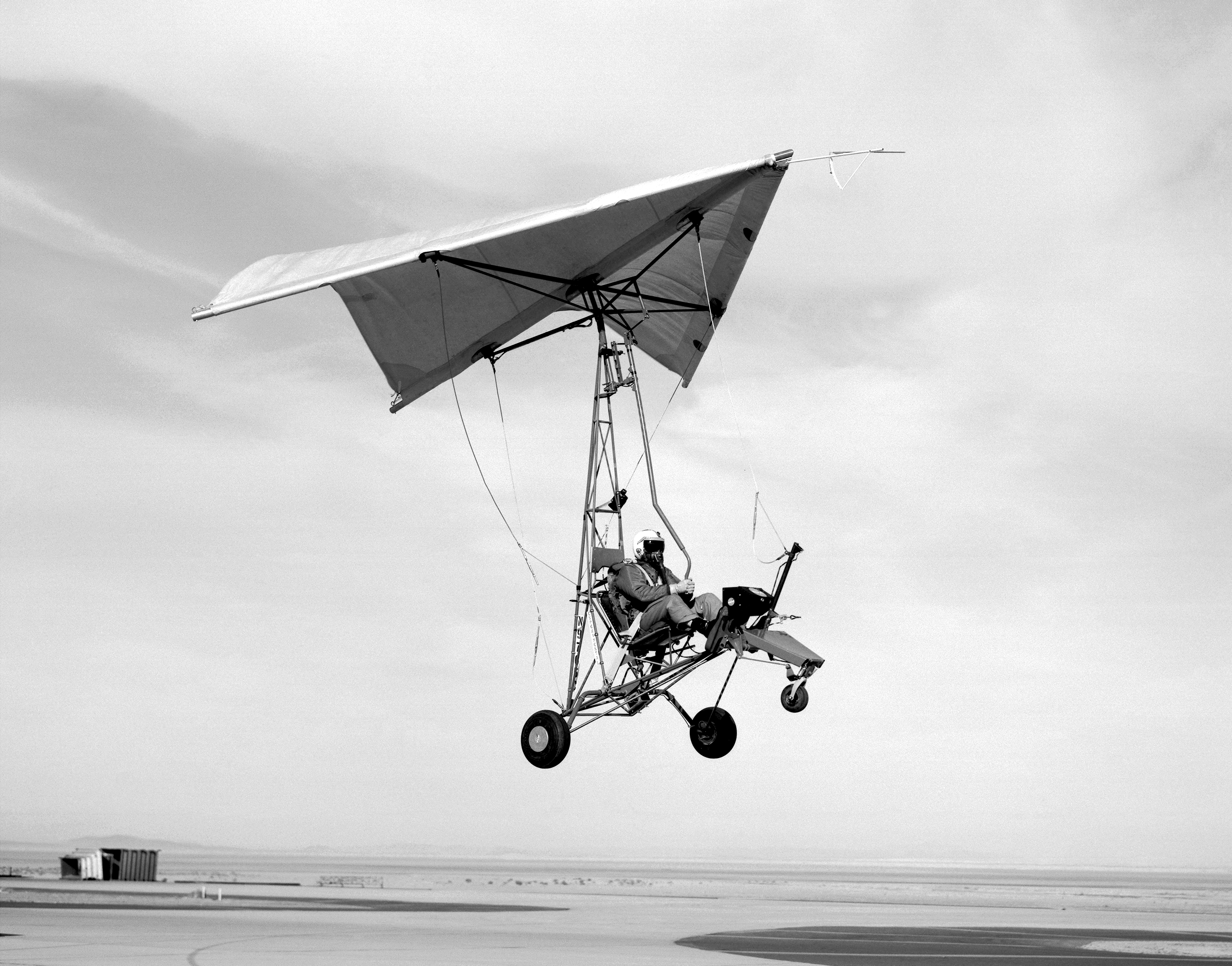
- Paresev 1 in landing, 1962

General information
- Type: Flexible-wing research glider
- Manufacturer: NASA

History
- First flight: 1962

The NASA Paresev ("Paraglider Research Vehicle") was an experimental NASA glider aircraft based upon the kite-parachute studies by NASA engineer Francis Rogallo.

Between 1961 and 1965 the ability of the Rogallo wing (also called "Parawing") to descend a payload such as the Gemini space capsule safely from high altitude to ground was studied. The Paresev was a test vehicle used to learn how to control this parachute-wing for a safe landing at a normal airfield.

Publicity on the Paresev and the Ryan XV-8 "Flying Jeep" aircraft inspired hobbyists to adapt Rogallo's flexible wing airfoil onto elementary hang gliders leading to the most successful hang glider configuration in history.

== Development ==
Paresev 1-A with tow plane

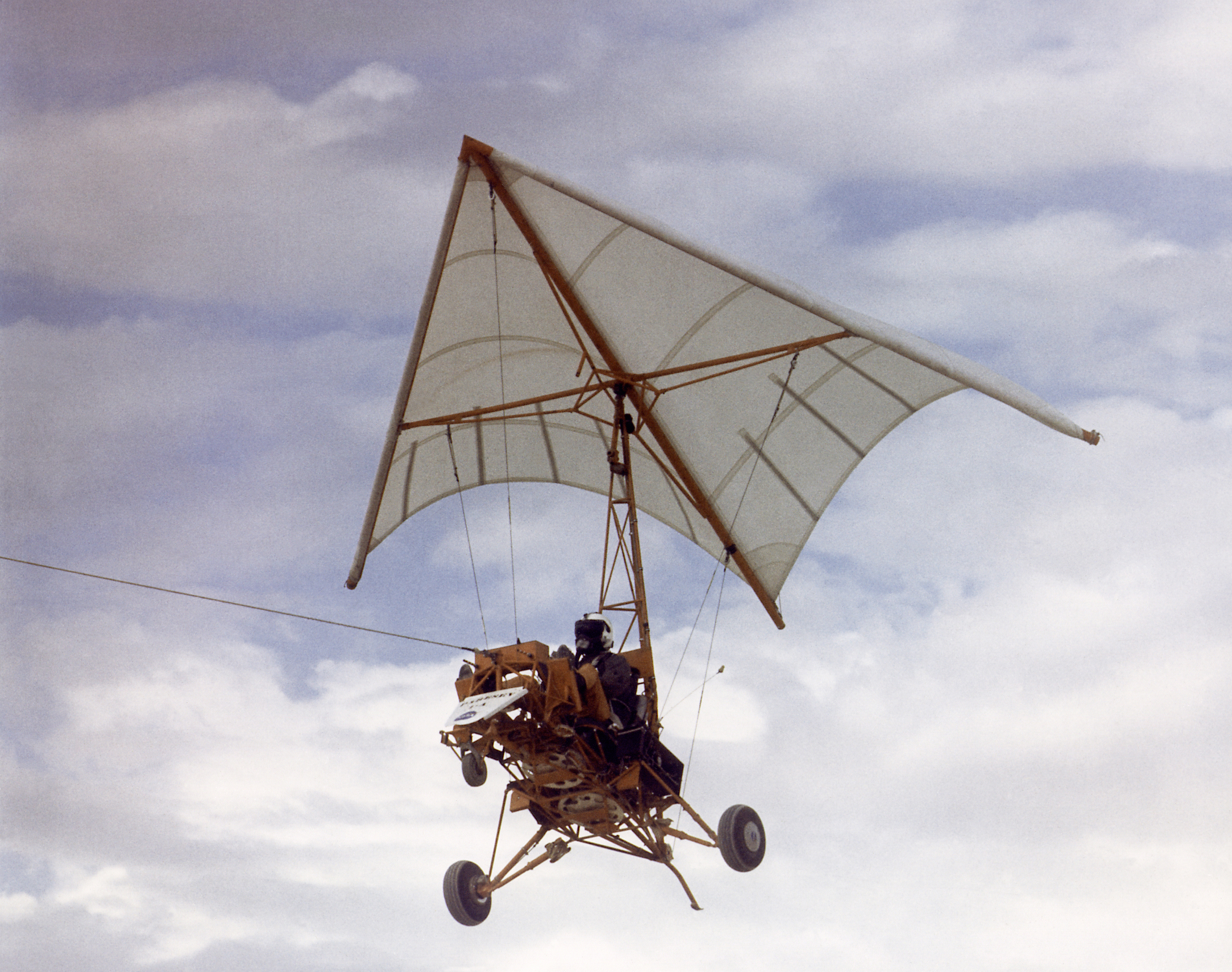
Paresev 1-B under aerotow.

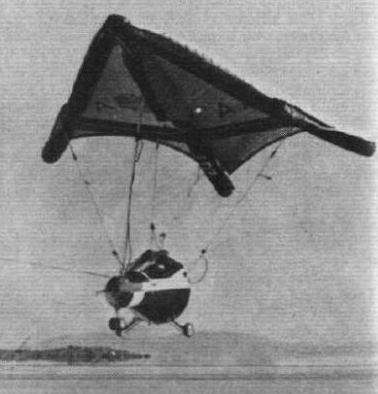
United States Gemini's Paresev glider in flight with tow cable.

NASA experimented with the flexible Rogallo wing, which they renamed the Parawing, in order to evaluate it as a recovery system for the Gemini space capsules and recovery of used Saturn rocket stages. Under a directive by Paul Bikle, NASA engineer Charles Richard in 1961–1962 designed the collapsible four-tube Rogallo wing used in the Paresev. The Paresev series included wing configurations that were tightly foldable from the nose plate for easy transport, using initially a cloth sail and later one of Dacron. The evaluations conducted at the NASA Flight Research Center, in conjunction with the aerodynamic investigations in wind tunnels, produced favorable results. However, subsequent testing revealed that achieving precise control over the responsiveness of the glider would be too difficult.

Data developed by NASA in the late 1950s fed both the Charles Richard team and a different Ryan Aeronautical team that produced the Fleep. The Paresev used a cantilevered cross-beam but did not use a kingpost.

Note that the "paraglider" involved in the early 1960s experiments is a different airfoil concept used today in paragliding.

== Design and construction ==
The Paresev 1A and 1B were unpowered; the "fuselage" was an open framework fabricated of welded SAE 4130 steel tubing, called a "space frame". The keel and leading edges of the wing were constructed of 2.5-inch-diameter (64 mm) aluminium tubing. The leading edge sweepback angle was held at 50 degrees by a rigid spreader bar. Additional wing structure fabricated from steel tubing ensured structural integrity.

The basic vehicle was slightly more than 11 ft (3.4 m) high from the top of the paraglider's wing to the ground, while the length of the center keel was 15 ft (4.6 m). Total weight was about 600 lb (270 kg) On August 24, 1962, seven weeks after the project was initiated, the team rolled out the Paresev 1.

== Control ==
The Paresev was controlled by moving the tensionally hung pilot's and fuselage's mass relative to the position of the wing. This mass-shifting was effected by tilting the wing from side to side and fore and aft by using a control stick in front of the pilot that descended from the wing above. Another version translated the same weight-shift control via cables. As the Paresev was towed in a kite mode, it usually rose from the ground at about 46 mph (74 km/h) and had a maximum air speed of about 65 mph (105 km/h).

The Paresev control pendulum weight-shift control system was presaged by a published patent, an early use of the hung pilot behind a cable-stayed triangle control bar in 1908 in the territory of Breslau, and then also by the "control wing" of George Spratt in the 1920s.

== Variants ==
- Paresev 1 - first flight on January 25, 1962, crashed on March 14, 1962. Frame fitted with a linen membrane wing and the control stick coming from overhead in front of the pilot's seat.
- Paresev 1A - first flight May 18, 1962, last flight was on June 28, 1962. Used a rebuilt frame from the Paresev 1, but had a control stick and a Dacron membrane wing.
- Paresev 1B - first flight on July 27, 1962. Last flight on Feb 20, 1963.
- Paresev 1C - first flight March 4, 1963. Last flight on April 14, 1964. It had a modified frame with a half-scale version of an inflatable parawing.

Paresev flight log (NOTE – This log is incomplete*): Paresev Flight Log

* The Paresev vehicle was flown 341 times. Thompson made numerous ground-tow flights and claimed about 60 air-tow flights. Peterson claimed 228 flights (ground and air tows). Grissom made two flights. Champine made four flights. Kleuver made at least eight flights. It is unknown how many times Armstrong, Hetzel, and Slayton flew.

== Operational history ==
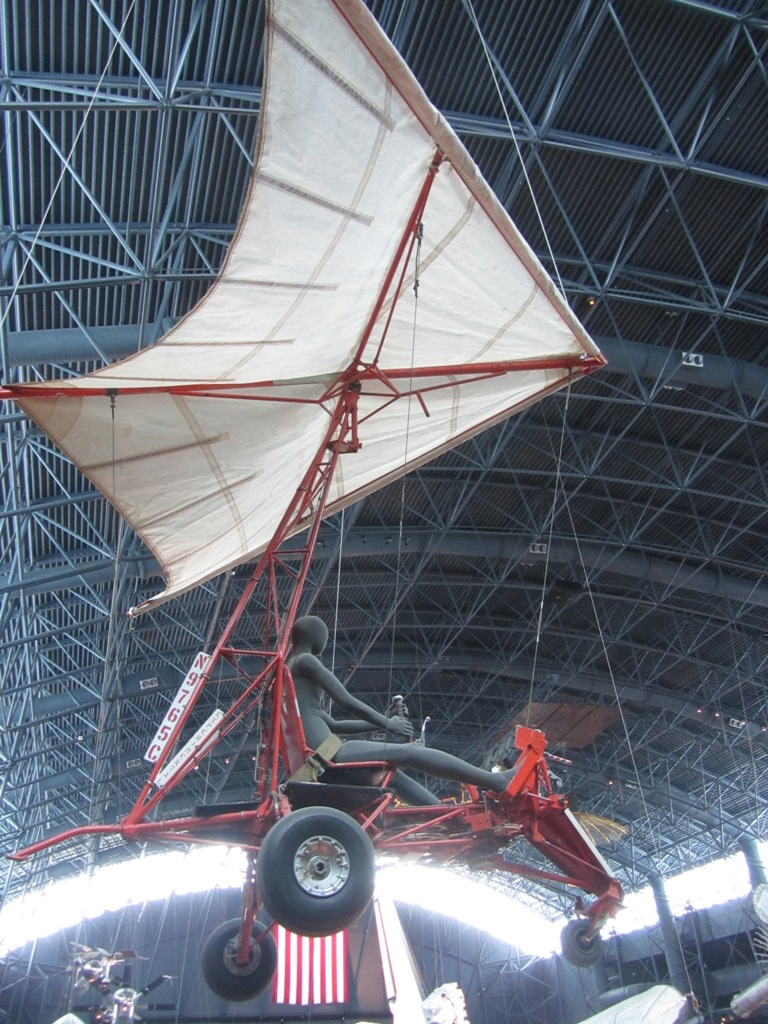
NASA Paresev 1A at the Udvar Hazy Center

The Paresev completed nearly 350 flights during a research program that ran from 1962 until 1964. Using the fully flexible parawing or the tube-stiffened paraglider of the Paresev 1A, 1B, 1C as an alternate to spacecraft recovery was deemed too unreliable upon unfolding so round parachutes for water landings were used instead. The Paresev and other flexible-wing projects such as the Ryan XV-8 stopped being funded by NASA on 1965. Although Rogallo wrote about, modeled, and spoke about recreational applications including hang gliding, NASA was not in the business of applying Rogallo's family of airfoils to personal aircraft such as kites, hang gliders, and powered light aircraft.

The Paresev was transferred to the Smithsonian National Air and Space Museum located in Washington, D.C. for display.

== Test pilots ==
- Milton Orville Thompson, NASA FRC
- Robert Apgar Champine, NASA LRC
- Neil A. Armstrong, NASA FRC
- Bruce A. Peterson, NASA FRC
- Charles Hetzel, North American Aviation
- Maj. Emil "Jack" Kluever, U.S. Army
- Donald K. "Deke" Slayton, NASA MSC
- Virgil I. "Gus" Grissom, NASA MSC

== Tow aircraft ==
- Piper PA-18 Super Cub (N-68P)
- Cessna O-1 Bird Dog (50-1675)
- Stearman (N69056)
- Boeing HC-1A helicopter (58-5515)

== Specifications ==
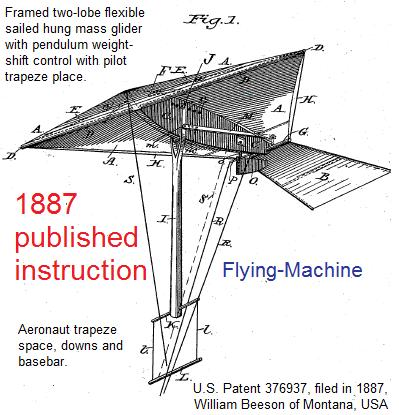

Data from

General characteristics

- Crew: One pilot
- Length: 15 ft 0 in (4.57 m)
- Height: 11 ft 0 in (3.35 m)
- Wing area: 179 sq ft (16.6 m^{2})
- Gross weight: 600 lb (270 kg)

Performance

- Maximum speed: 65 mph (100 km/h, 56 kn)

== See also ==
- History of hang gliding
- Ultralight trike – Powered hang glider
