= Unpowered flight =

Flight without the use of thrust

Unpowered flight is flight through an atmosphere or space without using any active propulsion. Unpowered flight can be achieved via numerous mechanisms, including lifting gas (buoyancy), updraft, aerodynamic lift and ballistics, and some of these physical principles have been exploited by nature and by humankind.

In aerospace engineering, the term unpowered flight typically concerns unpowered aircraft, which are aerial vehicles (both lighter-than-air and heavier-than-air) that can stay airborne in a predictable manner without involving any propulsive output. It is also of interest in aviation safety regarding deadstick landing during incidences of fuel starvation and turbine engine failure.

In nature, many organisms, particularly terrestrial animals, are capable of sustained flight by aerodynamic interaction between air currents and appendages with large wetted area typically known as wings or patagia. The ability of flying and gliding animals to stay airborne short or long distances has evolved many times, and active flight is common among winged insects, birds and bats, while unpowered gliding flight and kiting can be seen in insects (e.g. gliding ant), arachnids (some spiders and spider mites), molluscs (e.g. flying squid), fish (e.g. flying fish, freshwater hatchetfish), amphibians (flying frogs), reptiles (flying lizards and flying snakes) and mammals (e.g. flying squirrels, gliders, flying lemurs).

== Flight without power ==
=== Classification of flight methods ===
Pennycuick divides animal flight into three types: parachuting, gliding and powered. He observes however that these have no sharp boundaries. For example, at one point he sees parachutes as unpowered and as a primitive form of soaring, while soaring itself he sees as being powered by air movement (wind). Other methods, such as lighter-than-air flight, are used only by man.

This article makes the following distinctions between types or methods of unpowered flight, based on their characteristics:

- Lighter than air - Sustained flight, buoyed by a density less than air with no forward motion required,
- Drifting - Sustained free flight due to slow rate of descent compared to speed of updraft,
- Parachuting - Vertical descent slowed by high air resistance, though possibly with a minor horizontal motion (or sometimes defined as flight at a glide angle greater than 45 deg.),
- Gliding - Forward flight with smooth airflow (or sometimes defined as flight with a glide angle less than 45 deg),
- Soaring - Sustained free gliding flight, drawing energy from rising air,
- Kiting - Tethered flight using an angled plane to create an upward force from the wind.

These are summarised in the table:

Flight characteristics and methods
		Flight mode		
		Short duration	Sustained free flight	Tethered
Forward motion through the air	None	Not classified as flight	Lighter than air Drifting	Lighter than air
Forward motion through the air	Slower than downward motion	Parachuting	Parachuting	Not classified as flight
Forward motion through the air	Faster than downward motion	Gliding	Soaring	Kiting

=== Flight methods and usage ===
Some examples of usage are shown in the following table:

Flight methods vs. usage
	Aircraft	Animals	Plants and fungi
Lighter than air	Balloon	—	—
Drifting	—	Small insects	Spores, Orchid seeds
Parachuting	Parachute	Spider kite	Rotary wings (maple, sycamore); Hairs (dandelion)
Gliding	Glider	Flying squirrel	Winged seeds (Alsomitra macrocarpa)
Soaring	Sailplane	Albatross	
Kiting	Kite; Rotor kite		

== Lighter than air ==
Lighter than air flight is only used by man. An unpowered, lighter than air craft is called a balloon.

=== Balloons ===
A balloon is a bag filled with a gas with a lower density than the surrounding air to provide buoyancy. The gas may be hot air, hydrogen, helium or, in the past, coal gas. The use of buoyant gases is unknown in the natural world.

A balloon may be tethered like a kite or drift with the wind in free flight. The pilot can control the altitude of a free-flying balloon, either by heating the gas or by releasing ballast weight. The wind direction often changes with altitude, so this can give some degree of directional control.

== Drifting ==
A free-falling object without any adaptation to flight can only be sustained by the wind if it is very light and falls more slowly than the wind blows it upwards. A sufficiently light object can make use of updrafts and drift on the wind in this way for long periods of time.

Many mould and bacterial spores, even live bacteria, are small enough to drift for long distances and to great heights on the wind.

Some plants also use the wind for seed dispersal in this way. Orchid seeds are very small and dust-like.

== Parachuting ==
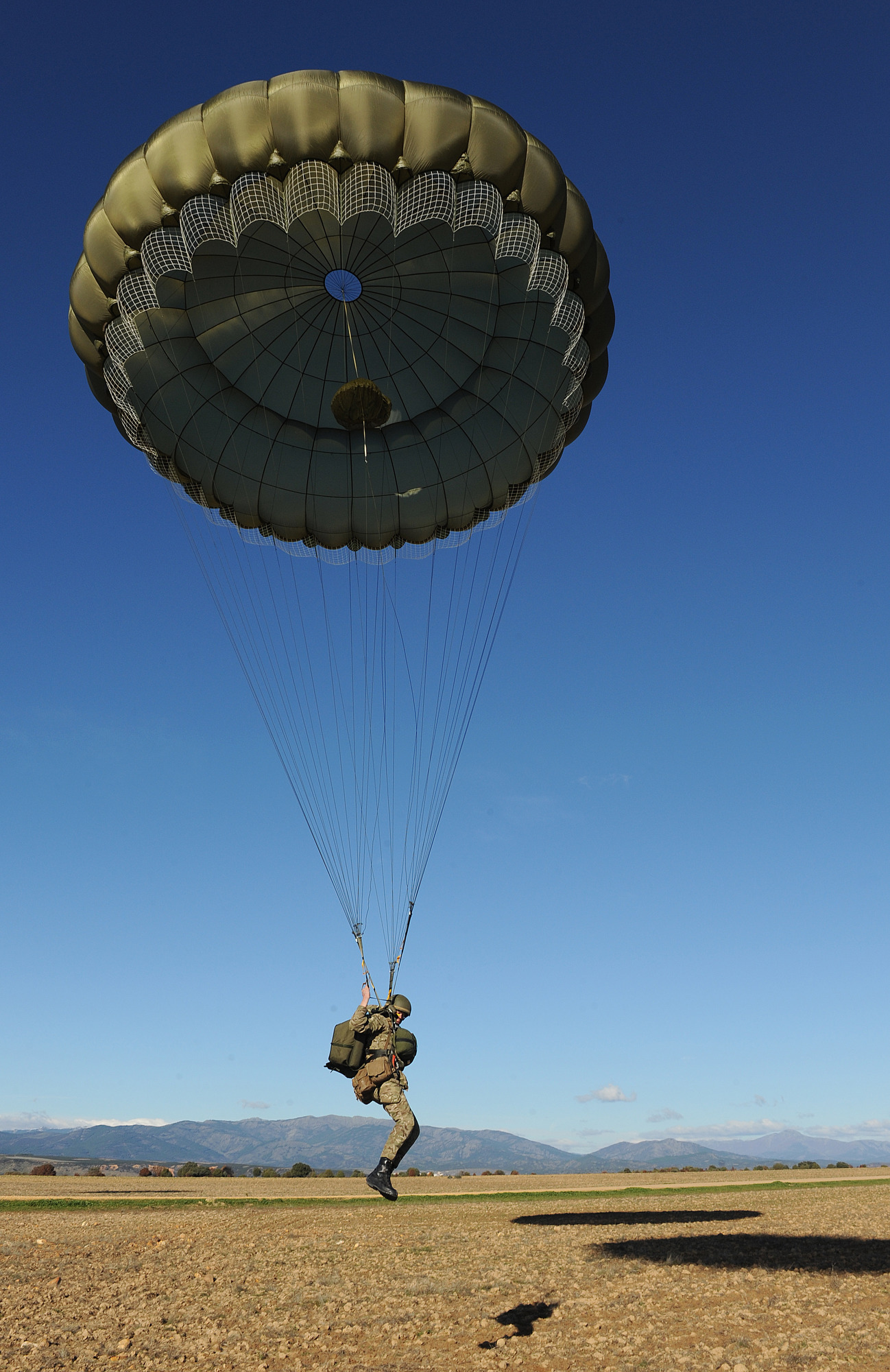
A British paratrooper comes in to land

Parachuting is essentially falling or drifting but with an aerodynamic braking surface. The high ratio of surface area to weight reduces the rate of descent of the parachute, allowing it to stay airborne for longer periods. The aerodynamic surface may also allow a small amount of forward motion, but a parachute always falls faster than it can travel forwards. The airflow around a parachute is typically turbulent.

Small creatures and seeds that have evolved parachutes can be blown on the wind for long distances. Among the plants, Dandelion, milkweed and poplar) seeds have hairs that act as parachutes. Some spiders cast parachutes of thread. Although mostly done by small spiderlings, adults weighing over 100 mg and with a body size of up to 14 mm have been observed casting parachutes a meter across into a strong updraft.

Parachuting is also used by larger creatures and seeds to travel shorter distances. Maple, pine and sycamore seeds have one or two wings that act like parachutes to aid in seed dispersal. Flying frogs use their webbed feet as parachutes.

== Gliding ==
Gliding flight requires an initial launch giving the object enough energy to fly.

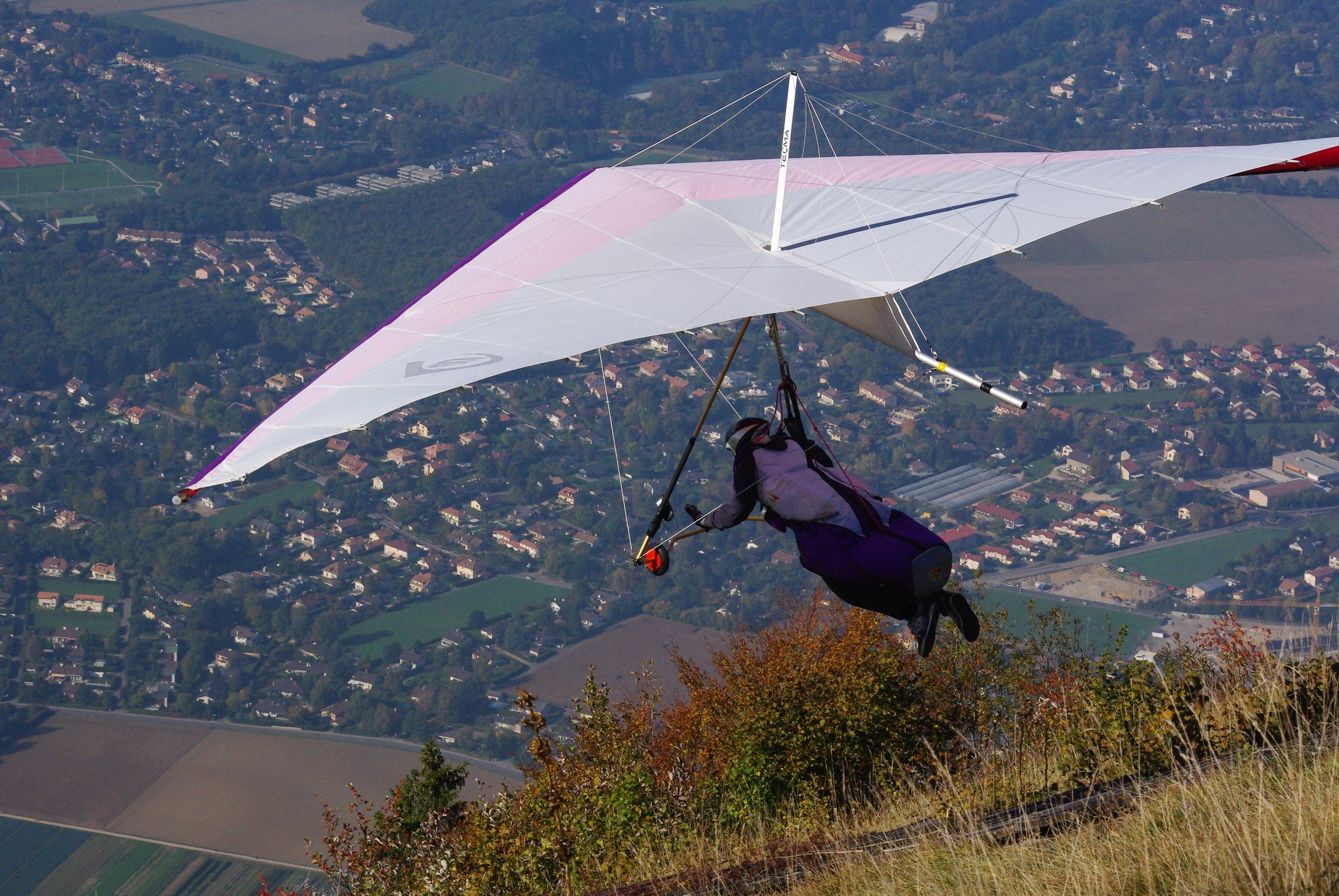
Hang glider just after launch from Salève, France

=== Aerodynamic lift ===
The principles of aerodynamic lift are shared by both nature and man-made aircraft. As the aeronaut falls, outspread wings are angled to the oncoming air to create a fast forward flow of air over the wing. This flow generates aerodynamic lift which slows the rate of descent. The result is gliding flight as opposed to a simple descent like a parachute.

If the air is rising faster than the object is descending, it will be carried upwards. In this way a gliding object can gain additional potential energy from sources such as thermals and ridge lift.

=== Glider aircraft ===
Glider aircraft include sailplanes, hang gliders and paragliders. They must gain their initial energy of motion from a launch process. The launch may be by pulling the aircraft into the air with a tow-line, with a ground-based winch or vehicle, or with a powered "tug" aircraft. For foot-launched aircraft, there is also the option of merely stepping off a high location. Once the glider is released, it flies freely.

=== Gliding animals ===
Creatures able to launch themselves into the air and glide short distances include:

- Flying squirrels
- Petaurus marsupials
- Flying snakes
- Flying dragon lizards
- Flying fish

== Soaring ==
Unpowered flights of longer duration and distance are possible if rising air is used to gain energy. This can further reduce the rate of descent or even increase height, which is known as soaring.

Soaring is where the object/animal obtains additional energy from rising air without exerting any power to remain airborne. An example is the albatross, which is a large seabird renowned for its ability to stay aloft by soaring above the waves for days at a time. Many other birds such as raptors and storks also deliberately soar to extend their time aloft. Insects are often caught by rising air and so can be dispersed by it.

Many types of glider aircraft are designed to exploit rising air and can therefore also soar.

== Kiting ==
An airflow over a tethered object can gain it height up to a maximum determined partly by the length of the tether, and then enable it to maintain height while there is sufficient airflow. Such a tethered flying object is called a kite.

If there is a wind, the tether may be attached to a fixed point. The motion of an object such as a speedboat can also be used to create an airflow or to augment the wind. The mobile object can even be another kite.

Manned kites have been flown for a variety of purposes.

== See also ==
- Kite types
- Gliding
- Flying and gliding animals
