= Glider (aircraft) =

Aircraft designed for operation without an engine

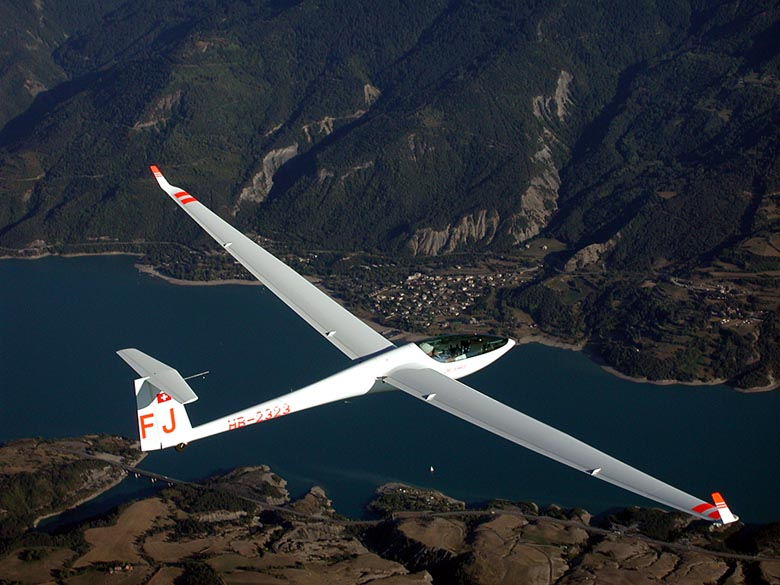
Single-seat high performance fiberglass Glaser-Dirks DG-808 glider

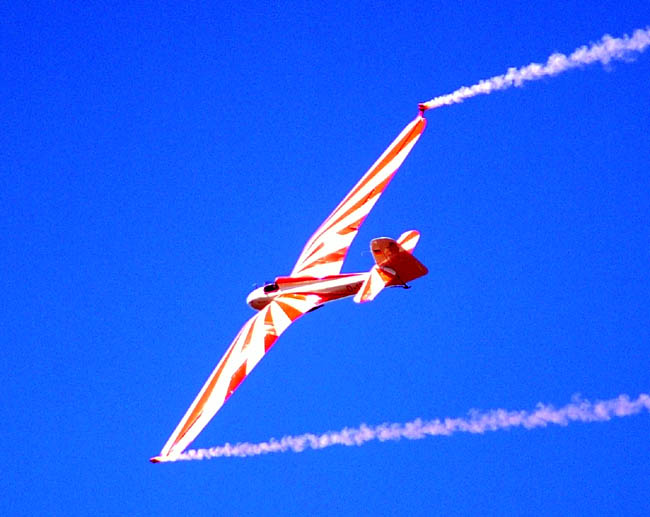
Aerobatic glider with tip smoke, pictured on July 2, 2005, in Lappeenranta, Finland

A glider is a fixed-wing aircraft that is supported in flight by the dynamic reaction of the air against its lifting surfaces, and whose free flight does not depend on an engine. Most gliders do not have an engine, although motor-gliders have small engines for extending their flight when necessary by sustaining the altitude (normally a sailplane relies on rising air to maintain altitude) with some being powerful enough to take off by self-launch.

There are a wide variety of types differing in the construction of their wings, aerodynamic efficiency, location of the pilot, controls and intended purpose. Most exploit meteorological phenomena to maintain or gain height. Gliders are principally used for the air sports of gliding, hang gliding and paragliding. However some spacecraft have been designed to descend as gliders and in the past military gliders have been used in warfare. Some simple and familiar types of glider are toys such as paper planes and balsa wood gliders.

== Etymology ==
Glider is the agent noun form of the verb to glide. It derives from Middle English gliden, which in turn derived from Old English glīdan. The oldest meaning of glide may have denoted a precipitous running or jumping, as opposed to a smooth motion. Scholars are uncertain as to its original derivation, with possible connections to "slide", and "light" having been advanced.

== History ==
Early pre-modern accounts of flight are in most cases difficult to verify and it is unclear whether each craft was a glider, kite or parachute and to what degree they were truly controllable. Often the event is only recorded a long time after it allegedly took place. A 17th-century account reports an attempt at flight by the 9th-century poet Abbas Ibn Firnas near Córdoba, Spain which ended in heavy back injuries. The monk Eilmer of Malmesbury is reported by William of Malmesbury (c. 1080 – c. 1143), a fellow monk and historian, to have flown off the roof of his Abbey in Malmesbury, England, sometime between 1000 and 1010 AD, gliding about 200 metres (220 yd) before crashing and breaking his legs. According to these reports, both used a set of (feathery) wings, and both blamed their crash on the lack of a tail. Hezârfen Ahmed Çelebi is alleged to have flown a glider with eagle-like wings over the Bosphorus strait from the Galata Tower to Üsküdar district in Istanbul around 1630–1632.

=== 19th century ===
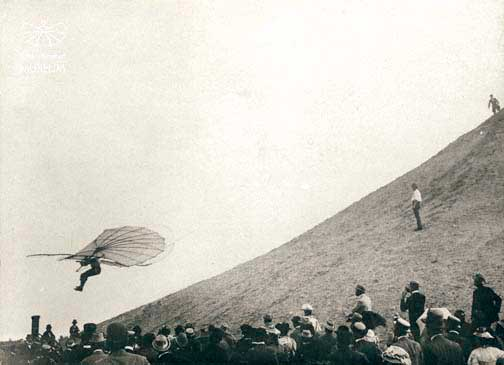
Otto Lilienthal in flight

The first heavier-than-air (i.e. non-balloon) man-carrying aircraft that were based on published scientific principles were Sir George Cayley's series of gliders which achieved brief wing-borne hops from around 1849. Thereafter gliders were built by pioneers such as Jean Marie Le Bris, John J. Montgomery, Otto Lilienthal, Percy Pilcher, Octave Chanute and Augustus Moore Herring to develop aviation. Lilienthal was the first to make repeated successful flights (eventually totaling over 2,000) and was the first to use rising air to prolong his flight. Using a Montgomery tandem-wing glider, Daniel Maloney was the first to demonstrate high-altitude controlled flight using a balloon-launched glider launched from 4,000 feet in 1905.

The Wright Brothers developed a series of three manned gliders after preliminary tests with a kite as they worked towards achieving powered flight. They returned to glider testing in 1911 by removing the motor from one of their later designs.

=== Development ===
In the inter-war years, recreational gliding flourished in Germany under the auspices of Rhön-Rossitten. In the United States, the Schweizer brothers of Elmira, New York, manufactured sport sailplanes to meet the new demand. Sailplanes continued to evolve in the 1930s, and sport gliding has become the main application of gliders. As their performance improved, gliders began to be used to fly cross-country and now regularly fly hundreds or even over a thousand of kilometers in a day, if the weather is suitable.

Military gliders were developed during World War II by a number of countries for landing troops. A glider – the Colditz Cock – was even built secretly by POWs as a potential escape method at Oflag IV-C near the end of the war in 1944.

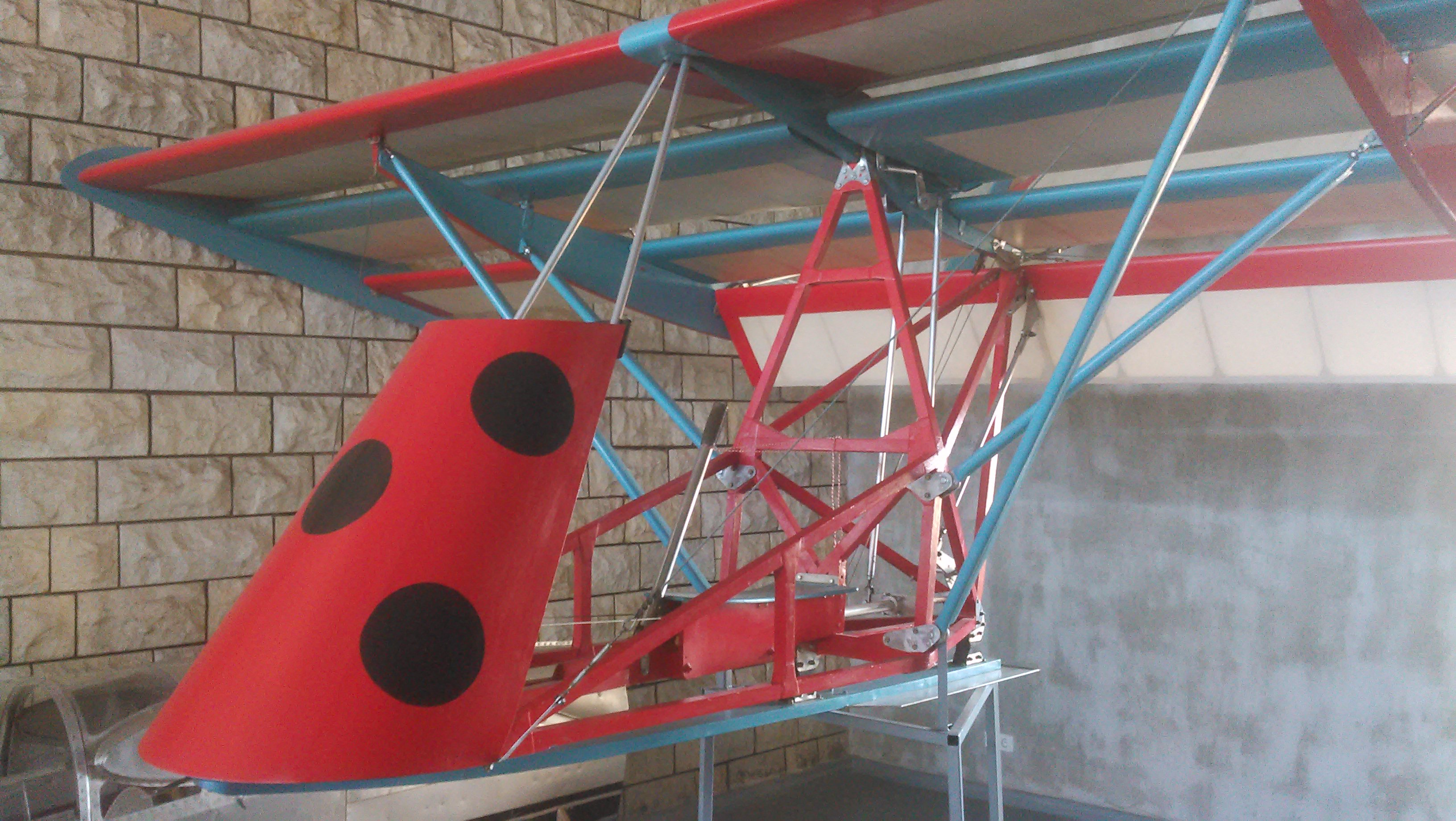
Smallest glider in the world – BrO-18 "Boružė" (Ladybird), constructed in Lithuania in 1975

=== Development of flexible-wing hang gliders ===
Foot-launched aircraft had been flown by Lilienthal and at the meetings at Wasserkuppe in the 1920s. However the innovation that led to modern hang gliders was in 1951 when Francis Rogallo and Gertrude Rogallo applied for a patent for a fully flexible wing with a stiffening structure. The American space agency NASA began testing in various flexible and semi-rigid configurations of this Rogallo wing in 1957 in order to use it as a recovery system for the Gemini space capsules. Charles Richards and Paul Bikle developed the concept producing a wing that was simple to build which was capable of slow flight and as gentle landing. Between 1960 and 1962 Barry Hill Palmer used this concept to make foot-launched hang gliders, followed in 1963 by Mike Burns who built a kite-hang glider called Skiplane. In 1963, John W. Dickenson began commercial production.

=== Development of paragliders ===
January 10, 1963 American Domina Jalbert filed a patent US Patent 3131894 on the Parafoil which had sectioned cells in an aerofoil shape; an open leading edge and a closed trailing edge, inflated by passage through the air – the ram-air design. The 'Sail Wing' was developed further for recovery of NASA space capsules by David Barish. Testing was done by using ridge lift. After tests on Hunter Mountain, New York in September 1965, he went on to promote "slope soaring" as a summer activity for ski resorts (apparently without great success). NASA originated the term "paraglider" in the early 1960s, and ‘paragliding’ was first used in the early 1970s to describe foot-launching of gliding parachutes. Although their use is mainly recreational, unmanned paragliders have also been built for military applications e.g. Atair Insect.

== Recreational types ==
(video) A glider sails over Gunma, Japan.

The main application today of glider aircraft is sport and recreation.

=== Sailplane ===
Gliders were developed from the 1920s for recreational purposes. As pilots began to understand how to use rising air, gliders were developed with a high lift-to-drag ratio. These allowed longer glides to the next source of 'lift', and so increase their chances of flying long distances. This gave rise to the popular sport known as gliding although the term can also be used to refer to merely descending flight. Such gliders designed for soaring are sometimes called sailplanes.

Gliders were mainly built of wood and metal but the majority now have composite materials using glass, carbon fibre and aramid fibers. To minimise drag, these types have a fuselage and long narrow wings, i.e. a high aspect ratio. In the beginning, there were huge differences in the appearance of early-sailplanes. As technology and materials developed, the aspiration for the perfect balance between lift/drag, climbing ratio and gliding speed, made engineers from various producers create similar designs across the world. Both single-seat and two-seat gliders are available.

Initially training was done by short 'hops' in primary gliders which are very basic aircraft with no cockpit and minimal instruments. Since shortly after World War II training has always been done in two-seat dual control gliders, but high performance two-seaters are also used to share the workload and the enjoyment of long flights. Originally skids were used for landing, but the majority now land on wheels, often retractable. Some gliders, known as motor gliders, are designed for unpowered flight, but can deploy piston, rotary, jet or electric engines. Gliders are classified by the FAI for competitions into glider competition classes mainly on the basis of span and flaps.

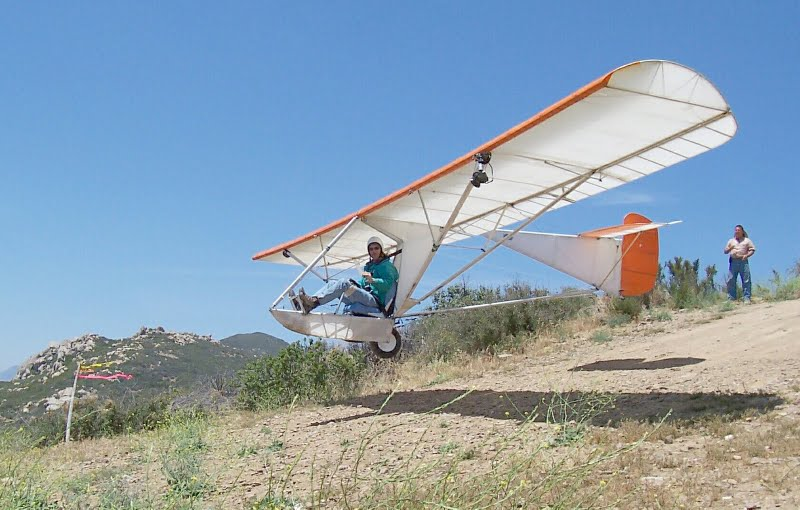
Ultralight "airchair" Sandlin Goat 1 glider

A class of ultralight sailplanes, including some known as microlift gliders and some as 'airchairs', has been defined by the FAI based on a maximum weight. They are light enough to be transported easily, and can be flown without licensing in some countries. Ultralight gliders have performance similar to hang gliders, but offer some additional crash safety as the pilot can be strapped in an upright seat within a deformable structure. Landing is usually on one or two wheels which distinguishes these craft from hang gliders. Several commercial ultralight gliders have come and gone, but most current development is done by individual designers and home builders.

=== Hang gliders ===
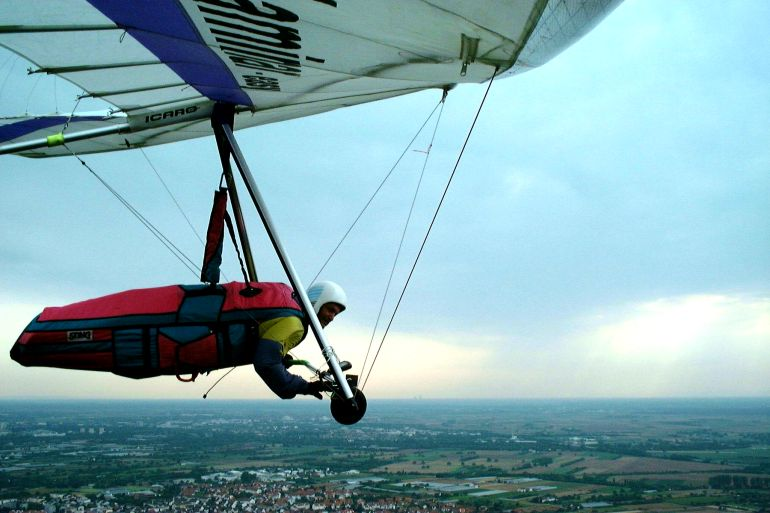
Modern 'flexible wing' hang glider.

Unlike a sailplane, a hang glider is capable of being carried, foot launched and landed solely by the use of the pilot's legs.

- In the original and still most common designs, Class 1, the pilot is suspended from the center of the flexible wing and controls the aircraft by shifting their weight.
- Class 2 (designated by the FAI as Sub-Class O-2) have a rigid primary structure with movable aerodynamic surfaces, such as spoilers, as the primary method of control. The pilot is often enclosed by means of a fairing. These offer the best performance and are the most expensive.
- Class 4 hang gliders are unable to demonstrate consistent ability to safely take-off and/or land in nil-wind conditions, but otherwise are capable of being launched and landed by the use of the pilot's legs.
- Class 5 hang gliders have a rigid primary structure with movable aerodynamic surfaces as the primary method of control and can safely take-off and land in nil-wind conditions. No pilot fairings are permitted.

In a hang glider the shape of the wing is determined by a structure, and it is this that distinguishes them from the other main type of foot-launched aircraft, paragliders, technically Class 3. Some hang gliders have engines, and are known as powered hang gliders. Due to their commonality of parts, construction and design, they are usually considered by aviation authorities to be hang gliders, even though they may use the engine for the entire flight. Some flexible wing powered aircraft, Ultralight trikes, have a wheeled undercarriage, and so are not hang gliders.

=== Paragliders ===
A paraglider taking off in Brazil

A paraglider is a free-flying, foot-launched aircraft. The pilot sits in a harness suspended below a fabric wing. Unlike a hang glider whose wings have frames, the form of a paraglider wing is formed by the pressure of air entering vents or cells in the front of the wing. This is known as a ram-air wing (similar to the smaller parachute design). The paraglider's light and simple design allows them to be packed and carried in large backpacks, and make them one of the simplest and economical modes of flight. Competition level wings can achieve glide ratios up to 1:10 and fly around speeds of 45 km/h (28 mph).

Like sailplanes and hang gliders, paragliders use rising air (thermals or ridge lift) to gain height. This process is the basis for most recreational flights and competitions, though aerobatics and 'spot landing competitions' also occur. Launching is often done by jogging down a slope, but winch launches behind a towing vehicle are also used. A Paramotor is a paraglider wing powered by a motor attached to the back of the pilot, and is also known as a powered paraglider. A variation of this is the paraplane, which has a motor mounted on a wheeled frame rather than the pilot's back.

=== Comparison of gliders, hang gliders and paragliders ===
There can be confusion between gliders, hang gliders, and paragliders. Paragliders and hang gliders are both foot-launched glider aircraft and in both cases the pilot is suspended ("hangs") below the lift surface. "Hang glider" is the term for those where the airframe contains rigid structures, whereas the primary structure of paragliders is supple, consisting mainly of woven material.

	Paragliders	Hang gliders	Gliders/Sailplanes
Undercarriage	pilot's legs used for take-off and landing	pilot's legs used for take-off and landing	aircraft takes off and lands using a wheeled undercarriage or skids
Wing structure	entirely flexible, with shape maintained purely by the pressure of air flowing into and over the wing in flight and the tension of the lines	generally flexible but supported on a rigid frame which determines its shape (note that rigid-wing hang gliders also exist)	rigid wing surface which totally encases wing structure
Pilot position	sitting in a harness	usually lying prone in a cocoon-like harness suspended from the wing; seated and supine are also possible	sitting in a seat with a harness, surrounded by a crash-resistant structure
Speed range (stall speed – max speed)	slowest – typically 25 to 60 km/h for recreational gliders (over 50 km/h requires use of speed bar), hence easier to launch and fly in light winds; least wind penetration; pitch variation can be achieved with the controls	faster than paragliders, slower than gliders/sailplaines	maximum speed up to about 280 km/h (170 mph); stall speed typically 65 km/h (40 mph); able to fly in windier turbulent conditions and can outrun bad weather; good penetration into a headwind
Maximum glide ratio	about 10, relatively poor glide performance makes long distance flights more difficult; current (as of July 2025) world record is 609.9 kilometres (380 mi)	about 17, with up to 20 for rigid wings	open class sailplanes – typically around 60:1, but in more common 15–18 meter span aircraft, glide ratios are between 38:1 and 52:1; high glide performance enabling long distance flight, with 3,000 kilometres (1,900 mi) being current (as of November 2010) record
Turn radius	tightest turn radius	somewhat larger turn radius than paragliders, tighter than gliders/sailplanes	widest turn radius but still able to circle tightly in thermals
Landing	smallest space needed to land, offering more landing options from cross-country flights; also easiest to pack up and carry like a bag to the nearest road	15 m to 60 m length flat area required; can be derigged by one person and carried to the nearest road	landings can be performed in ~250 m length field. Aerial retrieval may be possible but if not, specialized trailer needed to retrieve by road. Some sailplanes have engines that remove the need for an out-landing, if successfully started on time
Learning	simplest and quickest to learn	teaching is done in single and two-seat hang gliders	teaching is done in a two-seat glider with dual controls
Convenience	packs smaller (easier to transport and store)	more awkward to transport and store; longer to rig and de-rig; often transported on the roof of a car	often stored and transported in purpose-built trailers about 9 metres long, from which they are rigged. Although rigging aids allow a single person to rig a glider, usually the rigging involves 2 or 3 people. Some frequently used sailplanes are stored already rigged in hangars.
Cost	cost of new is €1500 and up, cheapest but shortest lasting (around 500 hours flying time, depending on treatment), active second-hand market		cost of new glider very high (top of the range 18 m turbo with instruments and trailer €250,000) but it is long lasting (up to several decades), so active second-hand market; typical cost is from €2,000 to €145,000

== Military gliders ==
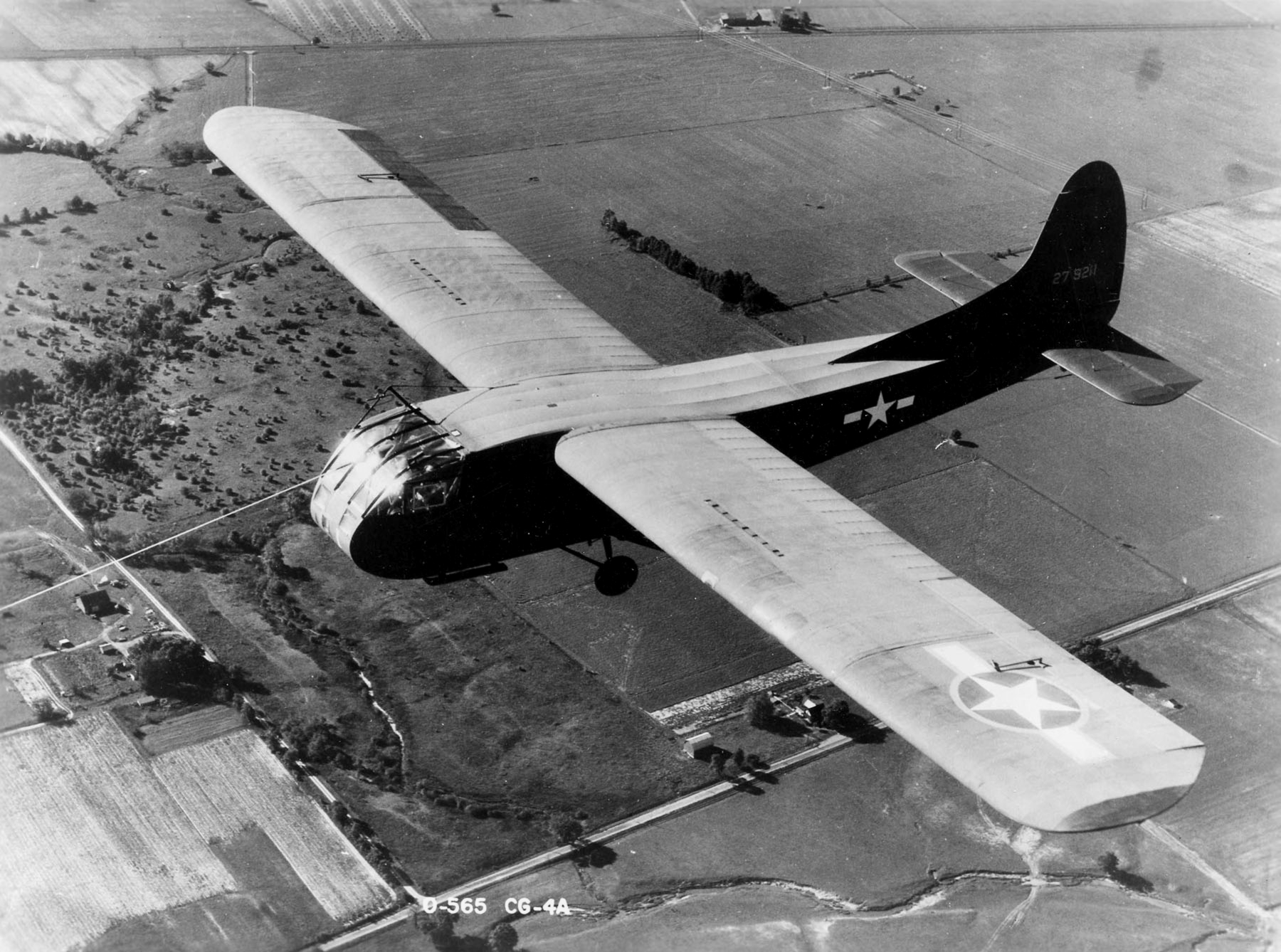
Waco CG-4A of the USAF

Military gliders were used mainly during the Second World War for carrying troops and heavy equipment (see Glider infantry) to a combat zone, including the British Airspeed Horsa, Russian Polikarpov BDP S-1, American Waco CG-3, Japanese Kokusai Ku-8, and German Junkers Ju 322. These aircraft were towed into the air and most of the way to their target by military transport planes, e.g. C-47 Dakota, or by bombers that had been relegated to secondary activities, e.g. Short Stirling. Once released from the tow near the target, they landed as close to the target as possible. Advantages over paratroopers were that heavy equipment could be landed and that the troops were quickly assembled rather than being dispersed over a drop zone. The gliders were treated as disposable leading to construction from common and inexpensive materials such as wood, though a few were retrieved and re-used. By the time of the Korean War, transport aircraft had also become larger and more efficient so that even light tanks could be dropped by parachute, causing gliders to fall out of favor.

== Research aircraft ==
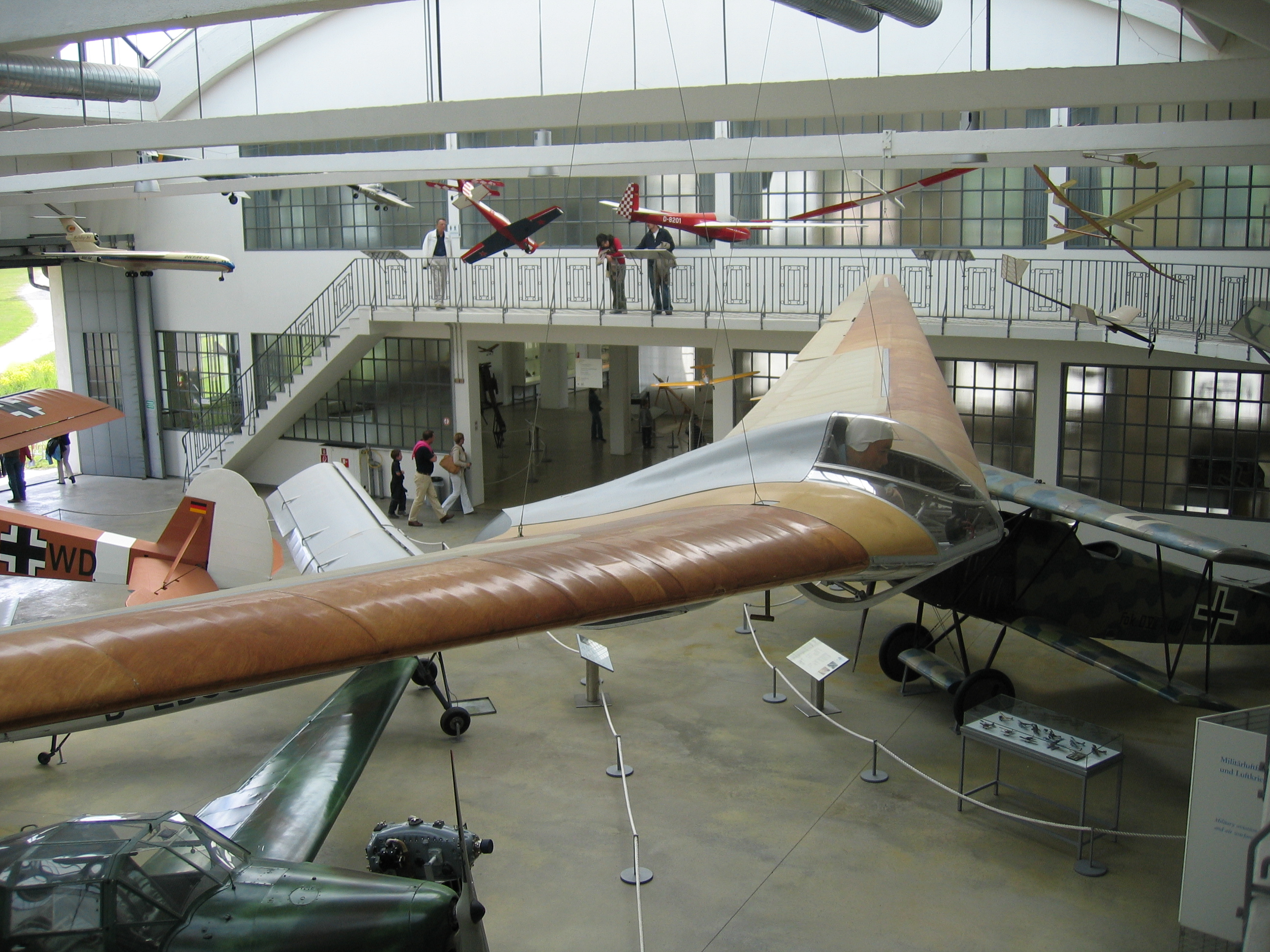
Horten Ho IV flying wing sailplane prone seating glider

Even after the development of powered aircraft, gliders have been built for research, where the lack of powerplant reduces complexity and construction costs and speeds development, particularly where new and poorly understood aerodynamic ideas are being tested that might require significant airframe changes. Examples have included delta wings, flying wings, lifting bodies and other unconventional lifting surfaces where existing theories were not sufficiently developed to estimate full scale characteristics.

Unpowered flying wings built for aerodynamic research include the Horten flying wings, the scaled glider version of the Armstrong Whitworth A.W.52 jet powered flying wing.

Lifting bodies were also developed using unpowered prototypes. Although the idea can be dated to Vincent Justus Burnelli in 1921, interest was nearly non-existent until it appeared to be a solution for returning spacecraft. Traditional space capsules have little directional control while conventionally winged craft cannot handle the stresses of re-entry, whereas a lifting body combines the benefits of both. The lifting bodies use the fuselage itself to generate lift without employing the usual thin and flat wing so as to minimize the drag and structure of a wing for very high supersonic or hypersonic flight as might be experienced during the re-entry of a spacecraft. Examples of type are the Northrop HL-10 and Martin-Marietta X-24.

The NASA Paresev Rogallo flexible wing glider was built to investigate alternative methods of recovering spacecraft. Although this application was abandoned, publicity inspired hobbyists to adapt the flexible wing airfoil for modern hang gliders.

== Rocket gliders ==
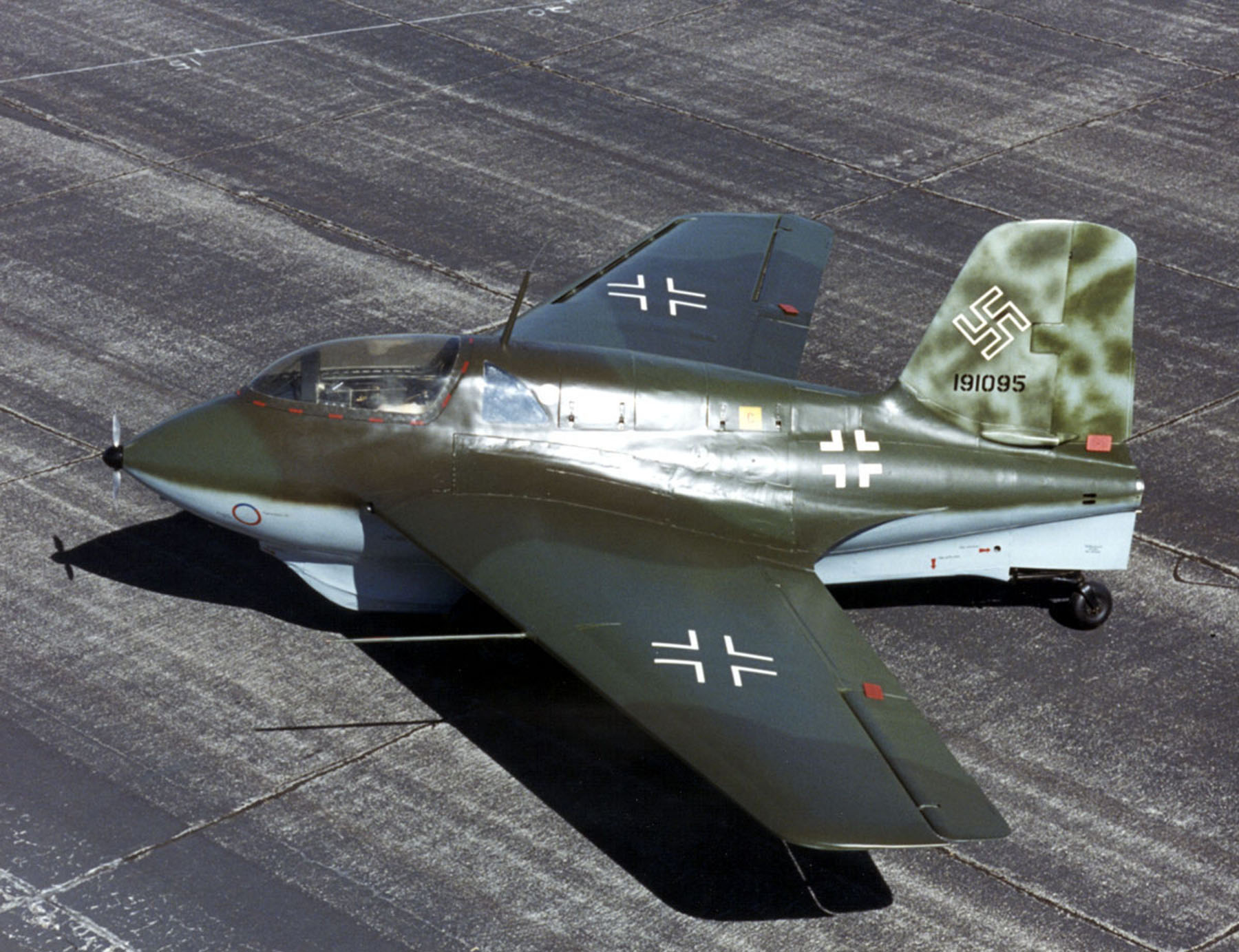
Me 163B on display at the National Museum of the USAF

Rocket-powered aircraft consume their fuel quickly and so most must land unpowered unless there is another power source. The first rocket plane was the Lippisch Ente, and later examples include the Messerschmitt Me 163 rocket-powered interceptor. The American series of research aircraft starting with the Bell X-1 in 1946 up to the North American X-15 spent more time flying unpowered than under power. In the 1960s research was also done on unpowered lifting bodies and on the X-20 Dyna-Soar project, but although the X20 was cancelled, this research eventually led to the Space Shuttle.

NASA's Space Shuttle first flew on April 12, 1981. The Shuttle re-entered at Mach 25 at the end of each spaceflight, landing entirely as a glider. The Space Shuttle and its Soviet equivalent, the Buran shuttle, were by far the fastest ever aircraft. Recent examples of rocket glider include the privately funded SpaceShipOne which is intended for sub-orbital flight and the XCOR EZ-Rocket which is being used to test engines.

== Rotary wing ==
Most unpowered rotary-wing aircraft are kites rather than gliders, i.e. they are usually towed behind a car or boat rather than being capable of free flight. These are known as rotor kites. However rotary-winged gliders, 'gyrogliders', were investigated that could descend like an autogyro, using the lift from rotors to reduce the vertical speed. These were evaluated as a method of dropping people or equipment from other aircraft.

== Unmanned gliders ==
=== Paper airplane ===
People throwing paper airplanes

A toy glider can be made out of folded paper or paperboard. The practice of constructing such paper planes is sometimes referred to as aerogami (Japanese: kamihikōki), after origami, the Japanese art of paper folding.

=== Model gliders ===
Model glider aircraft are flying or non-flying models of existing or imaginary gliders, often scaled-down versions of full size planes, using lightweight materials such as polystyrene, balsa wood, foam and fibreglass. Designs range from simple glider aircraft, to accurate scale models, some of which can be very large.

Larger outdoor models are usually radio-controlled gliders that are piloted remotely from the ground with a transmitter. These can remain airborne for extended periods by using the lift produced by slopes and thermals. These can be winched into wind by a line attached to a hook under the fuselage with a ring, so that the line will drop when the model is overhead. Other methods of launching include towing aloft using a model powered aircraft, catapult-launching using an elastic bungee cord and hand-launching. When hand-launching the newer "discus" style of wing-tip hand-launching has largely supplanted the earlier "javelin" type of launch.

=== Glide bombs ===
A glide bomb is a bomb with aerodynamic surfaces to allow a gliding flightpath rather than a ballistic one. This allows the bomber aircraft to stand off from the target and launch the bomb from a safe distance. Most types have a remote control system which enables the aircraft to direct the bomb accurately to the target. Glide bombs were developed in Germany from as early as 1915. In World War II they were most successful as anti-shipping weapons. Some air forces today are equipped with gliding devices that can remotely attack airbases with a cluster bomb warhead.

== See also ==
- Flight
- Gliding flight
- Radio-controlled glider
- Unpowered aircraft
- Underwater glider
- Boomerang

	Aerostat	Aerodyne		
	Lift: Lighter than air gas	Lift: Fixed wing	Lift: Unpowered rotor	Lift: Powered rotor
Unpowered free flight	(Free) balloon	Glider	Helicopter, etc. in autorotation	(None – see note 2)
Tethered (static or towed)	Tethered balloon	Kite	Rotor kite	(None – see note 2)
Powered	Airship	Airplane, ornithopter, etc.	Autogyro	Gyrodyne, helicopter
