= Geoffrey Stephenson =

Geoffrey Stephenson may refer to:

- Geoffrey D. Stephenson, Royal Air Force officer
- Geoffrey H. Stephenson, radar engineer
