= Geoffrey H. Stephenson =

Geoffrey Leonard Huson Stephenson MBE (27 June 1911 – 29 January 2002) was a radar engineer who developed weapon-locating radar and was the first person to cross the English Channel unaided in a glider.

== Personal life ==
He was born in Ealing and educated at Ealing Grammar School, the son of William J Stephenson and Hilda M Huson. He was a member of the Quintin Boat Club and competed at the Henley Regatta in the Thames Challenge Cup (1932–1935) and the Grand Challenge Cup in 1936. He was also a keen rock climber, frequently visiting Scotland on his motorcycle. In 1948 he married Beryl Withall (née Simon) (the widow of Latham Carr Withall, a Spitfire pilot killed on 12 August 1940) and adopted her two sons (Carr and Peter). Following his retirement, he took up water colours joining the Ickenham Art Society. He died of cancer in Ickenham on 29 January 2002.

== Engineering ==
His first job was designing test equipment for valves for use in radio and television for EMI Electronics, whom he joined in 1930 at Hayes, Middlesex. Before the Second World War he was part of a team at EMI that worked on the development of radar. After the war he continued in this field and was project engineer for the mortar-locating radar, code name Green Archer. He was awarded the MBE in 1962 for his work as Chief Projects Engineer at EMI. He continued to be the dominant figure in weapon-locating radar until his retirement developing the Cymbeline system. Cymbeline was more accurate than Green Archer and more mobile. In British service, the radars were used in the Falkland Islands in 1982, the Gulf War in 1991 and in the Balkans. He is listed in patents for electric servomotor systems and for control of automatic machine tools when he worked at EMI.

== Gliding career ==
He started gliding at the London Gliding Club in 1935. Three years later, on the 22 April 1939, he was the first glider pilot to soar across the English Channel in a Slingsby Gull after having taken off from Dunstable starting at 14:55 with a very low winch launch (300 feet). The location and altitude of his starting point meant that he had to soar over a long distance to gain enough height to make the crossing. Previous crossings had relied on very high tows near the south coast. He crossed the French coast at 2,600 ft and landed in a small field by the village of Le Wast, 10 miles East of Boulogne, at 1735 hours, flying 204 km in 2hr 40min. Ann Welch and Donald Greig retrieved him by car and ferry. He held the British Silver C No. 15 which he achieved in 1937 and the British Gold C No 14. He won the British National Championships at Camphill in 1953 flying a Slingsby Sky and the 1959 Nationals at Lasham flying a Slingsby Skylark 3. He flew in three World Gliding Championships, finishing eleventh in 1952, fourteenth in 1954 and sixth in 1956. He was also an accomplished aerobatic pilot.

He continued gliding until the age of 90, flying a Schleicher ASH 25 with his stepson, Carr.

He invented the first capsule-type compensated total energy variometer, the speed-to-fly ring (often attributed to Paul MacCready) and the electric audio variometer.
