= Unpowered aircraft =

Aerial vehicle capable of sustaining flight without onboard propulsion

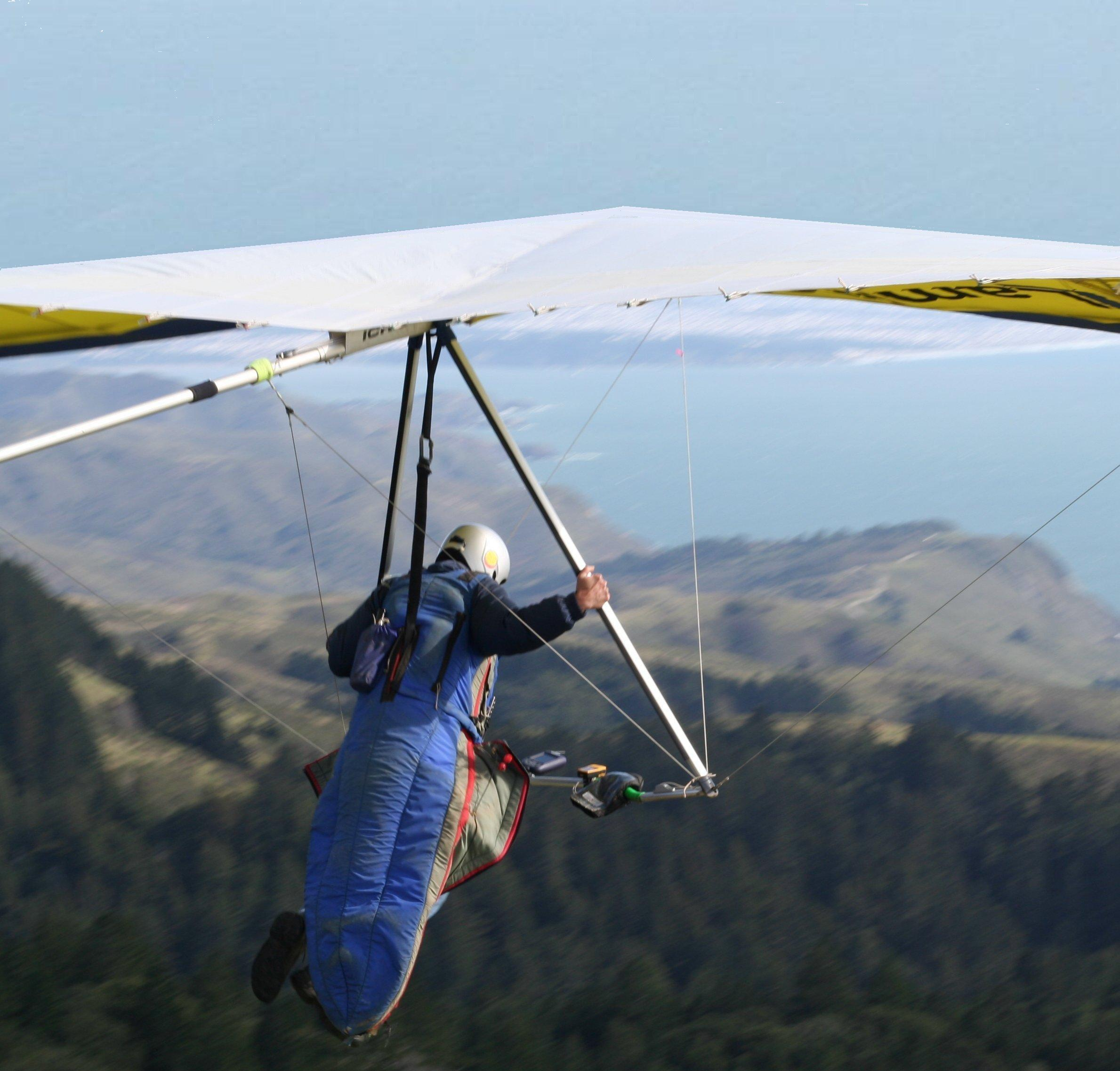
Hang glider launching from Mount Tamalpais

Unpowered aircraft is an aircraft without onboard propulsion that can remain airborne for a significant period of time. Such aircraft typically maintain unpowered flight via natural forces such as wind and updraft, or via towing by people or vehicles (e.g. a motorboat).

There are three main types of unpowered aircraft:

- Gliders, which are heavier-than-air, fixed-wing aircraft that use a forward motion in free fall to create air flow past airfoils (wings) to generate aerodynamic lift and have full directional control using various flight control surfaces. Examples of gliders include sailplanes, hang gliders and paragliders;
- Balloons, which are lighter-than-air aircraft (aerostats) that use lifting gases to displace air and create buoyancy via Archimedes' principle. The balloon may or may not be tethered, with little directional control; and
- Kites and parasails, which are tethered to the ground and lift is obtained by having natural wind or apparent wind flowing past the craft at an angle of attack, determined by the tether's point of attachment relatively to the craft's center of mass.

== History ==
The first manned aircraft were kites, balloons and gliders. Man-lifting kites were used in ancient China and Japan, often as a punishment for prisoners. Unmanned hot-air balloons and toy "bamboo-copters" are also recorded in Chinese history.

The first manned free flight was in a hot-air balloon built by the brothers Joseph-Michel and Jacques-Etienne Montgolfier in Annonay, France in 1783. The hydrogen balloon appeared at about the same time and proved more practical.

The first practical, controllable glider was designed and built by the British scientist and pioneer George Cayley who many recognise as the first aeronautical engineer. It flew in 1849.

Tethered balloons and, to a lesser extent, kites were developed for military and meteorological observation, however the use of kites has remained largely recreational. Free-flying ballooning using coal gas (which has about half the lifting effect of hydrogen) became a popular sport. Gliders were used mainly for aerodynamic research until their sporting use was developed in the 1920s.

During the two World Wars, tethered barrage balloons were made and deployed in large numbers. Military assault gliders were also developed during World War II, while the rotor kite was used by the German Navy for seaborne observation.

Modern applications include experimental high altitude wind power generation.

== Gliders ==
Sailplanes, hang gliders and paragliders are all types of glider aircraft.

For a glider to generate lift, it must first gain and then maintain sufficient forward air speed.

Launching a glider gives it the initial forward airspeed to start flying. This is often done by towing the aircraft into the air on a long line, using either a ground-based winch or vehicle, or a powered "tug" aircraft. A small foot-launched glider is launched by running downhill or stepping off a high location.

Forward speed is then maintained by a gradual descent through the surrounding air, with the wings angled slightly down so that their lift also provides a small forward thrust to counter the drag of the wing.

If the air is rising faster than the aircraft is descending through it, the glider will gain height and additional potential energy. Sources of such rising air include warm thermals and hill ridges.

In the past, unpowered military gliders have been used for military applications.

Today, the majority of use of all types of glider aircraft is recreational.

== Balloons ==
Free-flying Balloons drift with the wind. The pilot controls the altitude either by heating the air more or by releasing ballast weight. The wind direction usually changes with altitude, so crude directional control can be obtained by changing altitude.

A round tethered balloon is unstable in any significant wind. A kite balloon is streamlined to make it stable in strong winds.

Today, the majority of manned balloon flights are recreational, whereas unmanned and usually free-flying balloons are widely used for meteorological measurement.

== Kites and parasails ==
Kites are aircraft that are tethered to some other object (fixed or mobile) or other means that maintain tension in the kite line; and rely on virtual or real wind blowing over and under them to generate lift and drag. Kytoons are balloon kites that are shaped and tethered to obtain kiting deflections, and can be lighter-than-air, neutrally buoyant, or heavier-than air. Kites have been developed for commercial applications using kite control systems, including the airborne wind energy systems of high altitude wind power.

== See also ==
- Human-powered aircraft
- Unpowered flight
- Kite types
- Gliding
- Gliding competitions
- Gimli Glider, a passenger jet aircraft that ran out of fuel
- Gyroglider
- Colditz Cock, a glider built to escape from Colditz

	Aerostat	Aerodyne		
	Lift: Lighter than air gas	Lift: Fixed wing	Lift: Unpowered rotor	Lift: Powered rotor
Unpowered free flight	(Free) balloon	Glider	Helicopter, etc. in autorotation	(None – see note 2)
Tethered (static or towed)	Tethered balloon	Kite	Rotor kite	(None – see note 2)
Powered	Airship	Airplane, ornithopter, etc.	Autogyro	Gyrodyne, helicopter
