= Lift (soaring) =

Meteorological phenomenon

Lift is a meteorological phenomenon used as an energy source by soaring aircraft and soaring birds. The most common human application of lift is in sport and recreation. The three air sports that use soaring flight are: gliding, hang gliding and paragliding.

Energy can be gained by using rising air from four sources:

- Thermals (where air rises due to heat),
- Ridge lift, where air is forced upwards by a slope,
- Wave lift, where a mountain produces a standing wave,
- Convergence, where two air masses meet

In dynamic soaring it is also possible to gain energy, though this uses differences in wind speeds rather than rising air.

== Thermals ==
Example of a thermal column between the ground and a cumulus

Thermals are columns of rising air that are formed on the ground through the warming of the surface by sunlight. If the air contains enough moisture, the water will condense from the rising air and form cumulus clouds.

Thermal lift is often used by birds, such as raptors, vultures and storks. Although thermal lift was known to the Wright Brothers in 1901, it was not exploited by humans until 1921 by Wilhelm Leusch at the Wasserkuppe in Germany. It was not until about 1930 that the use of thermals for soaring in gliders became commonplace.

Once a thermal is encountered, the pilot flies in circles to keep within the thermal, so gaining altitude before flying off to the next thermal and towards the destination. This is known as "thermalling". Climb rates depend on conditions, but rates of several meters per second are common. Thermals can also be formed in a line usually because of the wind or the terrain, creating cloud streets. These can allow flying straight while climbing in continuous lift.

When the air has little moisture or when an inversion stops the warm air from rising high enough for the moisture to condense, thermals do not create cumulus clouds. Typical locations to find thermals are over towns, freshly ploughed fields and asphalt roads, but thermals are often hard to associate with any feature on the ground. Occasionally thermals are caused by the exhaust gases from power stations or by fires.

As it requires rising heated air, thermalling is only effective in mid-latitudes from spring into late summer. Despite these limitations, it is the most common source of lift used by glider pilots, as ridge lift and lee waves require mountainous terrain, and may thus not be found near a given airfield. During the off-season, when thermals are weaker, ridge and wave lift can still be used and some pilots travel to more mountainous areas to fly.

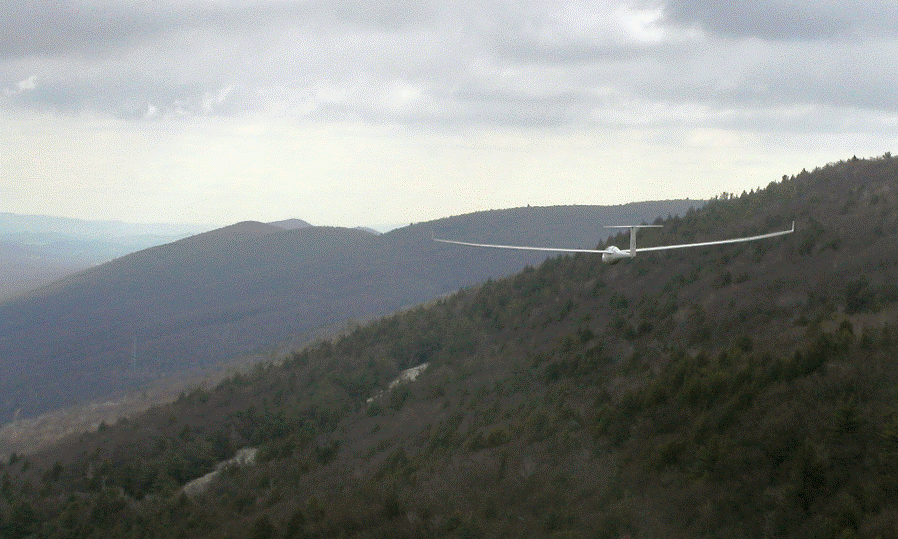
A Scimitar glider ridge soaring in Lock Haven, Pennsylvania, US

== Ridge lift ==
Ridge lift, or Orographic lift, is caused by rising air on the windward side of a slope. Ridge lift is used extensively by sea birds and by aircraft. In places where a steady wind blows, a ridge may allow virtually unlimited time aloft.

In ridge lift, pilots typically fly long straight legs parallel to the ridge. If the maximum height of the lift is not achieved, the pilot may turn around and fly in the other direction above the same slope. With winds of 20 to 25 knots (46 km/h), it is possible for aircraft to soar at an altitude up to twice the height of the obstacle. Ridge lift can also be augmented by thermals when the slopes also face the sun.

== Wave lift ==
A lenticular cloud produced by a mountain wave

Lee waves occur when a wind of 25 knots (46 km/h) blows over a mountain. Provided that there is a steady increase in wind strength with altitude without a significant change in direction, standing waves may be created. They were discovered by a glider pilot, Wolf Hirth, in 1933. These waves reach heights much greater than the original obstruction and so can permit gliders to climb to the stratosphere. Pilots use supplementary oxygen to avoid hypoxia because most gliders do not have pressurized cockpits. This lift is often marked by long, stationary lenticular (lens-shaped) clouds lying perpendicular to the wind. A mountain wave was used to set the record for highest altitude by a glider when Jim Payne and Tim Gardner soared to an altitude of 22,657 metres (74,334 ft) on September 2, 2018 over El Calafate, Argentina in the purpose-built Windward Performance Perlan II. The current world distance record of 3,008 km (1,869 statute miles) by Klaus Ohlmann (set on 21 January 2003) was also flown using mountain waves in South America.

A rare wave phenomenon is known as Morning Glory, a roll cloud producing strong lift. Pilots near Australia's Gulf of Carpentaria make use of it in springtime.

Schematic cross section through a sea breeze front. If the air inland is moist, cumulus often marks the front.

Birds have been observed using wave lift to cross mountainous regions.

== Convergence zones ==
The boundaries where two air masses meet are known as convergence zones. These can occur in sea breezes or in desert regions. A sea-breeze (or onshore breeze) is a wind from the sea that develops over land near coasts. In a sea-breeze front, cold air from the sea meets the warmer air from the land and creates a boundary like a shallow cold front along a shear line. This creates a narrow band of soarable lift with winds as light as 10 knots (19 km/h). These permit the gaining of altitude by flying along the intersection as if it were a ridge of land. Convergence may occur over considerable distances and so may permit virtually straight flight while climbing.

== Dynamic soaring ==
In dynamic soaring energy is gained by repeatedly crossing the boundary between air masses of different horizontal velocity rather than by rising air. Such zones of high "wind gradient" are usually too close to the ground to be used safely by gliders, but Albatrosses and model gliders use this phenomenon.

== Illusions of lift ==
A pilot can create an indication of lift on uncompensated instruments by entering a climb by pulling back on the stick (hence "stick thermal"). This is not true lift because the increase in potential energy of the aircraft is achieved from decreasing airspeed rather than the result of flying in rising air. Gliders are equipped with instruments that are compensated to prevent indications of stick thermals but the phenomenon is evident in aircraft whose compensation is inadequate.
