= Speed to fly =

Principle in aeronautics

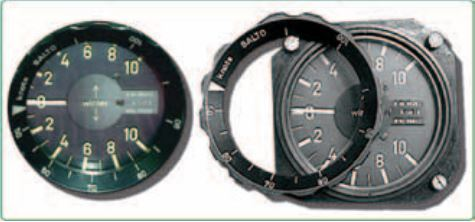
MacCready speed to fly ring for a variometer. The outer ring show various airspeeds, while the variometer shows climb rate. The index arrow, white triangle, on the ring is placed against the expected rate of climb at the next thermal. The variometer needle will then point to the optimum airspeed, listed on the ring, to be flown to that thermal. The greater the expected rate of climb, the more clockwise the ring is rotated, and the faster is the optimum airspeed.

Speed to fly is a principle used by soaring pilots when flying between sources of lift, usually thermals, ridge lift and wave. The aim is to maximize the average cross-country speed by optimizing the airspeed in both rising and sinking air. The optimal airspeed is independent of the wind speed, because the fastest average speed achievable through the airmass corresponds to the fastest achievable average groundspeed.

The speed to fly is the optimum speed through sinking or rising air mass to achieve either the furthest glide, or fastest average cross-country speed.

Most speed to fly setups use units of either airspeed in kilometers per hour (km/h) and climb rate in meters per second (m/s), or airspeed in knots (kn) and climb rate in feet per minute (ft/min).

== History ==
The first documented use of speed to fly theory was by Wolfgang Späte, who used a table of speeds to fly for different climb rates to help him win the 1938 Rhön competition flying a DFS Reiher. Späte is thought to have used a simplified form of the general theory that did not account for sinking air between thermals. In the same year two Poles, L. Swarzc and W. Kasprzyk, also published similar results, although there is some debate about whether this included the effect of air mass movement between the thermals. The simplified (no-sink) analysis was first published in English by Philip Wills in 1940, writing under the pen-name “Corunus”. The full solution incorporating sinking air between thermals was independently published in the June 1947 edition of Sailplane & Glider by two Cambridge University members, George Pirie, a graduate who had flown with Cambridge University Gliding Club, and Ernest Dewing, an undergraduate who flew at Dunstable after graduating. They both noticed, Pirie by direct argument and Dewing with mathematics, that the solution involved adding the average rate of climb in the thermal to the instantaneous rate of sink being experienced in the glide in order to find the corresponding best speed to fly. Karl Nickel and Paul MacCready published separate articles (in German) describing the same theory in Swiss Aero-Revue in 1949.

In 1954, Paul MacCready described an Optimum Airspeed Selector, that he had been using since 1947. According to MacCready, the crosscountry airspeed selector is "a simple device that indicates the optimum speed at which a sailplane should be flown between thermals. On a day with weak thermals and weak downcurrents, a pilot should fly between thermals at a velocity near that for best gliding angle of the sailplane...If the next thermal to be encountered is expected to be strong, the pilot should fly toward it at a speed higher than best-glide speed in order to reach it sooner. Note the magnitude of the wind is of no concern when considering thermals which move with the air mass. For the derivation of the airspeed selector one minimizes the time for the sailplane to reach a thermal and regain the original height."

According to Bob Wander, "The principal advantage of making a rotatable speed-to-fly ring for your total energy variometer is that cross-country speeds in gliding can be optimized when we factor the strength of thermals into the speed-to-fly process. For instance, when thermals are weak, then it pays to fly conservatively...minimum sinking speed...We are able to cruise faster between thermals when lift is strong because it is so easy to get altitude back in strong lift".

== Instrumentation ==
The minimal instrumentation required is an airspeed indicator and a variometer. The pilot will use the polar curve information for the particular glider to derive the exact speeds to fly, minimum sink or maximum L/D, depending on the lift and sink conditions in which the glider is flying. A speed to fly ring (known as a 'MacCready Ring'), which is fitted around the aircraft's variometer, will indicate the optimum airspeed to fly between thermals for maximum crosscountry performance. The ring is usually calibrated in either knots or meters per second and its markings are based on the aircraft's polar curve. During the glide between thermals, the index arrow is set at the rate of climb expected in the next thermal. On the speed ring, the variometer needle points to the optimum speed to fly between thermals.

Electronic versions of the MacCready Ring are built into glide computers that will give audible warnings to the pilot to speed up or slow down. Similar facilities can also be built into a PDA. The computer is connected to sensors that detect the aircraft's airspeed and rate of sink. If linked to a GPS, and using a computed or manual estimate of the windspeed, the glide computer can also calculate the speed and altitude necessary to glide to a particular destination. This glide is known as the final glide because no further lift should be necessary to reach the goal. During this glide, speed to fly information is needed to ensure that the remaining height is used efficiently.

== See also ==
- Geoffrey H. Stephenson
- ICAO recommendations on use of the International System of Units
