= Parker MacCready =

American oceanographer

- Born: September 19, 1959 (age 67); Pasadena, California, USA
- Relatives: Paul MacCready (father)

Academic background
- Education: BA, Architecture, 1982, Yale University; MS, Engineering Science, 1986, California Institute of Technology; PhD, Physical Oceanography, 1991, University of Washington
- Thesis: Frictional Slowing of Rotating, Stratified Flow along a Sloping Boundary (1991)

Academic work
- Institutions: University of Washington

Parker MacCready is an American oceanographer. He is a professor at the School of Oceanography at the University of Washington.

== Early life and education ==
MacCready was born and raised in Southern California to father Paul MacCready, an atmospheric scientist. Growing up in Pasadena, MacCready helped his father design the Bionic Bat and used it to break the world speed record for human-powered flight in 1984. MacCready completed his Bachelor of Science degree in architecture at Yale University and his Master of Science degree in engineering science at the California Institute of Technology. He finished his formal education with his PhD in physical oceanography from the University of Washington (UW). During his PhD, MacCready developed a new theory of the circulation of the deepest layers of the ocean.

== Career ==
Following his PhD, MacCready joined the faculty at the University of Washington as a professor of their school of oceanography. In 2014, upon returning from his stint as a visiting researcher at Microsoft Research, MacCready partnered with the organization to improve the visualization and analysis of ocean acidification modeling. Following this, he received a five-year grant from the National Oceanic and Atmospheric Administration to co-develop an early warning system for toxic harmful algal blooms in the Pacific Northwest.

During his tenure at UW, Parker and his colleagues created LiveOcean, a computer model that has the ability to predict when Washington's waters become corrosive. In 2021, MacCready was elected a Fellow of the American Geophysical Union for his work to "advance fundamental understanding of ocean coasts and estuaries, or marine environments where freshwater and saltwater mix."
