= Homer Joseph Stewart =

American aeronautical engineer (1915–2007)

- Born: August 15, 1915; Elba Township, Lapeer County, Michigan, US
- Died: May 26, 2007 (aged 91); Altadena, California, US
- Education: University of Minnesota; California Institute of Technology (Caltech)
- Scientific career
- Workplaces: California Institute of Technology
- Thesis: The effect of shear instability on the transverse circulation in the atmosphere (1940)
- Doctoral advisor: Theodore von Kármán
- Notable students: Paul MacCready; John Wilder Miles

Homer Joseph "Stewie" Stewart (August 15, 1915 – May 26, 2007) was an American aeronautical engineer, rocket propulsion expert, and Caltech professor, who pioneered the first American satellites.

== Biography ==
With a bachelor's degree from the University of Minnesota in 1936, Stewart matriculated at Caltech. Together with Theodore von Kármán, Stewart worked with rockets in San Gabriel Mountains. Their group became a "nucleus" of the Jet Propulsion Laboratory. In 1930s, Stewart and von Kármán constructed a turbine that later became known as the "Grandpa's Knob". It was built in the mountains of Vermont, "generated up to a megawatt of power and operated through World War II in cooperation with a local electrical company."

In 1938, Stewart became a Caltech faculty member; in 1940, he graduated with a Ph.D. in aeronautics. He taught aeronautics and meteorology, for many years dividing his time between teaching at Caltech and research at the Jet Propulsion Laboratory (JPL).

He was chief of JPL's liquid propulsion systems division when JPL and the Army Ballistic Missile Agency, now the Marshall Space Flight Center, developed and launched Explorer I on Jan. 31, 1958 — the first U.S. satellite to reach orbit.

In 1958 NASA (National Aeronautics and Space Administration) was formed as a response to the USSR's 1957 launch of Sputnik 1. From 1958 to 1960, Stewart took a two-year leave of absence from Caltech to serve as NASA's director of planning and evaluation. He was in charge of calculating and analyzing the exhaust velocities required to lift rockets to their planned orbits.

In addition to contributing to the development of the WAC Corporal, MGM-29 Sergeant, and Jupiter-C rockets, he helped prepare for Pioneer 4 and the preliminary planning of the Apollo Moon missions. He also recommended Cape Canaveral as a launching site. In 1959 Stewart and Wernher von Braun testified to Congress concerning the Soviet spacecraft and missile capabilities. Stewart was the chair of a committee formed to give advice on satellites to the US federal government.

Except for his two-years with NASA, Stewart remained on Caltech's faculty from 1938 until 1980, when he retired as emeritus professor of aeronautics.

In 1970 he was awarded the NASA Exceptional Service Medal. At his death, Homer J. Stewart was survived by two daughters, one son, and two grandchildren.

== Publications ==
- Stewart, H. J. (1942). "The Energy Equation for a Viscous Compressible Fluid". Proceedings of the National Academy of Sciences. 28 (5): 161–164. Bibcode:1942PNAS...28..161S. doi:10.1073/pnas.28.5.161. PMC 1078441. PMID 16588536.
- Stewart, H. J. (1942). "A Simplified Two-Dimensional Theory of Thin Airfoils". Journal of the Aeronautical Sciences. 9 (12): 452–456. doi:10.2514/8.10934.
- Puckett, A. E.; Stewart, H. J. (1947). "Aerodynamic Performance of Delta Wings at Supersonic Speeds". Journal of the Aeronautical Sciences. 14 (10): 567–578. doi:10.2514/8.1456.
- Stewart, H. J.; Li, Ting-YI (1950). "Periodic Motions of a Rectangular Wing Moving at Supersonic Speed". Journal of the Aeronautical Sciences. 17 (9): 529–539. doi:10.2514/8.1720.
- Stewart, H. J. (1956). "A Review of Source Superposition and Conical Flow Methods in Supersonic Wing Theory". Journal of the Aeronautical Sciences. 23 (5): 507–516. doi:10.2514/8.3590.
- Stewart, Homer J.; Ormsbee, Allen I. (1956). "Conical Techniques for Incompressible Nonviscous Flow" (PDF). Journal of the Aeronautical Sciences. 23 (11): 1029–1036. doi:10.2514/8.3716.
- Schriever, Bernard; Stewart, Homer Joseph; Miller, Burton F.; Sturdy, Herbert F. (1959). "Changes in Our Economy, Institutions and Human Relationships Likely to be Brought About During the Next Decade by the Scientific Breakthroughs Now Occurring". The Business Lawyer. 15 (1): 200–226. JSTOR 40683397.
- Stewart, H. J. (1966). "New Possibilities for Solar-System Exploration" (PDF). Astronautics and Aeronautics. 4 (12): 26–31.
- Stewart, H. J.; Bengelsdorf, Irving (1974). "Power from the Wind. In our search for new energy sources we might pause to consider an old one" (PDF). caltech.edu. (transcript of radio interview of Homer J. Stewart conducted by Irving Bengelsdorf)
- Stewart, H.J. (1976). "Dual optimum aerodynamic design for a conventional windmill". AIAA Journal. 14 (11): 1524–1527. Bibcode:1976AIAAJ..14.1524S. doi:10.2514/3.7248.
- Uehara, Sachio; Stewart, Homer J.; Wood, Lincoln J. (1978). "Minimum-Time Loop Maneuvers of Jet Aircraft". Journal of Aircraft. 15 (8): 449–455. doi:10.2514/3.58389.

== See also ==
- Smith–Putnam wind turbine
