= Variometer =

Flight instrument which determines the aircraft's vertical velocity

In aviation, a variometer – also known as a rate of climb and descent indicator (RCDI), rate-of-climb indicator, vertical speed indicator (VSI), or vertical velocity indicator (VVI) – is one of the flight instruments in an aircraft used to inform the pilot of the rate of descent or climb. It can be calibrated in metres per second, feet per minute (1 ft/min = 0.00508 m/s) or knots (1 kn ≈ 0.514 m/s), depending on country and type of aircraft. It is typically connected to the aircraft's external static pressure source.

In powered flight, the pilot makes frequent use of the VSI to ascertain that level flight is being maintained, especially during turning maneuvers. In gliding, the instrument is used almost continuously during normal flight, often with an audible output, to inform the pilot of rising or sinking air. It is usual for gliders to be equipped with more than one type of variometer. The simpler type does not need an external source of power and can therefore be relied upon to function regardless of whether a battery or power source has been fitted. The electronic type with audio needs a power source to be operative during the flight. The instrument is of little interest during launching and landing, with the exception of aerotow, where the pilot will usually want to avoid releasing in sink.

The vertical speed indicator from a Robinson R22. This is the most common type used in aircraft, showing vertical speed in feet per minute (ft/min).

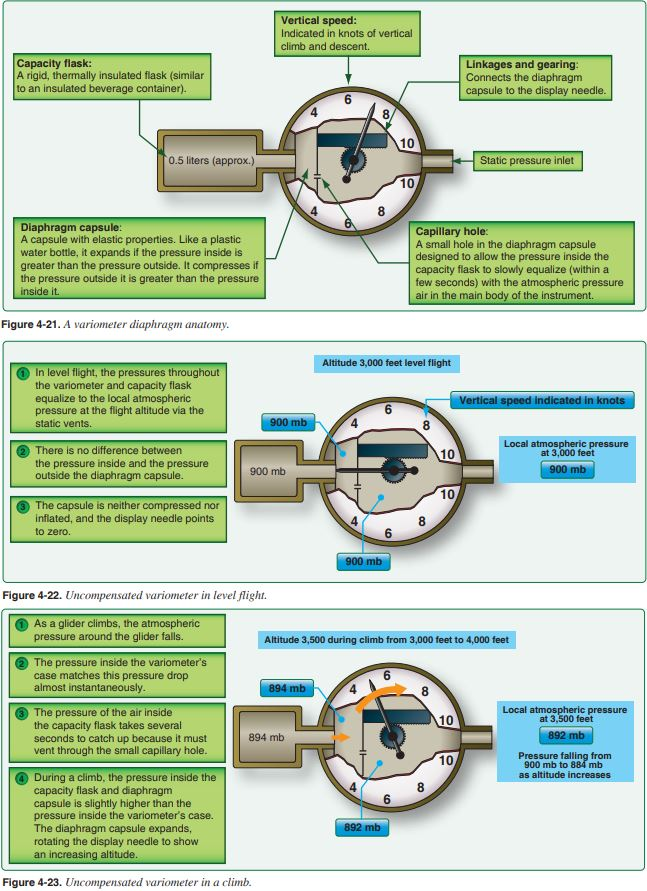
Diaphragm Variometer operation

== History ==
In 1930, according to Ann Welch, "Kronfeld...was one of the first to use a variometer, a device suggested by Alexander Lippisch." Welch goes on to state that the "first real thermal soaring" occurred in 1930 by A. Haller and Wolf Hirth, with Hirth using a variometer in his Musterle. Frank Irving states that Arthur Kantrowitz first mentioned total energy in 1940. However, as early as 1901, Wilbur Wright wrote about thermals, "when gliding operators have attained greater skill, they can, with comparative safety, maintain themselves in the air for hours at a time in this way, and thus by constant practice so increase their knowledge and skill that they can rise into the higher air and search out the currents which enable the soaring birds to transport themselves to any desired point, by first rising in a circle, and then sailing off at a descending angle."

== Description ==
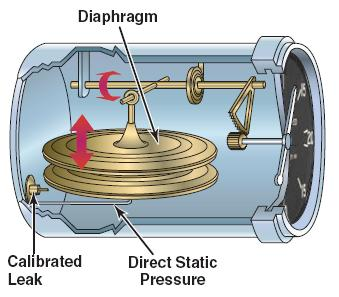
Schematic drawing of the internals of a classic aircraft vertical speed indicator

According to Paul MacCready, "A variometer is essentially a pressure altimeter with a leak which tends to make it read the altitude of a moment earlier. It consists of a container vented to the outside air in such a way that the pressure inside the flask lags slightly behind the outside static pressure. The rate of climb measurement comes from the rate-of-air inflow or outflow from the container."

Variometers measure the rate of change of altitude by detecting the change in air pressure (static pressure) as altitude changes. Common types of variometers include those based on a diaphragm, a vane (horn), a taut band, or are electric based. The vane variometer consists of a rotating vane, centered by a coil spring, dividing a chamber into two parts, one connected to a static port, and the other to an expansion chamber. Electric variometers use thermistors sensitive to airflow, or circuit boards consisting of variable resistors connected to the membrane of a tiny vacuum cavity.

A simple variometer can be constructed by adding a large reservoir (a vacuum flask) to augment the storage capacity of a common aircraft rate-of-climb instrument. In its simplest electronic form, the instrument consists of an air bottle connected to the external atmosphere through a sensitive air flow meter. As the aircraft changes altitude, the atmospheric pressure outside the aircraft changes and air flows into or out of the air bottle to equalise the pressure inside the bottle and outside the aircraft. The rate and direction of flowing air is measured by the cooling of one of two self-heating thermistors and the difference between the thermistor resistances will cause a voltage difference; this is amplified and displayed to the pilot. The faster the aircraft is ascending (or descending), the faster the air flows. Air flowing out of the bottle indicates that the altitude of the aircraft is increasing. Air flowing into the bottle indicates that the aircraft is descending.

Newer variometer designs directly measure the static pressure of the atmosphere using a pressure sensor and detect changes in altitude directly from the change in air pressure instead of by measuring air flow. These designs tend to be smaller as they do not need the air bottle. They are more reliable as there is no bottle to be affected by changes in temperature and fewer chances for leaks to occur in the connecting tubes.

The designs described above, which measure the rate of change of altitude by automatically detecting the change in static pressure as the aircraft changes altitude are referred to as "uncompensated" variometers. The term "vertical speed indicator" or "VSI" is most often used for the instrument when it is installed in a powered aircraft. The term "variometer" is most often used when the instrument is installed in a glider or sailplane.

An "Inertial-lead" or "Instantaneous" VSI (IVSI) uses accelerometers to provide a quicker response to changes in vertical speed.

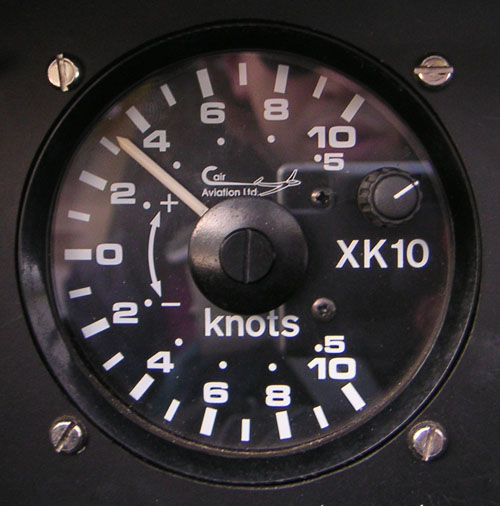
Panel mounted variometer for gliders, showing vertical speed in knots (kn).

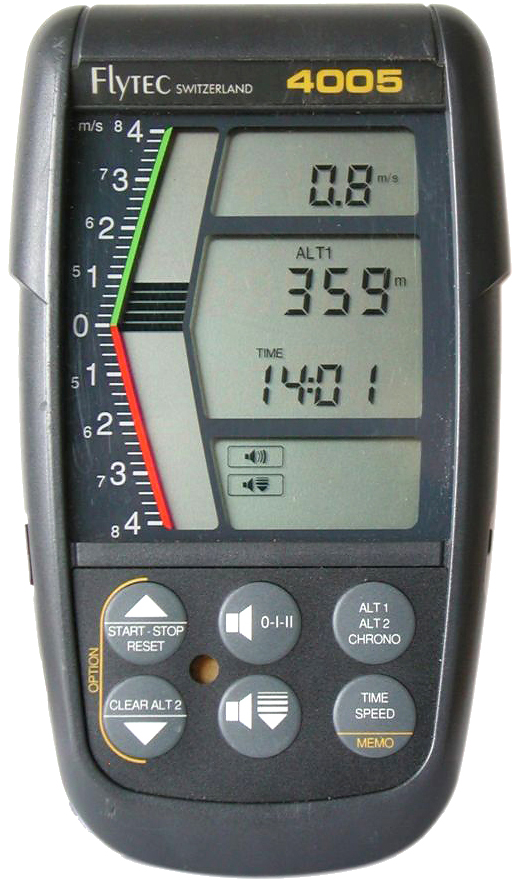
A variometer for paragliders, hang gliders, and ballooneers, showing vertical speed with both a ribbon indicator and a numeric readout, showing vertical speed in meters per second (m/s).

== Purpose ==
Human beings, unlike birds and other flying animals, are not able directly to sense climb and sink rates. Before the invention of the variometer, sailplane pilots found it very hard to soar. Although they could readily detect abrupt changes in vertical speed ("in the seat of the pants"), their senses did not allow them to distinguish lift from sink, or strong lift from weak lift. The actual climb/sink rate could not even be guessed at, unless there was some clear fixed visual reference nearby. Being near a fixed reference means being near to a hillside, or to the ground. Except when hill-soaring (exploiting the lift close to the up-wind side of a hill), these are generally very unprofitable positions for glider pilots to be in. The most useful forms of lift (thermal and wave lift) are found at higher altitudes and it is very hard for a pilot to detect or exploit them without the use of a variometer. After the variometer was invented in 1929 by Alexander Lippisch and Robert Kronfeld, the sport of gliding moved into a new realm.

Variometers also became important in foot-launch hang gliding, where the open-to-air pilot hears the wind but needs the variometer to help him or her to detect regions of rising or sinking air. In early hang gliding, variometers were not needed for the short flights or flights close to ridge lift. But the variometer became key as pilots began making longer flights. The first portable variometer for use in hang gliders was the Colver Variometer, introduced in the 1970s by Colver Soaring Instruments, which served to extend the sport into cross-country thermal flying. In the 1980s, Ball Variometers Inc., founded in 1971 by Richard Harding Ball (1921–2011), produced a wrist variometer powered by a 9-volt battery.

== Total energy compensation ==
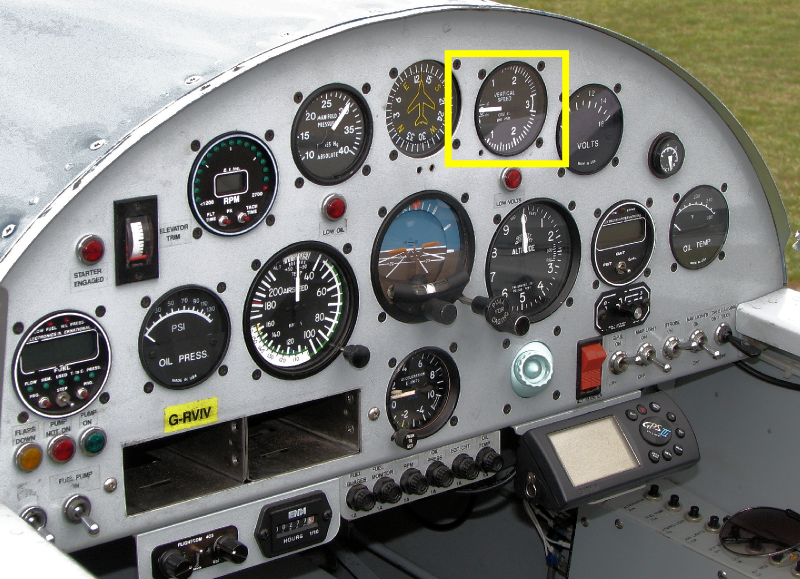
The VSI in this Van's Aircraft RV-4 light aircraft is within the yellow rectangle.

As the sport of gliding developed, however, it was found that these very simple "uncompensated" instruments had their limitations. The information that glider pilots really need to soar is the total change in energy experienced by the glider, including both altitude and speed. An uncompensated variometer will simply indicate vertical speed of the glider, giving rise to the possibility of a "stick thermal," i.e., a change in altitude caused by stick input only. If a pilot pulls back on the stick, the glider will rise, but also slow down as well. But if a glider is rising without the speed changing, this is an indication of real lift, not "stick lift."

Compensated variometers also include information about the speed of the aircraft, so the total energy (potential and kinetic) is used, not just the change in altitude. For example, if a pilot pushes forward on the stick, speeding up as the plane dives, an uncompensated variometer only indicates that altitude is being lost. But the pilot could pull back on the stick, trading the extra speed for altitude again. A compensated variometer uses both speed and altitude to indicate the change in total energy. So the pilot that pushes the stick forward, diving to gain speed, and then pulls back again to regain altitude will notice no change in total energy on a compensated variometer (neglecting energy loss due to drag).

According to Helmut Reichmann, "The word 'variometer' means literally 'change meter,' and this is how it should be understood. Without further information it remains unclear what changes are being measured. The simple variometers...are rate of climb indicators. Since the actual sailplane climb and sink displayed on these instruments depends not only on airmass movement and sailplane performance, but also in large part on angle-of-attack changes (elevator movements)...This makes it virtually impossible to extract useful information, such as - for instance - the location of thermals. While rate of climb indicators show altitude changes and hence changes in the potential energy of the sailplane, total-energy variometers indicate changes in the total energy of the sailplane, that is, both its potential energy (due to altitude) and its kinetic energy (due to airspeed)."

Most modern sailplanes are equipped with Total Energy compensated variometers.

=== Total energy compensation in theory ===
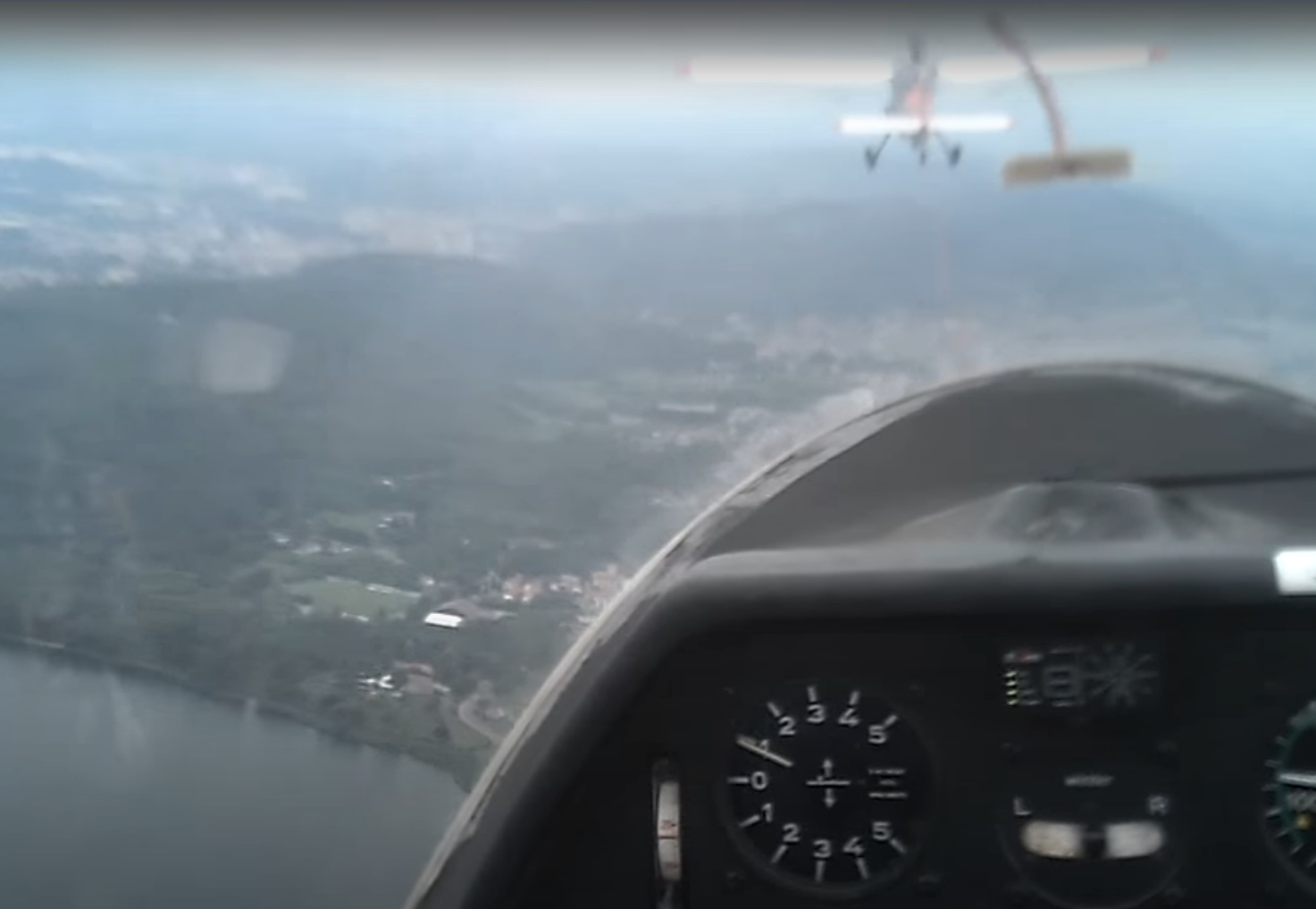
Metric variometer on a towed glider

The total energy of the aircraft is:

1. $E_\text{tot} = E_\text{pot} + E_\text{kin}$

where $E_\text{pot}$ is the potential energy, and $E_\text{kin}$ is the kinetic energy. So the change in total energy is:

2. $\Delta E_\text{tot} = \Delta E_\text{pot} + \Delta E_\text{kin}$

Since

3. Potential energy is proportional to height

$E_\text{pot} = m g h$

where $m$ is the glider mass and $g$ the acceleration of gravity

and

4. Kinetic energy is proportional to velocity squared,

$E_\text{kin} = {1 \over 2} m V^2$

then from 2:

5. $\Delta E_\text{tot} = m g \Delta h + {1 \over 2} m {\Delta V}^2$

6. Typically, this is converted to an effective altitude change by dividing by the acceleration of gravity, and the mass of the aircraft, so:

${\Delta E_\text{tot} \over m g}= \Delta h + {{\Delta V}^2 \over 2g}$

=== Total energy compensation in practice ===
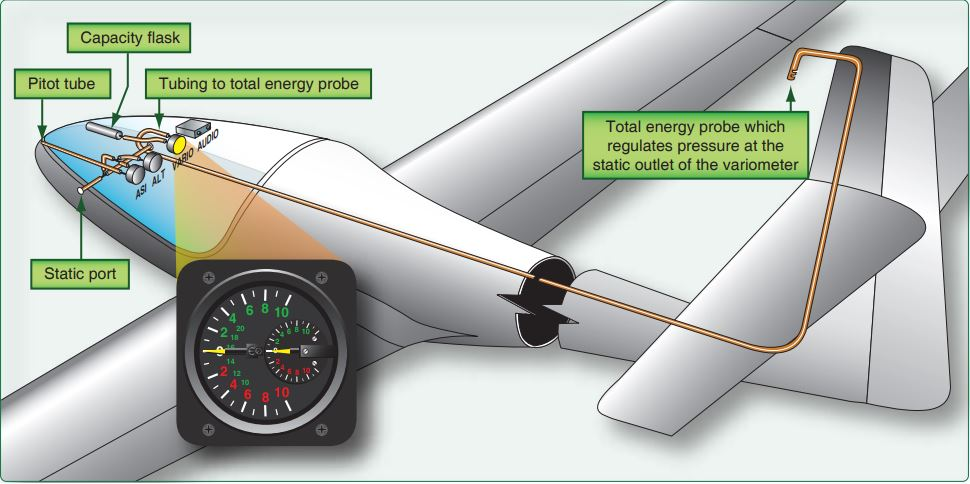
Total Energy Variometer with Braunschweig Tube

Total-Energy Variometers use a membrane compensator, compensation by venturi, or are electronically compensated. The membrane compensator is an elastic membrane, which flexes according to the total pressure (pitot plus static) from airspeed. Thus, airspeed effects cancel out an increase in sink, due to acceleration, or a decrease in sink, due to deceleration. The venturi compensator supplies a speed-dependent negative pressure, so that the pressure reduces as speed increases, compensating for the increased static pressure due to sink. According to Helmut Reichmann, "...the least sensitive venturi mounting point would appear to be on the upper quarter of the vertical fin, some 60 cm (2 feet) forward of the leading edge." Venturi compensator types include the Irving Venturi (1948), the Althaus Venturi, the Hüttner Venturi, the Brunswick Tube, the Nicks Venturi, and the Double-Slotted Tube, developed by Bardowicks of Akaflieg Hannover, also known as the Braunschweig Tube.

Very few powered aircraft have total energy variometers. Pilots of powered aircraft are more interested in the true rate of change of altitude, as they often want to hold a constant altitude or maintain a steady climb or descent.

== Netto variometer ==
A second type of compensated variometer is the Netto or airmass variometer. In addition to TE compensation, the Netto variometer adjusts for the intrinsic sink rate of the glider at a given speed (the polar curve) adjusted for the wing loading due to water ballast. The Netto variometer will always read zero in still air. This provides the pilot with the accurate measurement of air mass vertical movement critical for final glides (the last glide to the ultimate destination location).

In 1954, Paul MacCready wrote about a sinking speed correction for a total energy venturi. MacCready stated, "In still air...a glider has a different sinking speed at each airspeed...it would be nicer if the variometer automatically added the sink rate, and thus showed the vertical air motion instead of the vertical glider motion. The correction can be made by a variety of methods. Probably the nicest is to utilize the total energy venturi and the dynamic pressure from the pitot tube." As Reichmann explained, a "Netto variometer shows the climb and sink of airmass (not of the sailplane!)...In order to achieve a 'net' indication, the always present polar sink of the sailplane must be 'compensated out' of the indication. To do this, one makes use of the fact that above the speed for best glide the polar sink speed of the sailplane increases roughly with the square of the airspeed. Since the pitot pressure also increases with the square of the speed, one can use it to 'compensate away' the effect of sailplane polar sink over virtually the entire speed range." Tom Brandes states, "Netto is simply the German way of saying 'net,' and a Netto Variometer System (or polar compensator) is simply one that tells you the net vertical air movement with the sailplane movement or sink taken out of the usual variometer reading."

The Relative Netto Variometer indicates the vertical speed the glider would achieve IF it flies at thermalling speed - independent of current air speed and attitude. This reading is calculated as the Netto reading minus the glider's minimum sink. When the glider circles to thermal, the pilot needs to know the glider's vertical speed instead of that of the air mass. The Relative Netto Variometer (or sometimes the super Netto) includes a g-sensor to detect thermalling. When thermalling, the sensor will detect acceleration (gravity plus centrifugal) above 1 g and tell the relative netto variometer to stop subtracting the sailplane's wing load-adjusted polar sink rate for the duration. Some earlier nettos used a manual switch instead of the g sensor.

== Electronic variometers ==
In 1954, MacCready pointed out the advantages of an Audio Variometer, "There is much to be gained if the variometer indication is presented to the pilot by sound. More than any other instrument except during blind flying, the variometer must be watched continuously. if the pilot can get the reading by ear, he can improve his thermal flying by watching nearby gliders, and he can materially improve the overall flight by studying the cloud formations to be used next."

In modern gliders, most electronic variometers generate a sound whose pitch and rhythm depends on the instrument reading, an example of sonification. Typically the audio tone increases in frequency as the variometer shows a higher rate of climb and decreases in frequency towards a deep groan as the variometer shows a faster rate of descent. When the variometer is showing a climb, the tone is often chopped and the rate of chopping may be increased as the climb rate increases, while during a descent the tone is not chopped. The vario is typically silent in still air or in lift which is weaker than the typical sink rate of the glider at minimum sink. This audio signal allows the pilot to concentrate on the external view instead of having to watch the instruments, thus improving safety and also giving the pilot more opportunity to search for promising looking clouds and other signs of lift. A variometer that produces this type of audible tone is known as an "audio variometer".

Advanced electronic variometers in gliders can present other information to the pilot from GPS receivers. The display can thus show the bearing, distance and height required to reach an objective. In cruise mode (used in straight flight), the vario can also give an audible indication of the correct speed to fly depending on whether the air is rising or sinking. The pilot merely has to input the estimated MacCready setting, which is the expected rate of climb in the next acceptable thermal.

There is an increasing trend for advanced variometers in gliders towards flight computers (with variometer indications) which can also present information such as controlled airspace, lists of turnpoints and even collision warnings. Some will also store positional GPS data during the flight for later analysis.

== Radio controlled soaring ==
Variometers are also used in radio controlled gliders. Each variometer system consists of a radio transmitter in the glider, and a receiver on the ground for use by the pilot. Depending on the design, the receiver may give the pilot the current altitude of the glider, and a display that indicates if the glider is gaining or losing altitude—often via an audio tone. Other forms of telemetry may also be provided by the system, displaying parameters such as airspeed and battery voltage. Variometers used in radio controlled gliders may or may not feature total energy compensation.

Variometers are not essential in radio controlled gliders; a skilled pilot can usually determine if the glider is going up or down via visual cues alone. The use of variometers is prohibited in some soaring contests for radio controlled gliders.

== See also ==
- Primary flight display
- ICAO recommendations on use of the International System of Units
- Hang gliding
- Paragliding
- Speed to fly
