= Stick thermal =

In aviation, and particularly in the sport of gliding, a stick thermal is an illusion that the glider is climbing in a thermal when, in fact, the upward movement of the glider is caused by nothing more than the pilot pulling backwards on the control stick, causing the aircraft to climb, but lose airspeed.

== Background ==
It is useful for a pilot to know the rate of climb of air in a thermal. They can use this to find the strongest area of lift in the thermal. A variometer can be used to measure the rate of ascent of an aircraft. However, a simple variometer does not actually measure the lift in the thermal, it measures the rate of ascent of the aircraft. So a pilot may be inside a thermal that is moving upwards at 2 metres per second, but the pilot may be diving their aircraft at 2 metres per second. So the variometer shows zero rate of climb, and does not indicate the presence of the thermal.

A total energy compensated variometer will show the actual rate of climb of the thermal, regardless of the movement of the aircraft.
