= Wilhelm Leusch =

German fighter pilot

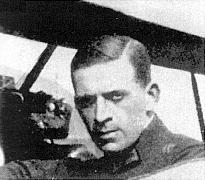
- Leusch in his plane
- Born: 15 October 1892; Neuss, Düsseldorf, Germany
- Died: 14 August 1921 (aged 28)
- Military career
- Allegiance: Germany
- Branch: Flying service
- Rank: Leutnant
- Units: Feldflieger Abteilung 19; Jagdstaffel 13; Jagdstaffel 19
- Commands: Jagdstaffel 19
- Awards: Iron Cross

Leutnant Wilhelm Leusch (15 October 1892 – 14 August 1921) was a German World War I flying ace credited with five aerial victories.

== Biography ==
Wilhelm Leusch was born on 15 October 1892 in Neuss, a suburb of Düsseldorf.

He enlisted in the Imperial German Air Service on 5 October 1914. After training, he was posted to the defense of Metz in early 1915. Later in 1915, he was assigned to Feldflieger Abteilung 19. He was commissioned as an officer in 1916, and was transferred to a fighter squadron, Jagdstaffel 13 on 1 November. In April 1917, he was transferred again, this time to Jagdstaffel 19. He scored his first aerial victory while flying with them, shooting down a SPAD on 12 May 1917.

Leusch would not score another aerial victory for more than a year. Then, on 17 June 1918, he shot down a French SPAD from Escadrille 3. On 6 October, he shot down an American observation balloon. On the 18th, he was appointed to the command of his squadron; though not yet an ace, his long service had earned him both classes of the Iron Cross. He would go on to shoot down a SPAD S.13 on 26 October, and a Breguet 14 on 3 November, to become an ace.

Having survived four years of war, Wilhelm Leusch died in a peacetime glider accident on 14 August 1921.
