= List of soaring birds =

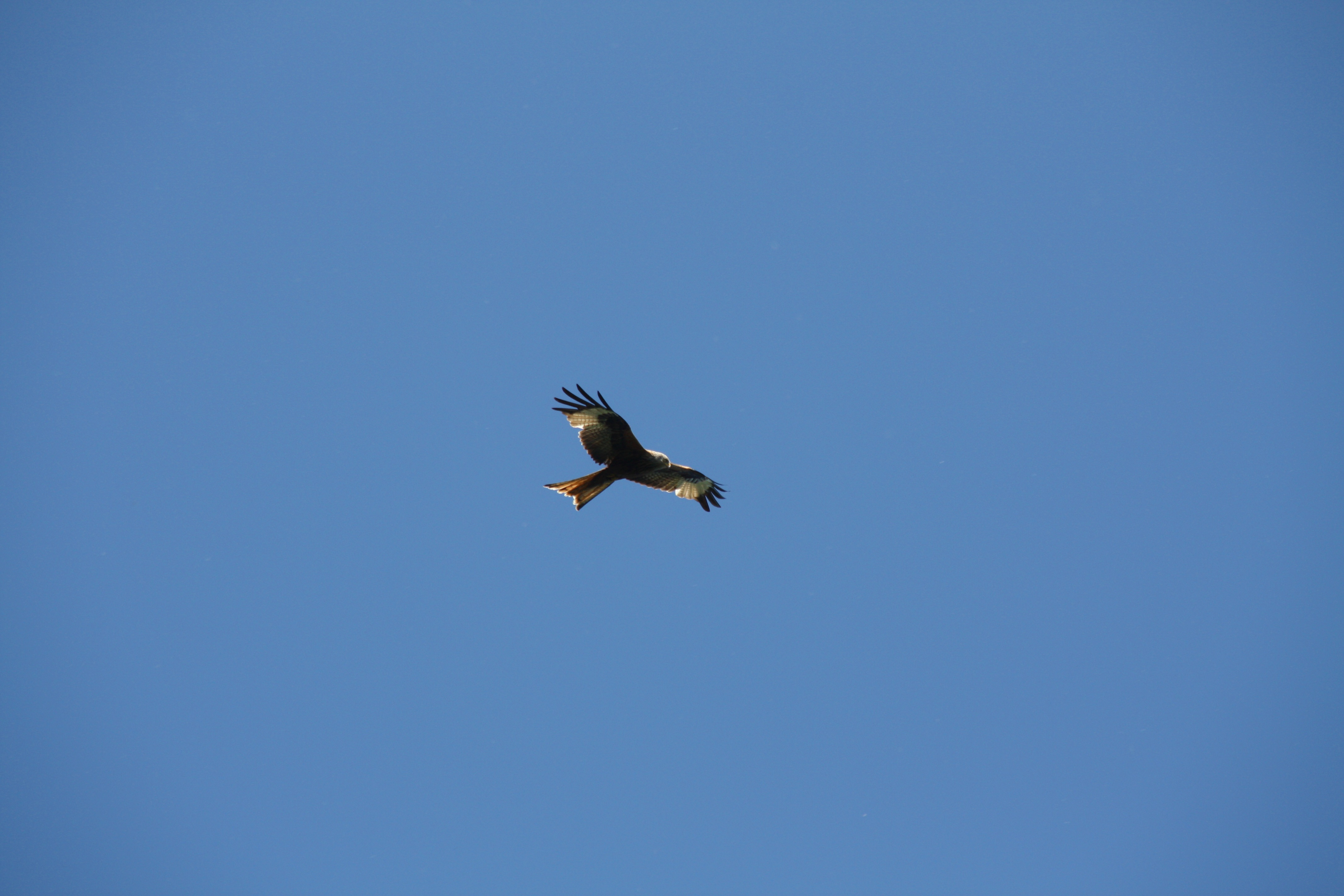
The red kite soaring.

This is a list of soaring birds, which are birds that can maintain flight without wing flapping, using rising air currents. Many gliding birds are able to "lock" their extended wings by means of a specialized tendon.

Bird of prey

- Buzzards
- Condors
- Eagles
- Falcons
- Harriers
- Hawks
- Kites
- Osprey
- Secretary bird
- Vultures

Passerine

- Choughs
- Raven
- Woodswallows

Cranes

- Sandhill

Herons

Storks

Ibises

Sea birds

- Albatrosses
- Frigatebirds
- Gulls
- Pelicans
- Petrels
- Shearwaters
- Terns

Extinct

- Argentavis

== See also ==
- Flying and gliding animals
- Shearwaters which use a similar technique
