= Polikarpov BDP S-1 =

Military glider of the Soviet Union

The BDP S-1 (Boyevoi Desantnyi Planer – troops assault glider) was a military glider of the Soviet Union. It was produced by the Bureau of Special Construction (Osoboe Konstruktorskoe Buro) in 1941 as a glider infantry troop transport. It accommodated 20 troops plus one pilot, and had gun ports for defense. Of wooden construction, the glider featured a high aspect ratio, high-cantilever wing and trailing flaps, utilizing a wheeled-carriage for takeoff and landing on plywood runners Due to the advance of German forces, only seven were built until the factory was moved, and production was shifted to powered aircraft.

== Technical data ==
- Type: Battle glider
- Crew: Pilot
- Payload: 20 soldiers, equipped, or equivalent weight in other cargo.
- Towing speed: 100 mph (maximum)
- Wingspan: 65.7 ft
- Wing area: 481 sq ft
- Empty: 5,070 lb
- Cargo: 2,630 1b
- Total with cargo: 7,700 lb
- Maximum airspeed: 100 mph
