= Atair Insect =

Paraglider

The Atair Insect is a powered paraglider in the mode of unmanned aerial vehicle (UAV) by Atair Aerospace Inc.

The company showcased its LEAPP technology in 2006 at the Association of the United States Army (AUSA) Annual Meeting and Exposition.

== Design ==
The Atair Insect uses a parafoil for its kited wing, an evolution of Domina Jalbert's invention. LEAPP is a trademark for "Long Endurance Autonomous Powered Paraglider". The Atair Insect is a Type II LEAPP UAV within Atair Aerospace's designation scheme. LEAPP (Type I) and LEAPP (Type III) are associated powered paraglider products.

When the engine is off, the system is a paraglider. The Atair Insect may be sized to fit applications. Altair Aerospace's other powered paraglider UAVs are the Atair Micro LEAPP and Atair LEAPP.
