= Paul MacCready =

American aeronautical engineer (1925–2007)

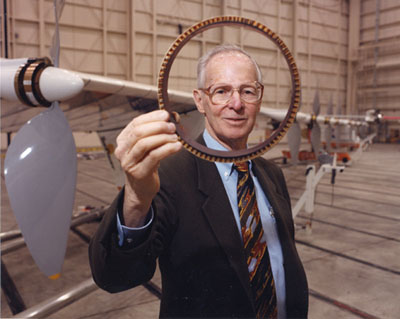
- MacCready shows a cross section of the Helios Prototype wing spar.
- Born: Paul Beattie MacCready Jr. September 29, 1925; New Haven, Connecticut, U.S.
- Died: August 28, 2007 (aged 81); Pasadena, California, U.S.
- Education: Yale University (BS); Caltech (MS, PhD)
- Engineering career
- Projects: AeroVironment

Paul Beattie MacCready Jr. (September 25, 1925 – August 28, 2007) was an American aeronautical engineer. He was the founder of AeroVironment and the designer of the human-powered aircraft that won the first Kremer prize. He devoted his life to developing more efficient transportation vehicles that could "do more with less".

== Early life and education ==
Born in New Haven, Connecticut, to a medical family, MacCready was an inventor from an early age and won a national contest building a model flying machine at the age of 15. "I was always the smallest kid in the class ... by a good bit, and was not especially coordinated, and certainly not the athlete type, who enjoyed running around outside, and was socially kind of immature, not the comfortable leader, teenager type. And so, when I began getting into model airplanes, and getting into contests and creating new things, I probably got more psychological benefit from that than I would have from some of the other typical school things."

MacCready graduated from Hopkins School in 1943 and then trained as a US Navy pilot before the end of World War II. He received a BS in physics from Yale University in 1947, an MS in physics from Caltech in 1948, and a PhD in aeronautics from Caltech in 1952. His doctoral dissertation Investigation of Atmospheric Turbulence was supervised by Homer Joseph Stewart. In 1951, MacCready founded his first company, Meteorology Research Inc, to do atmospheric research. Some of MacCready's work as a graduate student involved cloud seeding, and he was an early pioneer of the use of aircraft to study meteorological phenomena.

== Career and achievements ==
He started gliding after World War II and was a three-time winner (1948, 1949, 1953) of the Richard C. du Pont Memorial Trophy, awarded annually to the U.S. National Open Class Soaring Champion. In 1956, he became the first American pilot to become the World Soaring Champion in the World Championships at St Yan in France.

He invented a device that told pilots the best speed to fly a glider, based on the predicted rate of climb in the next thermal and the glider's rate of sink at different air-speeds. Sailplane pilots still use the "MacCready speed ring", on their rate-of-climb instrument to optimize their flying speed between areas of "lift".

In the 1970s, he guaranteed a business loan for a friend, which subsequently failed, leaving him with a $100,000 debt. This was the motivation he needed to compete for the £50,000 Kremer prize for human-powered flight, which had been on offer for 18 years. With Dr. Peter B.S. Lissaman, he created a human-powered aircraft, the Gossamer Condor. The Condor stayed aloft for seven minutes while it completed the required figure eight course, thereby winning the first Kremer prize in August 1977. The award-winning plane was constructed of aluminium tubing, plastic foam, piano wire, bicycle parts, and mylar foil for covering.

Kremer then offered another £100,000 for the first human-powered crossing of the English Channel. MacCready took up the challenge and in 1979, he built the Condor's successor, the Gossamer Albatross, and won the second Kremer prize, flown by Bryan Allen (a pilot and athlete who could pedal better than most pilots) from England to France. He also received the Collier Trophy, which is awarded annually for the greatest achievement in aeronautics or astronautics, for his design and construction of the Albatross.

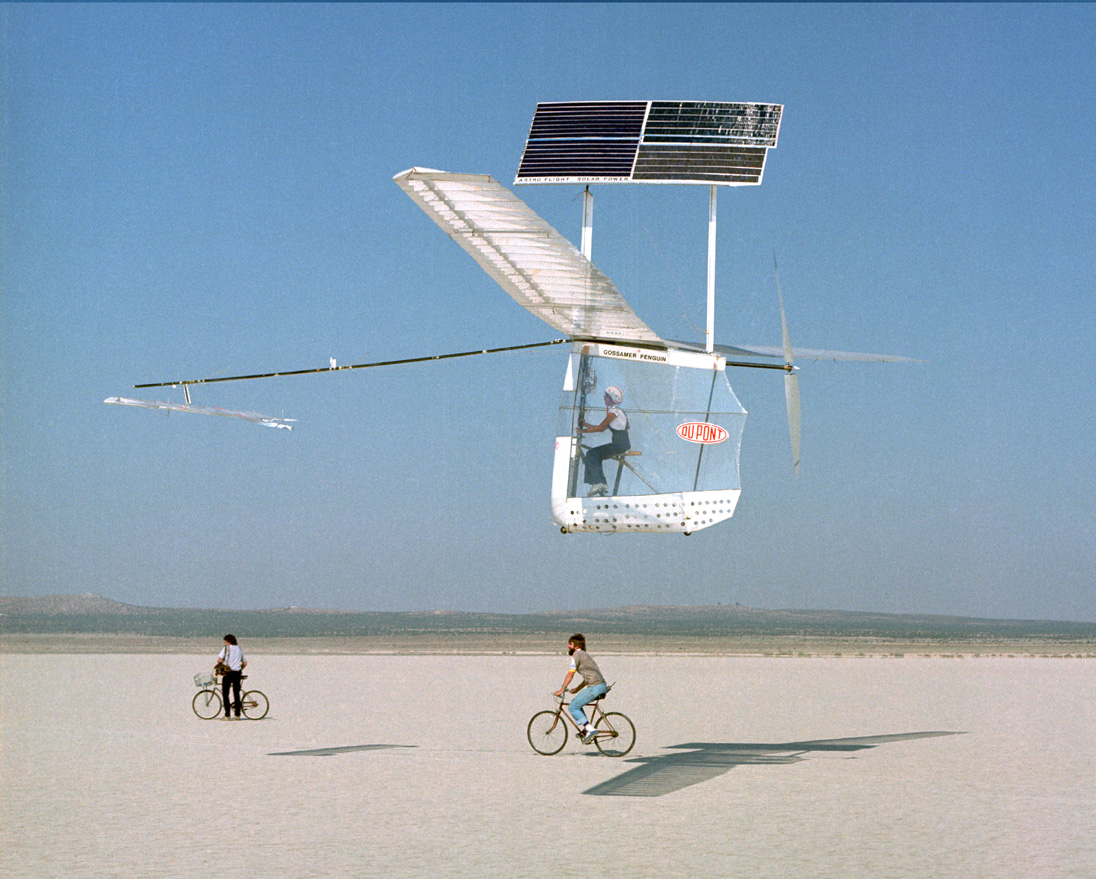
The Gossamer Penguin in flight

He later created solar-powered aircraft such as the Gossamer Penguin and the Solar Challenger. He was involved in the development of NASA's solar-powered flying wings such as the Helios, which surpassed the SR-71's altitude records and could theoretically fly on Mars (where the atmosphere is thin, with little oxygen). MacCready also collaborated with General Motors on the design of the Sunraycer, a solar-powered car, and then on the EV1 electric car.

In 1985, he was commissioned to build a halfscale working replica of the pterosaur Quetzalcoatlus for the Smithsonian Institution, following a workshop in 1984, which concluded that such a replica was feasible. The completed remote-controlled flying reptile, with a wingspan of 18 feet, was filmed over Death Valley, California in 1986 for the Smithsonian's IMAX film On the Wing. It flew successfully several times before being severely damaged in a crash at an airshow at Andrews AFB in Maryland. The launch of the pterosaur model came off well but the radio transmitter link failed, perhaps because of the interference from some of the many base communications devices. The model nosed over and crashed at the runway side, breaking at the neck from the force of impact.

MacCready helped to sponsor the Nissan Dempsey/MacCready Prize which has helped to motivate developments in racing-bicycle technology, applying aerodynamics and new materials to allow for faster human-powered vehicles.

He was the founder (in 1971) and Chairman of AeroVironment Inc., a public company (AVAV) that develops unmanned surveillance aircraft and advanced power systems. AV flew a prototype of the first airplane to be powered by hydrogen fuel cells, the Global Observer.

MacCready died on August 28, 2007, from metastatic melanoma. He was an atheist and a skeptic. He was survived by his wife, Judy, his three sons, Parker, Tyler, and Marshall, and two grandchildren.

== Awards and honors ==
- Induction to the U.S. Soaring Hall of Fame, 1954
- Otto Lilienthal Medal of the Fédération Aéronautique Internationale, 1956 ("for his decisive victory in earning the title of World Soaring Champion in 1956")
- California Institute of Technology, Distinguished Alumni Award, 1978,
- Collier Trophy, 1979, by the National Aeronautics Association
- Reed Aeronautical Award, 1979, by the American Institute of Aeronautics and Astronautics ("the most notable achievement in the field of aeronautical science and engineering")
- Edward Longstreth Medal, 1979, by the Franklin Institute
- Engineer of the Century Gold Medal, 1980, by the American Society of Mechanical Engineers
- Spirit of St. Louis Medal, 1980
- Inventor of the Year Award, 1981, by the Association for the Advancement of Invention and Innovation
- Klemperer Award, 1981, Organisation Scientifique et Technique du Vol à Voile, Paderborn, Germany
- I.B. Laskowitz Award, 1981, New York Academy of Science
- The Lindbergh Award, 1982, by the Lindbergh Foundation ("to a person who contributes significantly to achieving a balance between technology and the environment")
- Golden Plate Award, 1982, of the American Academy of Achievement
- Gold Air Medal, of the Fédération Aéronautique Internationale
- Distinguished Service Award, of the Federal Aviation Administration
- Honorary Doctor of Engineering from Stevens Institute of Technology, 1980
- Member of the American Academy of Arts and Sciences, 1981
- Honorary Doctor of Science from Yale University, 1983
- Award for Outstanding Contribution to the Advance of Applied Meteorology, 1985, American Meteorological Society
- Public Service Grand Achievement Award, of NASA
- Frontiers of Science and Technology Award, 1986, first award in this category given by the Committee for the Scientific Investigation of Claims of the Paranormal
- The "Lipper Award", 1986, for outstanding contribution to creativity, by the O-M Association (Odyssey of the Mind)
- Guggenheim Medal, 1987, jointly by the American Institute of Aeronautics and Astronautics, the Society of Automotive Engineers, and the American Society of Mechanical Engineers
- National Air and Space Museum Trophy for Current Achievement, 1988
- Enshrinement in The National Aviation Hall of Fame, July 1991, Dayton, Ohio
- SAE Edward N. Cole Award for Automotive Engineering Innovation, September 1991
- Scientist of the Year, 1992 ARCS (Achievement Rewards for College Scientists), San Diego Chapter
- Pioneer of Invention, 1992, United Inventors Association
- Chrysler Design Award for Innovation in Design, 1993
- Honorary Member designation, American Meteorological Society, 1995
- American Society of Mechanical Engineers, Ralph Coats Roe Medal, November 1998
- Howard Hughes Memorial Award, Aero Club of Southern California, January 1999
- Calstart's 1998 Blue Sky Merit Award, February 1999
- 1999 National Convention of the Soaring Society of America, dedicated to Paul MacCready, February 1999
- Special Achievement Award, Design News, March 1999
- Included in Time magazine's "The Century's Greatest Minds" (March 29, 1999) series "on the 100 most influential people of the century"
- Philip J. Klass Lifetime Achievement Aviation Week Laureate Award, April 1999
- Commemorated in Palau stamp, 1 of 16 "Environmental Heroes of the 20th Century", January 2000
- Institute for the Advancement of Engineering William B. Johnson Memorial Award, February 2000
- Cooper-Hewitt, National Design Museum, National Design Award – Product Design, November 2000
- Hoyt Clarke Hottel Award, American Solar Energy Society, April 24, 2001 ("lifetime achievement as an inventor, specifically for inventing the world's first two solar-powered aircraft")
- 2001 World Technology Award for Energy, England, July 2001
- Prince Alvaro de Orleans Borbon Fund, First Annual Award, October 2001, from the Fédération Aéronautique Internationale, Switzerland
- The 2002 Walker Prize, Museum of Science, Boston, March 2002
- International von Karman Wings Award, Aerospace Historical Society, May 2002
- Member of the American Philosophical Society, 2002
- The 9th Annual Heinz Award in Technology, the Economy and Employment, 2003
- Bower Award and Prize for Achievement in Science, 2003
- Honorary Doctorate, Washington & Jefferson College, May 2007
- Included in the Pantheon of Skeptics of the Committee for Skeptical Inquiry (Formerly Committee for the Scientific Investigation of Claims of the Paranormal)(April 2011)
- Included in Flying magazine's list of the "51 Heroes of Aviation" (July 24, 2013)
- Inducted into National Inventors Hall of Fame, 2015

== Other interests ==
MacCready was a secular humanist, which he defined as someone who "does not believe in God, and doesn't steal." He was a laureate of the International Academy of Humanism.

He was involved with scientific skepticism from its early days, being a member of the board of directors of the Southern California Skeptics in 1985. Skeptic and author Michael Shermer credits MacCready with his introduction to the skeptical movement. MacCready was admitted posthumously to the Committee for Skeptical Inquiry's Pantheon of Skeptics in 2011.

Since 2013, MacCready has been listed on the Advisory Council of the National Center for Science Education.

MacCready was also a passionate environmentalist who was concerned about humanity's role in the depletion of natural resources. "Environmentally conscious, technologically clever, and culturally grand, Paul wanted to change the world through reason, intelligence, and creativity", Shermer wrote of him in an obituary.

== Appearances ==
MacCready lectured widely at both industry and educational venues, with an emphasis on creativity. Enthusiastic about spreading his message to as many as possible, he would speak to anyone he thought he could influence, including children. Michael Shermer described his delivery as "completely unpretentious, conversing in the same manner whether he was talking to a room full of undergraduate students or Nobel laureates and Pulitzer Prize winners." In February 1998, MacCready spoke at a TED conference on the topic of nature versus humans, continuing his environmental theme of "doing more with less". In February 2003 he delivered another TED talk entitled "A Flight on Solar Wings".

== Publications ==
- Paul MacCready (November 1985), "The Great Pterodactyl Project" (PDF), Engineering & Science: 18–24
- Paul MacCready (1995), Unleashing Creativity, A keynote presentation at the Lemelson Center's symposium, "The Inventor and the Innovative Society," November 10, 1995, archived from the original on October 20, 2010
