= Thermal =

Column of rising air in the lower altitudes of Earth's atmosphere

Example of a thermal column between the ground and a cumulus

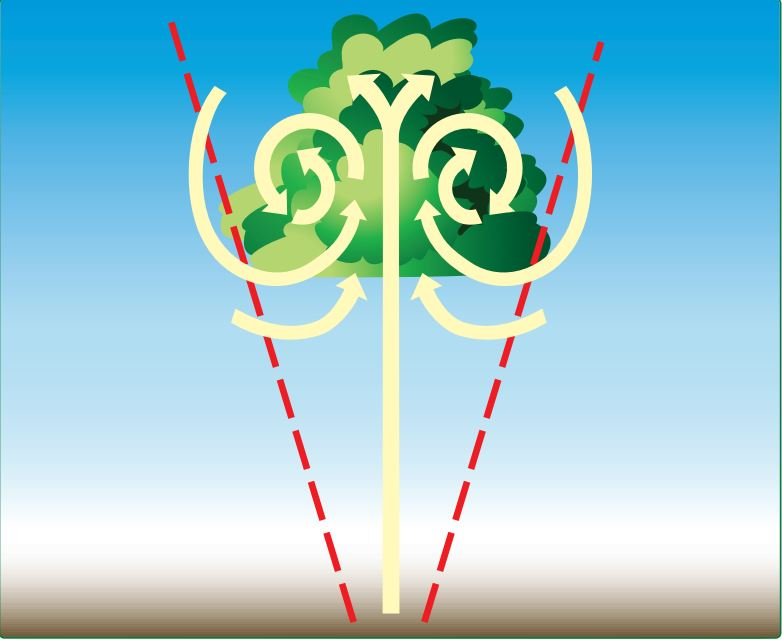
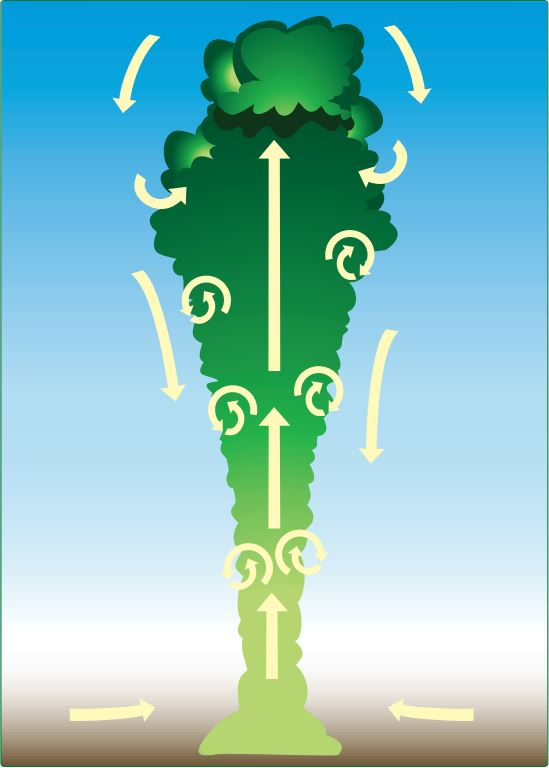
Bubble or vortex ring thermal model (left), and column or plume thermal model (right)

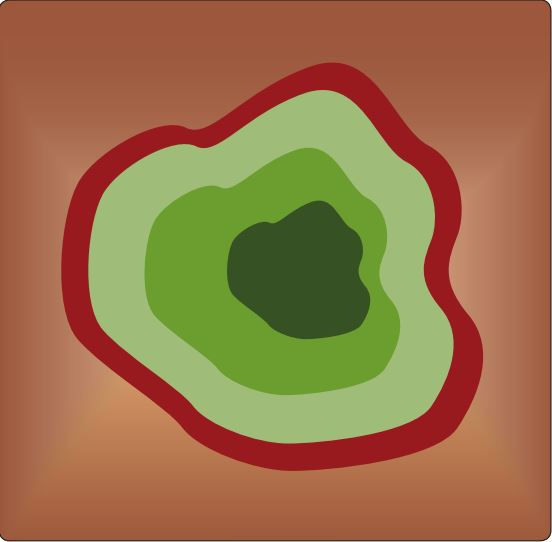
Thermal cross section with stronger lift (rising air) in darker shades of green, while red is sink (descending air).

A thermal column (or thermal) is a rising mass of buoyant air, a convective current in the atmosphere, that transfers heat energy vertically. Thermals are created by the uneven heating of Earth's surface from solar radiation, and are an example of convection, specifically atmospheric convection.

== Thermals on Earth ==
The Sun warms the ground, which in turn warms the air directly above. The warm air near the surface expands, becoming less dense than the surrounding air. The lighter air rises and cools due to its expansion in the lower pressure at higher altitudes. It stops rising when it has cooled to the same temperature, thus density, as the surrounding air.

Associated with a thermal is a downward flow surrounding the thermal column. The downward-moving exterior is caused by colder air being displaced at the top of the thermal.

The size and strength of thermals are influenced by the properties of the lower atmosphere (the troposphere). When the air is cold, bubbles of warm air are formed by the ground heating the air above it and can rise like a hot air balloon. The air is then referred to as unstable, as it's suitable for forming thermals. If there is a warm layer of air higher up, an inversion can prevent thermals from rising high and the air is said to be stable, as mature thermals can't form.

Thermals are often indicated by the presence of visible isolated cumulus clouds at the top of the thermal. Cumulus clouds are formed by the rising air in a thermal as it ascends and cools, until the water vapor in the air begins to condense into visible droplets. When a steady wind is present, thermals and their respective cumulus clouds can align in rows oriented with wind direction, sometimes referred to as "cloud streets" by soaring and glider pilots.

The condensing water releases latent heat energy allowing the air to rise higher. Very unstable air can reach the level of free convection (LFC), rising to great heights, condensing large quantities of water and forming convective clouds causing showers or even thunderstorms. The latter are dangerous to any aircraft flying through or nearby.

Thermals are one of the many sources of lift used by soaring birds and gliders to soar.

== Thermals beyond Earth ==
Thermals are also seen elsewhere in the Solar System. On Mars, for example, thermals are often seen in the form of dust devils, carrying dust instead of water vapor. Thermals are also seen on the Sun, typically forming hexagonal convective prisms (Bénard cells).

== See also ==
- Air current
- Atmospheric thermodynamics
- Cumulus cloud
- Gliding
  - Hang gliding
- Thermal energy
