= South African Hang Gliding and Paragliding Association =

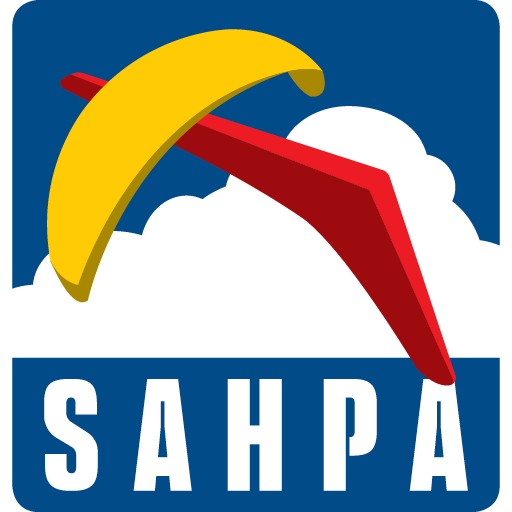
SAHPA logo

The South African Hang Gliding and Paragliding Association (SAHPA) is a membership-based organisation which represents the interests of pilots partaking in Paragliding, Hang-Gliding and related air-sports.

All pilots that part take in these sports must be licensed by the South African Civil Aviation Authority (SACAA), as required by the Civil Aviation Act.

SAHPA is also a section of the Aero Club of South Africa, therefore SAHPA members are also required to be Aero Club Members.

== Scope ==
SAHPA focuses on the following sports:

- paragliding
- hang gliding
- powered paragliding
- powered hang gliding
- and para-trikes.

== Mandate ==
SAHPA has been mandated by the South African Civil Aviation Authority (see “South African Civil Aviation Regulations, 2011, as amended, Regulation 149.01.1) to:

- To oversee and develop the safe operation of its members and continuously evaluate compliance with the condition of its approved MOP, the SACAR and standards as determined by RAASA
- To advise CAASA on regulatory amendments applicable to its operation
- To notify CAASA of any-non-compliance by its members of its MOP
- Approval subject to regular review and audits as required by CAASA from time to time”

All pilots that take part in these sports in South Africa must do so with a valid pilot licence. Foreign pilots may obtain a Foreign Pilot Permit from SAHPA by providing their IPPI Card for validation.

== Site Guide ==
The SAHPA Site Guide is an ongoing project supported by volunteers who contribute their insight and experience. It is based on, and includes original content from Greg Hamerton’s Fresh Air Site Guide (5th edition, 2006).

== See also ==
- Sport in South Africa
