= National Aeronautic Association =

Aviation club in the United States

- Abbreviation: NAA
- Formation: 1905; 121 years ago
- Type: Not for profit
- Location: Washington, D.C., U.S.
- Chairman: James Albaugh
- President: Greg Principato
- Website: naa.aero

The National Aeronautic Association (NAA) of the United States is a non-profit 501(c)(3) organization and a founding member of the Fédération Aéronautique Internationale (FAI). Founded in 1905, it is the oldest national aviation club in the United States and one of the oldest in the world, it serves as the "Aeroclub of the United States" and, by its Mission Statement it is "...dedicated to the advancement of the art, sport and science of aviation in the United States". The NAA is headquartered at Ronald Reagan Washington National Airport in Washington, D.C.

== History ==
The NAA was founded in 1905, as the Aero Club of America (ACA), by members of the Automobile Club of America. From its inception, ACA's goal was to promote aviation in any way possible, as both a sport and a commercial endeavor. In 1922, it was incorporated as the Aero Club's successor, and continued the original group's mission of promoting aviation. The NAA has been steeply involved with the growth of aviation in the United States almost since its beginning, to the point of being the sole issuer of pilot licenses in American until the Civil Aeronautics Act of 1926. The Chairman of the NAA is James Albaugh. The President and Chief Executive Officer of the NAA is Greg Principato.

== The NAA and the Fédération Aéronautique Internationale ==
In 1905, the NAA joined Germany, Spain, Belgium, the United Kingdom, Italy, Switzerland, and France to create an international aviation organization – Fédération Aéronautique Internationale – with the goal of fostering aeronautical activities worldwide. FAI is the organization responsible for establishing the rules for record-setting and competition, and also for recognizing international achievements in aeronautics and astronautics.

The NAA is the largest member of FAI and is responsible for appointing representatives to 15 major air sport and technical committees of FAI. The NAA also represents U.S. interests in aviation at the FAI's Annual General Conference.

== Mission ==
The NAA has three distinct responsibilities: The recording and certification of Aviation and Aerospace Records, the administration of Aviation Trophies and Awards, and working with Air Sports Organizations in America on the advancement of their individual sports.

== Aviation and aerospace records ==
The NAA has certified aviation and aerospace records in the United States since 1905. Its records database counts over 8,000 record flights to include those of balloons, airships, airplanes, (landplanes, seaplanes, amphibians, very light jets,) gliders, helicopters, autogiros, model aircraft, parachutes, human powered aircraft, spacecraft, tilt-wing/tilt-engine aircraft, hang gliders, paragliders, microlights, space models, and UAVs. In addition, the NAA certifies a wide variety of records including altitude, time-to-climb, distance, speed, greatest payload carried, and efficiency. As the U.S. representative to FAI, the National Aeronautic Association is the sole authority for overseeing and certifying all aviation records that take place within the United States. On average, the NAA certifies 150 records each year. The NAA records process is directed by the NAA Contest and Records Board and managed by the NAA Director of Contest and Records, Arthur W. Greenfield. It is easy to carry out a record attempt with an ordinary plane, but there is some paperwork and verification involved.

Contest and Record Board Members (as of January 1, 2012)

- Rodney M. Skaar, Chairman
- Richard A. Ionata, Vice-Chairman
- A.W. Greenfield, Secretary
- Bernard R. Gross
- Kristan R. Maynard
- Scott A. Neumann
- Brian G. Utley
- Sandy Anderson

Advisory Panel

- Larry E. Steenstry
- David B. Higginbotham
- Ardyth M. Williams

== Aviation trophies and awards ==
The NAA acknowledges the accomplishments and achievements in aviation and aerospace through its trophies and awards.

- Robert J. Collier Trophy: Established in 1910, is awarded annually "for the greatest achievement in aeronautics or astronautics in America, with respect to improving the performance, efficiency, and safety of air or space vehicles, the value of which has been thoroughly demonstrated by actual use during the preceding year."
- Wright Brothers Memorial Trophy: Established in 1948, to honor the memory of Orville and Wilbur Wright, is awarded annually to a living American for "significant public service of enduring value to aviation in the United States."
- Mackay Trophy: Established in 1912, is awarded annually for the "most meritorious flight of the year" by an Air Force person, persons, or organization. The United States Air Force determines the recipient and NAA awards it.
- Wesley L. McDonald Distinguished Statesman of Aviation Award: Established in 1954, is awarded annually to individuals who, for at least 25 years, has been actively identified with aeronautics and has made contributions of significant value to aeronautics.
- Frank G. Brewer Trophy: Established in 1943, is awarded annually to an individual, a group of individuals, or an organization for significant contributions of enduring value to aerospace education in the United States.
- Harmon Trophy for Aeronautics (Ballooning): Commonly known as simply the Harmon Trophy, was established in 1926 and is awarded annually for the most outstanding international achievement in the art and/or science of aeronautics (ballooning) for the previous year.
- Henderson Trophy: Honoring Clifford W. Henderson's legacy, was established in 1960, and is awarded annually to a living individual, group of individuals, or an organization whose vision, leadership or skill made a significant and lasting contribution to the promotion and advancement of aviation and aerospace in the United States.
- Katharine Wright Trophy: Established in 1981 and named after Wilbur and Orville Wright's sister, Katherine, is awarded annually to a woman who has contributed to the success of others, or made a personal contribution to the advancement of the art, sport and science of aviation and space flight over an extended period of time.
- Public Benefit Flying Awards: Established in 1983. A set of national awards designed to recognize the significant contributions to the Nation of volunteer-based Public Benefit Flying and the outstanding work of the individuals and organizations engaged in this humanitarian activity. Administered jointly by NAA and the Air Care Alliance there are five categories for this award: Distinguished Volunteer Pilot, Distinguished Volunteer, Outstanding Achievement in Advancement of Public Benefit Flying, Public Benefit Flying Teamwork Award, and Champion of Public Benefit Flying.
- Stinson Trophy: Established in 1997, to honor the accomplishments of sisters Katherine Stinson and Marjorie Stinson. It is awarded annually to a living woman for an outstanding and enduring contribution, a meritorious flight, or a singular technical development in the field of aviation, aeronautics, space or related sciences.

FAI Awards

Within the United States and its Territories, the NAA has the sole responsibility of administering awards established by the FAI.

- Gold Air Medal: Awarded to individuals who have contributed greatly to the development of aeronautics by their activities, work, achievements, initiative or devotion to the cause of aviation.
- Gold Space Medal: Awarded to individuals who have contributed greatly to the development of Astronautics by their activities, work, achievements, initiative or devotion to the cause of space.
- Sabiha Gökçen Medal: Awarded to a woman who performs the most outstanding achievement in any air sport in the previous year.
- Silver Medal: Awarded to an individual who has occupied high office in FAI or in an aeronautical organization in one of its member countries, and in the discharge of their duties have shown exceptional powers of leadership and influence, to the benefit of the whole international air sport community.
- Diploma for Outstanding Airmanship: Awarded to a person or a group of persons for a feat of outstanding airmanship in sub-orbital flight during one of the previous two years and which resulted in the saving of life of others and was carried out with that objective. Anyone engaged in a routine search and/or rescue mission shall not be eligible.
- Paul Tissandier Diploma. Awarded to those who have served the cause of Aviation in general and Sporting Aviation in particular, by their work, initiative, devotion or in other ways.
- Honorary Group Diploma: Awarded to groups of people (design offices, scientific bodies, aeronautical publications, etc.) that have contributed significantly to the progress of Aeronautics and Astronautics during the previous year or years.
- International Aviation Art Contest: Held annually to encourage young people worldwide to demonstrate the importance of aviation through art and to motivate them to become more familiar with and participate in aeronautics, engineering and science. The United States portion of the contest is sponsored by the National Aeronautic Association (NAA) in partnership with the National Association of State Aviation Officials (NASAO) and supported by Embry-Riddle Aeronautical University (ERAU), National Coalition for Aviation Education (NCAE) and the Federal Aviation Administration (FAA).

== Air Sports In America ==
The NAA encourages and supports the development and growth of the sport of aviation in the United States and does so primarily through its relationship with eight Air Sport Organizations (ASOs) based in the country. The NAA recognizes the ASOs as the official governing bodies for their respective air sports.

Air Sport Organizations

- Academy of Model Aeronautics
- Balloon Federation of America
- International Aerobatic Club
- Helicopter Club of America (Defunct)
- Soaring Society of America
- United States Hang Gliding and Paragliding Association
- United States Parachute Association
- United States Ultralight Association

== NAA leadership ==
Officers

- Chairman: Jim Albaugh
- Vice Chairman: Steve Callghan, Lockheed Martin
- Treasurer: Carl Johnson, Norsk Titanium
- Counsel: George Carneal, Hogan Lovells
- Secretary: Elizabeth Matarese
- President & CEO: Greg Principato

Board of Directors

- Ed Bolen, National Business Aviation Association
- Christopher Brunner, United Technologies/Pratt & Whitney
- Steve Champness, Aero Club of Metropolitan Atlanta
- Leda Chong, Gulfstream Aerospace Corporation
- John R. Dailey
- Pete Dumont, Air Traffic Control Association
- James Garrison, Soaring Society of America
- Arthur W. Greenfield Jr., NAA, Contest & Records Director
- Angela Gittens, Airport Council International
- Rich Hanson, Academy of Model Aeronautics
- Duane Hawkins, Spirit Aerosystems
- Margaret Jenny
- TC Jones, Northrop Grumman Corporation
- Tim Keating Boeing
- Leo Knaapen, Bombardier Aerospace
- Dick Koenig, Commemorative Air force
- Dr. John S. Langford, Aurora Flight Sciences
- Peter Lengyel, Safran
- Dr. Samantha Magill, American Institute of Aeronautics and Astronautics
- Clay McConnell, Airbus
- Margaret McKeough, Aero Club of Washington
- Mary Miller, BBA Aviation
- Mary Claire Murphy, Textron Aviation
- Martin Palmaz, US Hang Gliding and Paragliding Association
- Ken Panos Aerojet
- Eric Pierce, Lockheed Martin
- Pat Prentiss, The Ninety-Nines, Inc.
- Peter Prowitt, GE Aviation
- Mark Rector, Honda Aircraft Company
- Skip Ringo, The Ringo Group
- Darryl Roberson, Rolls-Royce, North America
- Jean Rosanvallon, Dassault Falcon
- John Stammreich, Aero Club of Southern California
- Bob Stangarone, Stangarone and Associates
- Alyssa Ten Eyck, Embraer
- Anthony L. Velocci, Aviation Week & Space Technology Magazine (Retired)
- FlightSafety International
- Rockwell Collins

Staff

- Art Greenfield, Director of Contests and Records
- Stephanie Berry, Director for Awards and Events
- Katherine McCormick, Manager, Office Services

== NAA membership ==
NAA has five groups of members: Corporate, Air Sport, Affiliate, Aero Clubs, and Individuals.

Corporate members

- Aerojet
- Airbus Group
- Aurora Flight Sciences
- Bombardier
- The Boeing Company
- Embraer
- GE Aviation
- Gulfstream
- Honda Aircraft Company
- Jeppesen
- Lockheed Martin Corporation
- Northrop Grumman Corporation
- Rockwell Collins, Inc
- Rolls-Royce North America
- Safe Flight Instrument Corporation
- Signature Flight Support
- Spirit AeroSystems
- Textron Aviation
- United Technologies Corporation

Air Sport members

- Academy of Model Aeronautics
- Balloon Federation of America
- International Aerobatic Club
- Soaring Society of America
- United States Hang Gliding and Paragliding Association
- United States Parachute Association
- United States Ultralight Association

Affiliate members

- Air Line Pilots Association
- Air Traffic Control Association
- Aerospace Industries Association
- Aircraft Owners and Pilots Association
- Airlines For America
- Airports Council International – NA
- American Institute of Aeronautics and Astronautics
- AUVSI
- Cargo Airline Association
- Experimental Aircraft Association
- General Aviation Manufacturers Association
- Helicopter Association International
- National Air Traffic Controllers Association
- National Air Transport Association
- National Association of State Aviation Officials
- National Business Aviation Association
- Radio Technical Commission for Aeronautics
- The Ninety-Nines

Aero Club members

- Aero Club of Metropolitan Atlanta
- Aero Club of New England
- Aero Club of Northern California
- Aero Club of Southern California
- Aero Club of Washington
- Wichita Aeroclub

Individual members

As of December 31, 2014 NAA has 1,029 individual members.

== NAA Luncheon Program ==
The NAA Luncheon Program brings together leaders in the aviation and aerospace industry with professionals from around the Metropolitan Washington, DC region. Speakers from the highest levels of government, industry, and associations have addressed important issues related to the Department of Defense, the military services, and Aerospace Industry Affairs.

The NAA Luncheon Program is directed by the NAA National Aviation Awards and Events Committee.
