= Aerotechnics Skyhopper-3000 =

German ultralight trike

General information
- Type: Ultralight trike
- National origin: Germany
- Manufacturer: Aerotechnics EPV GmbH
- Status: Production completed (2016)

The Aerotechnics Skyhopper-3000 is a German ultralight trike that was designed and produced by Aerotechnics of Brandenburg. It was supplied complete and ready-to-fly when available.

The company was founded around 2010, went out of business in 2016, and production ceased by that time.

== Design and development ==
The Skyhopper-3000 is a nanotrike that was designed to comply with the Fédération Aéronautique Internationale microlight category, the US FAR 103 Ultralight Vehicles rules and the German 120 kg class. The aircraft is German DULV certified.

The design features a cable-braced hang glider-style high-wing, weight-shift controls, a single-seat open-frame cockpit without a cockpit fairing, tricycle landing gear and a single engine in pusher configuration.

The aircraft is made from titanium tubing, with its double surface wing covered in Dacron sailcloth. Its wing is supported by a single tube-type kingpost and uses an "A" frame weight-shift control bar. The powerplant is an air-cooled, single-cylinder, two-stroke, 27 hp (20 kW) Cisco C-Max engine. The aircraft has an empty weight of 26 kg (57 lb), including the powerplant, but excluding the wing. It has a gross weight of 155 kg (342 lb).

A number of different hang glider wings can be fitted to the basic carriage. The carriage and wing can be folded for ground transportation.

The Skyhopper-3000 has also been used for towing hang gliders aloft.

== Variants ==
Skyhopper-3000
Version powered by a single-cylinder, 27 hp (20 kW) Cisco C-Max piston engine
Skyhopper-3000E
Electric aircraft version, powered by an electric motor

== Specifications (Skyhopper-3000) ==
Data from Tacke

General characteristics

- Crew: one
- Empty weight: 26 kg (57 lb) plus wing weight
- Gross weight: 155 kg (342 lb)
- Fuel capacity: 9 litres (2.0 imp gal; 2.4 US gal)
- Powerplant: 1 × Cisco C-Max single-cylinder, air-cooled, two stroke aircraft engine, 20 kW (27 hp)
- Propellers: 2-bladed fixed pitch

Performance

- Maximum speed: 120 km/h (75 mph, 65 kn)
- Cruise speed: 90 km/h (56 mph, 49 kn)
- Stall speed: 35 km/h (22 mph, 19 kn)
- Rate of climb: 4.5 m/s (890 ft/min)
