= Skyhopper =

Skyhopper may refer to:

- Skyhopper (Star Wars), a vehicle in Star Wars
- Skyhopper (Transformers), a Transformers character
- Aerotechnics Skyhopper-3000, a German ultralight trike
- Salvay-Stark Skyhopper, a low-wing single-place homebuilt aircraft
