= USUA =

American non-profit organization

The United States Ultralight Association (USUA) is a non-profit organization that endeavors to support ultralight aviation and ultralight aircraft

It is the oldest ultralight organization in the US, formed after motors began appearing on hang gliders in the early 1980s. USUA developed training programs to help the minimally regulated sport improve safety.

USUA is the internationally recognized representative for ultralight competition in the U.S. through the Fédération Aéronautique Internationale (FAI).

In 2006 the USUA partnered with the United States Powered Paragliding Association (USPPA) to better represent the powered paragliding segment of ultralight aviation.
