= Powered skydiving =

Powered skydiving is an activity where a skydiver jumps from some height (usually an airplane) wearing propulsion and small wings to fly their bodies. Efforts have been made by wingsuit flyers to sustain altitude, but the most successful was Yves Rossy who jumped out of an airplane wearing airplane-type rigid wings with four small jet motors attached to them.

== See also ==
- Powered paragliding alias paramotoring, where the person takes off from the ground.
