= Swedish Aerosport Mosquito =

Mosquito
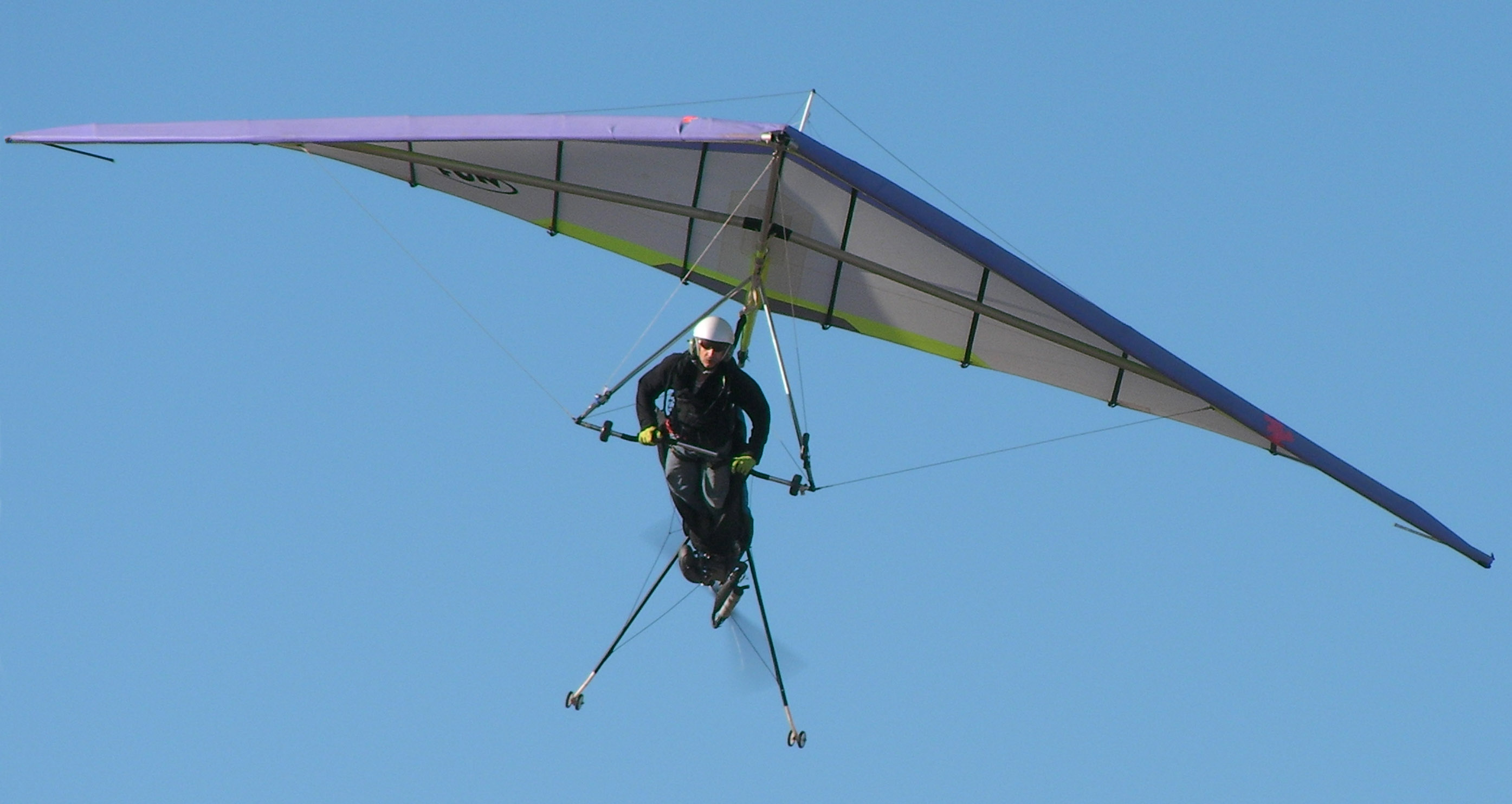

General information
- Type: Powered hang glider
- National origin: Sweden
- Manufacturer: Swedish Aerosport

History
- Introduction date: 1995

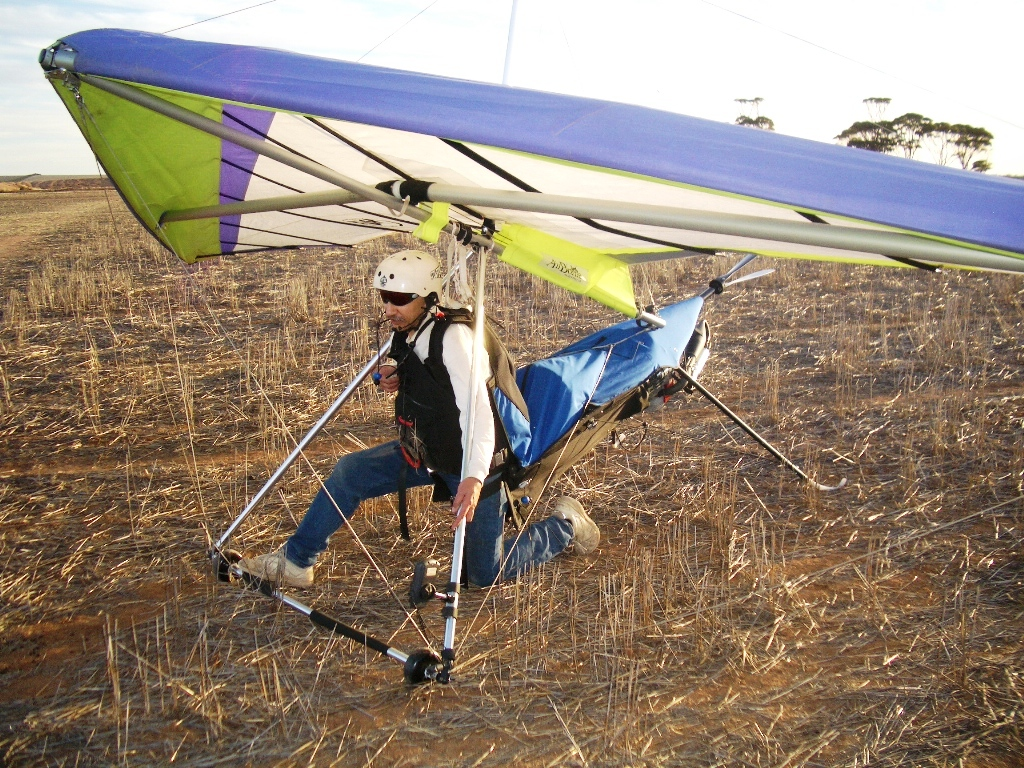
Mosquito NRG fitted to an Airborne Fun 160 glider

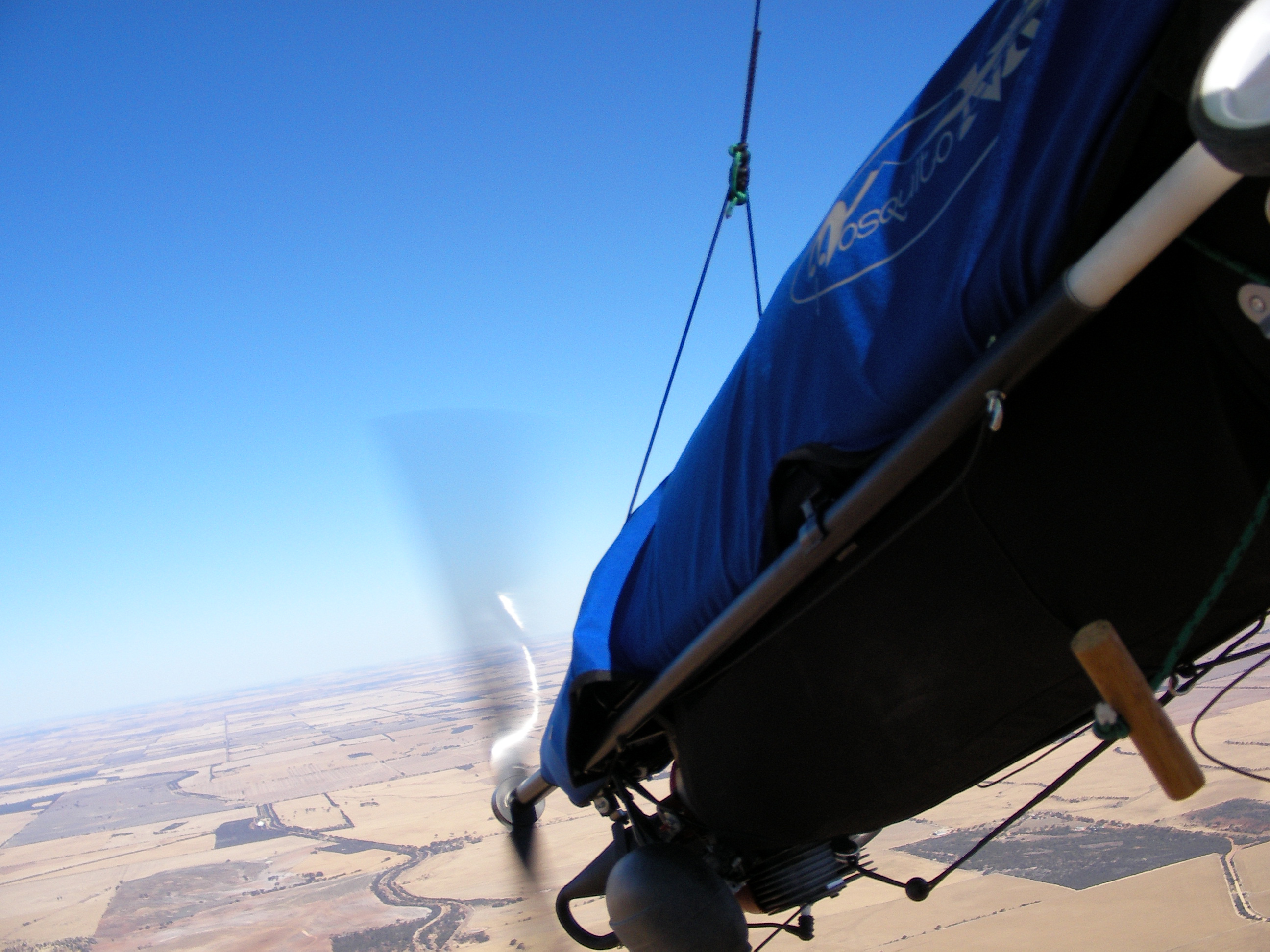
The engine and pusher propeller fit behind the pilot's feet

The Swedish Aerosport Mosquito is a Swedish powered hang glider harness designed and produced by Swedish Aerosport and introduced in 1995.

== Design and development ==
The Mosquito was the power package that started renewed interest in the powered self-launching hang glider concept when it was introduced in 1995. The power package can be mated with a large number of modern hang glider wings. Ready to fly the complete aircraft features a cable-braced hang glider-style high-wing, weight-shift control set up, single-place accommodation, foot-launching and landing and a single engine in pusher configuration.

The aircraft uses a standard hang glider wing, made from bolted-together aluminum tubing, with its wing covered in Dacron sailcloth. The wing is supported by a single tube-type kingpost and uses an "A" frame control bar. The engine is a lightweight, two-stroke, single cylinder Radne Raket 120 of 14 hp (10 kW) that produces power though a 3.5:1 belt reduction drive, with an extension shaft. Folding legs carry a large percentage of the unit's weights and protect the propeller during ground operations. The Mosquito is purchased as a complete harness assembly.

The original Mosquito design was updated in 2001 as the Mosquito NRG, which remained in production until 2022. The NRG incorporates a flat back plate, front opening, propeller brake, integrated controls and electric starting.

Wings that are approved for the Mosquito include the A-I-R Atos rigid wing the Icaro Piuma and the Aeros Discus M.

== Specifications (Mosquito) ==
Data from Cliche

General characteristics

- Crew: one
- Empty weight: 44 lb (20 kg) plus the wing weight
- Fuel capacity: 1.5 U.S. gallons (5.7 L; 1.2 imp gal)
- Powerplant: 1 × Radne Raket 120 single cylinder, two-stroke, air-cooled aircraft engine, 14 hp (10 kW)

Performance

- Cruise speed: 25 mph (40 km/h, 22 kn)
- Stall speed: 14 mph (23 km/h, 12 kn) depending on wing employed
- Endurance: About 2 hours
- Rate of climb: 400 ft/min (2.0 m/s)

== Image gallery ==
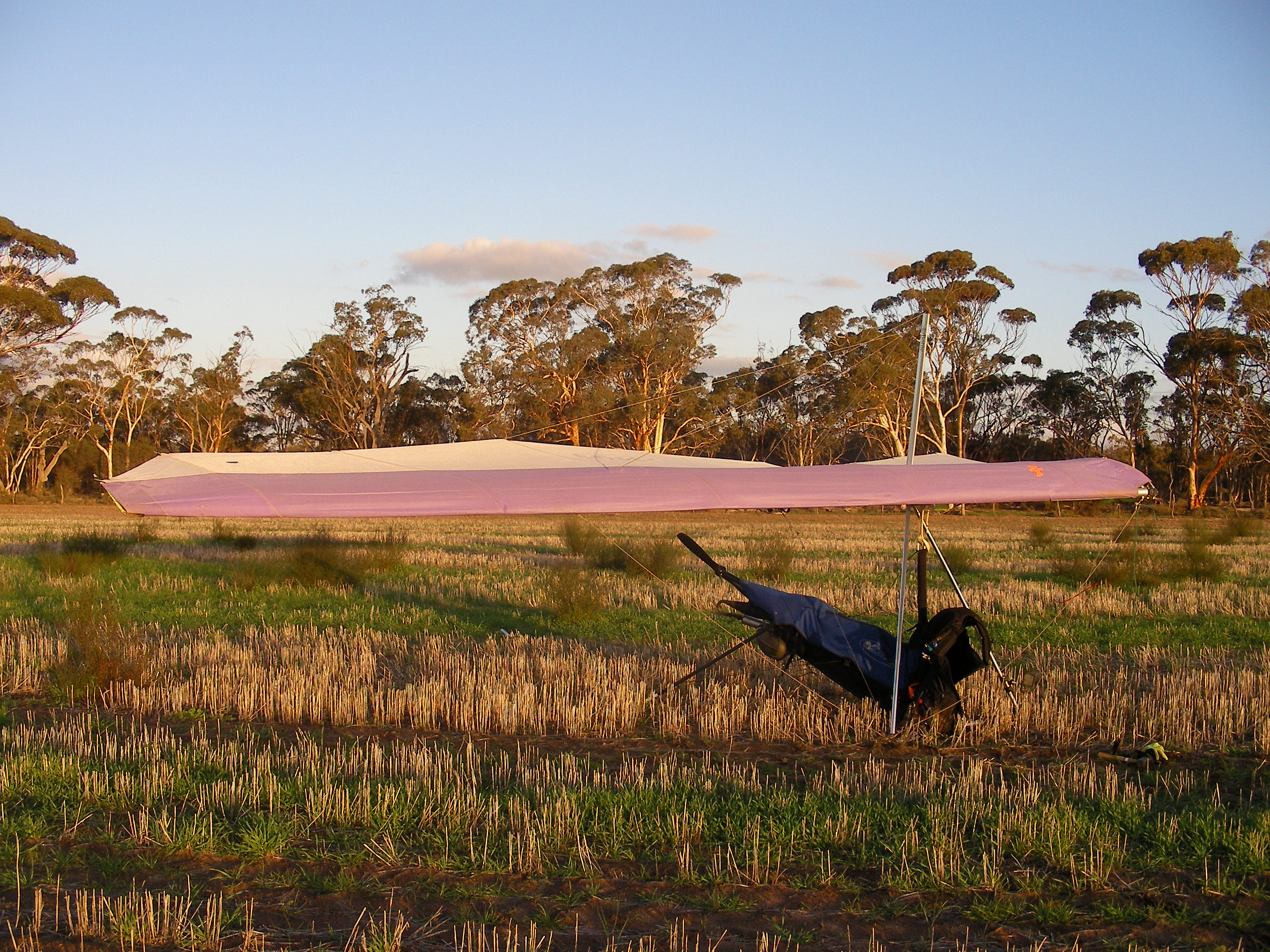
The harness attached to the glider when it is tethered nose down and into wind

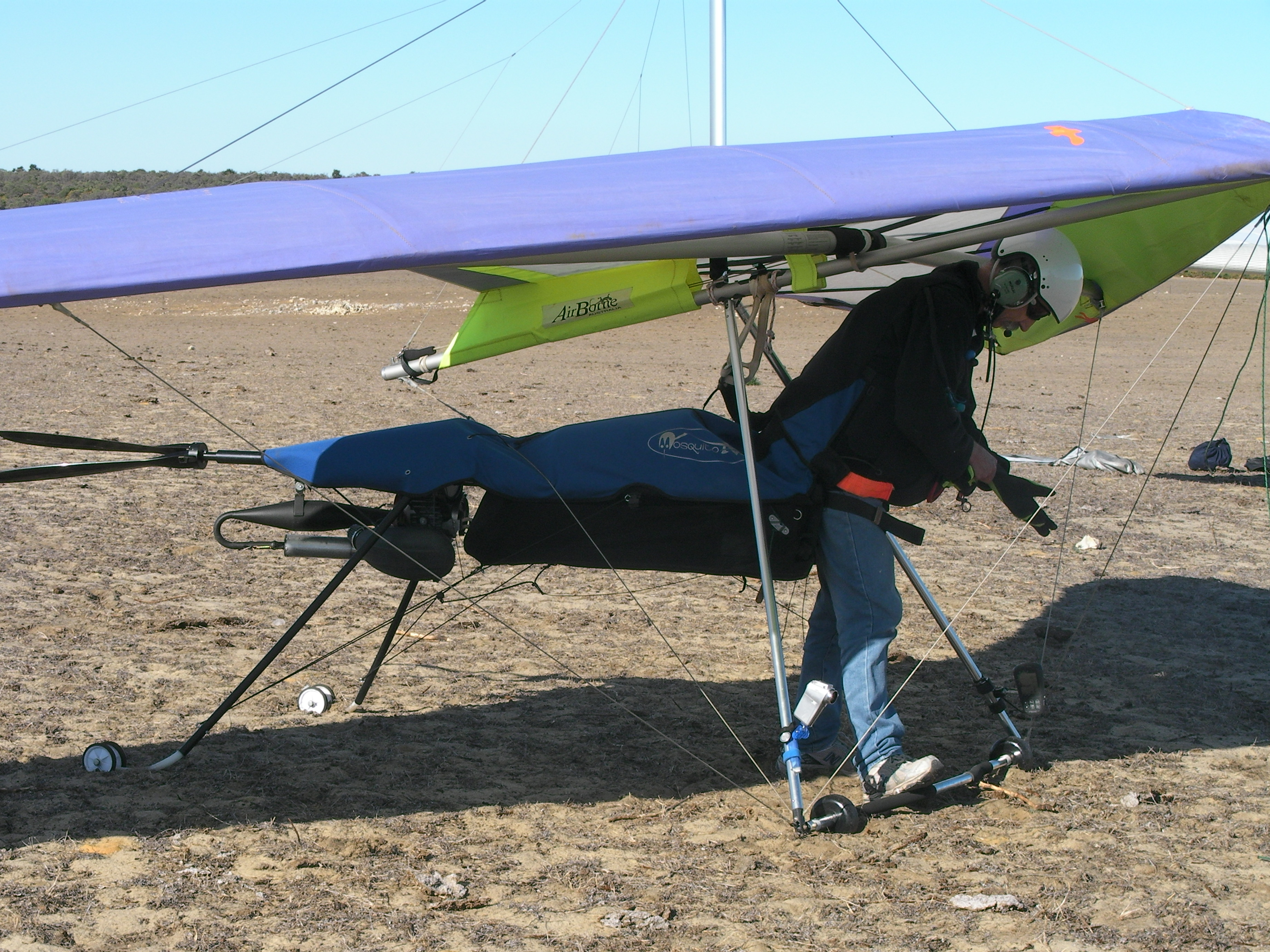
With full fuel the motorised harness weighs around 15 kg more than a standard hang gliding harness

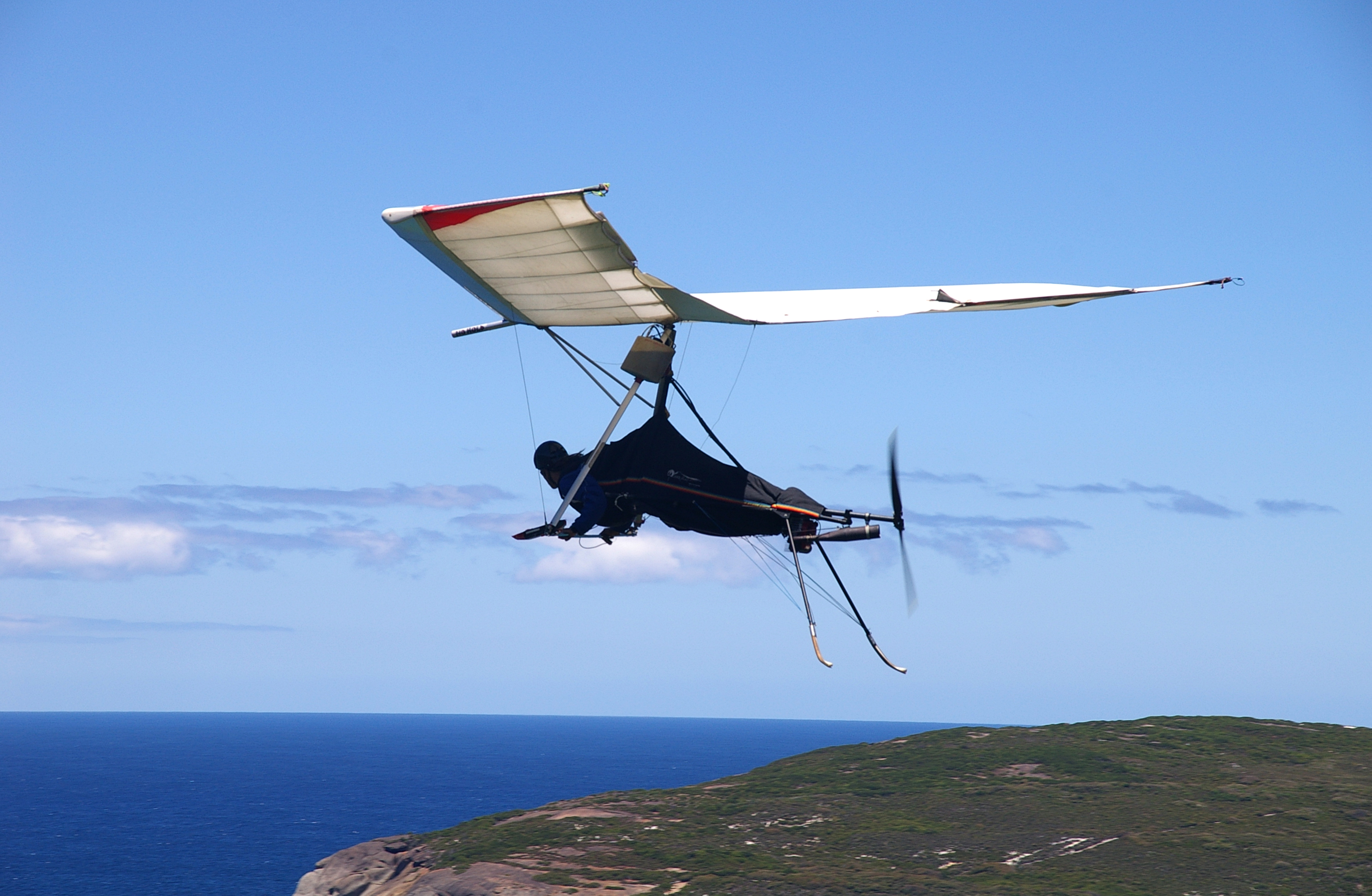
A Pegasus rigid wing hang glider with a Mosquito A10 harness, the model previous to the NRG

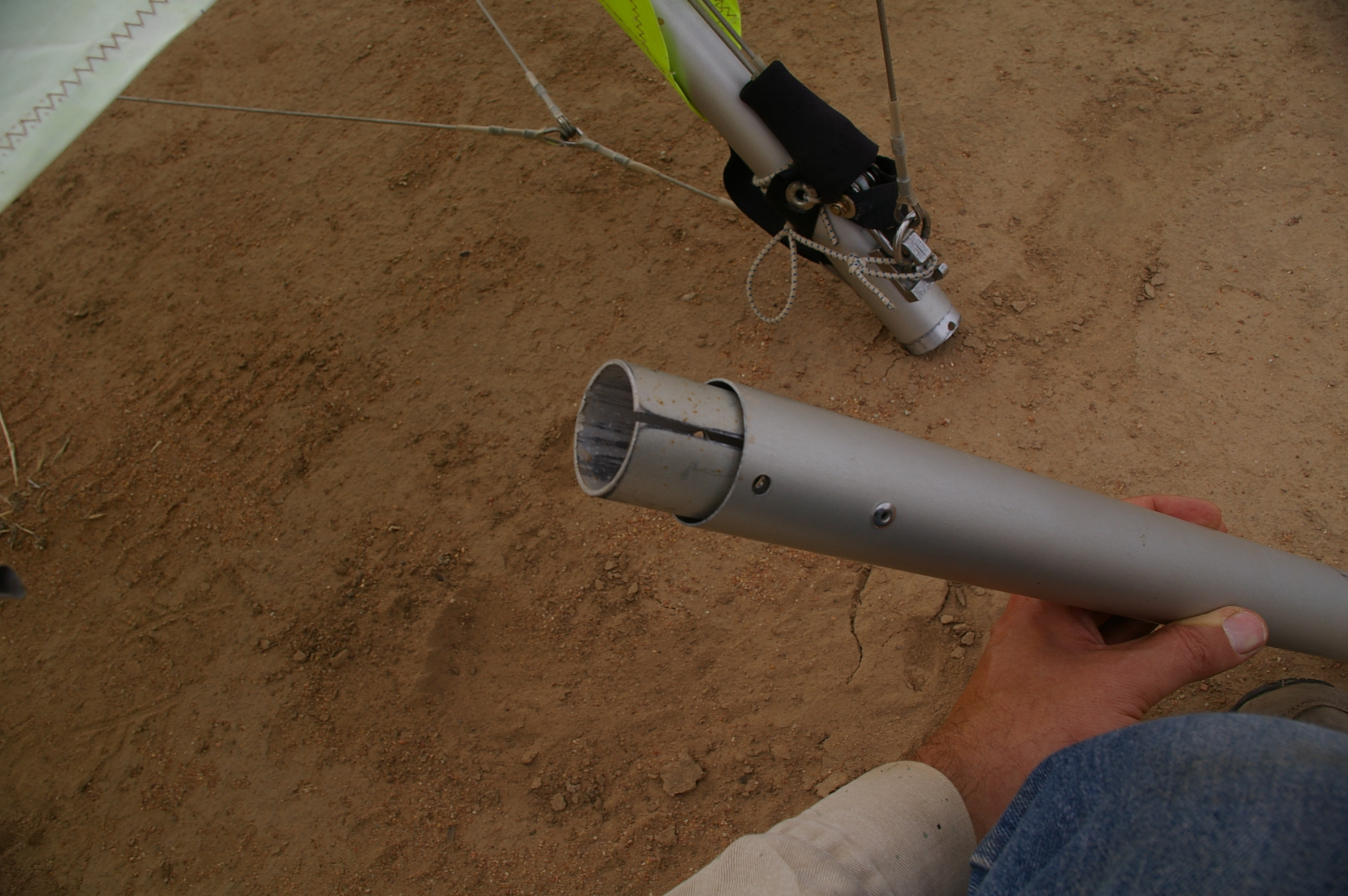
The tail section of the keel is removed to prevent conflict with the propeller.
