= Jonathan Gaffney =

Jonathan Gaffney was President and CEO of the National Aeronautic Association of the United States. He was named President on July 9, 2007. Gaffney is credited with leading a NAA from near-default in 2007 to 7 consecutive years of operational profit (2008-2015). He announced his resignation on June 4, 2016, and departed on September 30, 2016.

== Education ==
Graduated from Quinnipiac University in 1983 with a BS and AA, and graduated from the University of Pittsburgh in 1988 with a master's degree in Public and International Affairs and was named the first Ridgeway Foundation Scholar.

== Career ==
From 1991-1995, he served as Legislative Director for Congressmen Jim Moran of Virginia. He served as Medical Service Corps Officer in the United States Navy from 1983-2005 and retired with the rank of Commander. From 1995-2007 he served as the Vice President for Communications for the Metropolitan Washington Airports Authority where he had executive responsibility for the Authority’s media, communications, community relations, governmental affairs, and noise abatement program. He served as Acting Airport Manager of Ronald Reagan Washington National Airport from May–July 2006.
