= Powered paragliding =

Form of ultralight aviation

Paramotoring
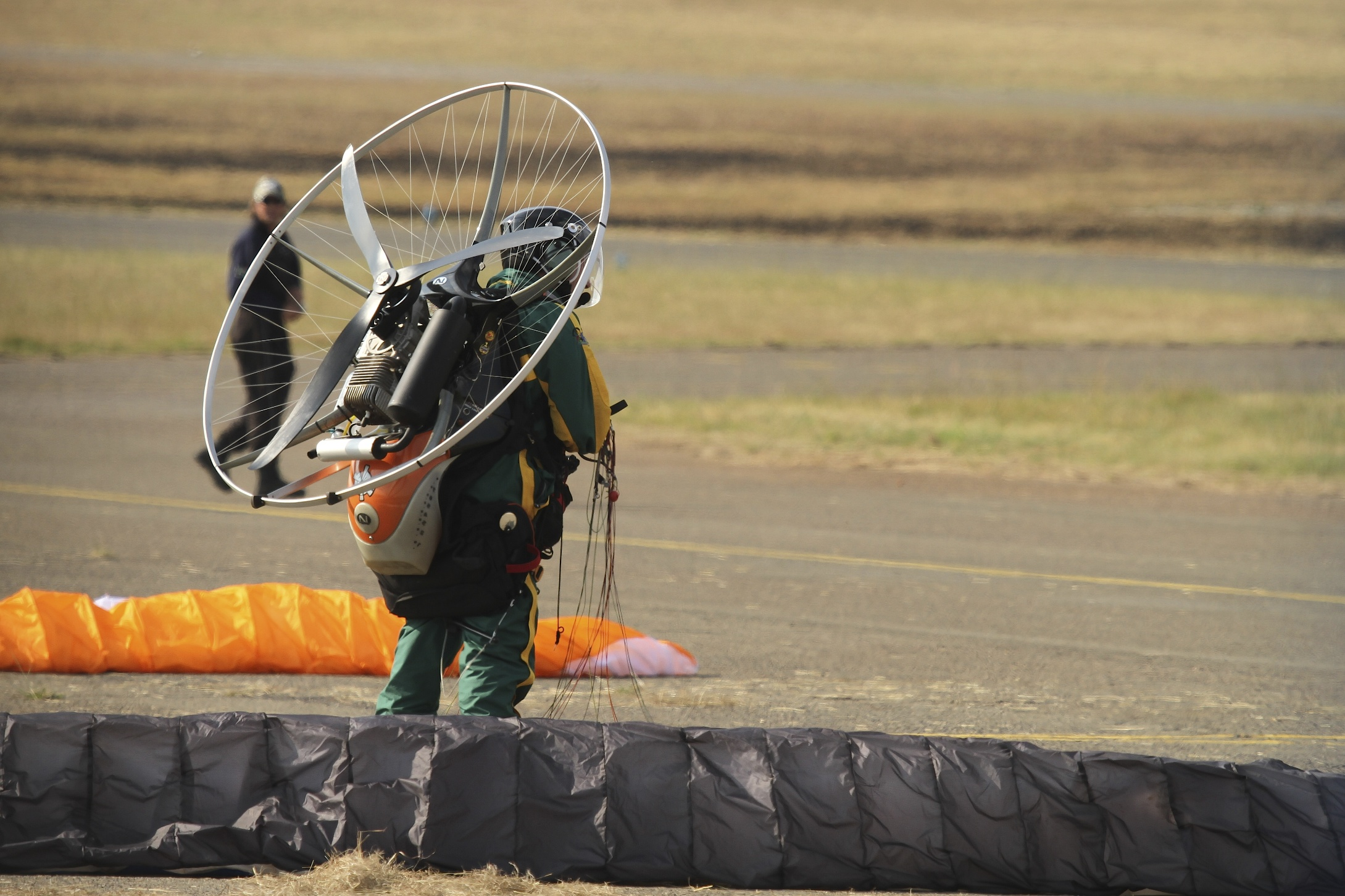
- Paramotor
- Highest governing body: Fédération Aéronautique Internationale

Characteristics
- Contact: No
- Mixed-sex: Yes
- Type: Air sports

Presence
- Country or region: Worldwide
- Olympic: No
- World Games: 2017

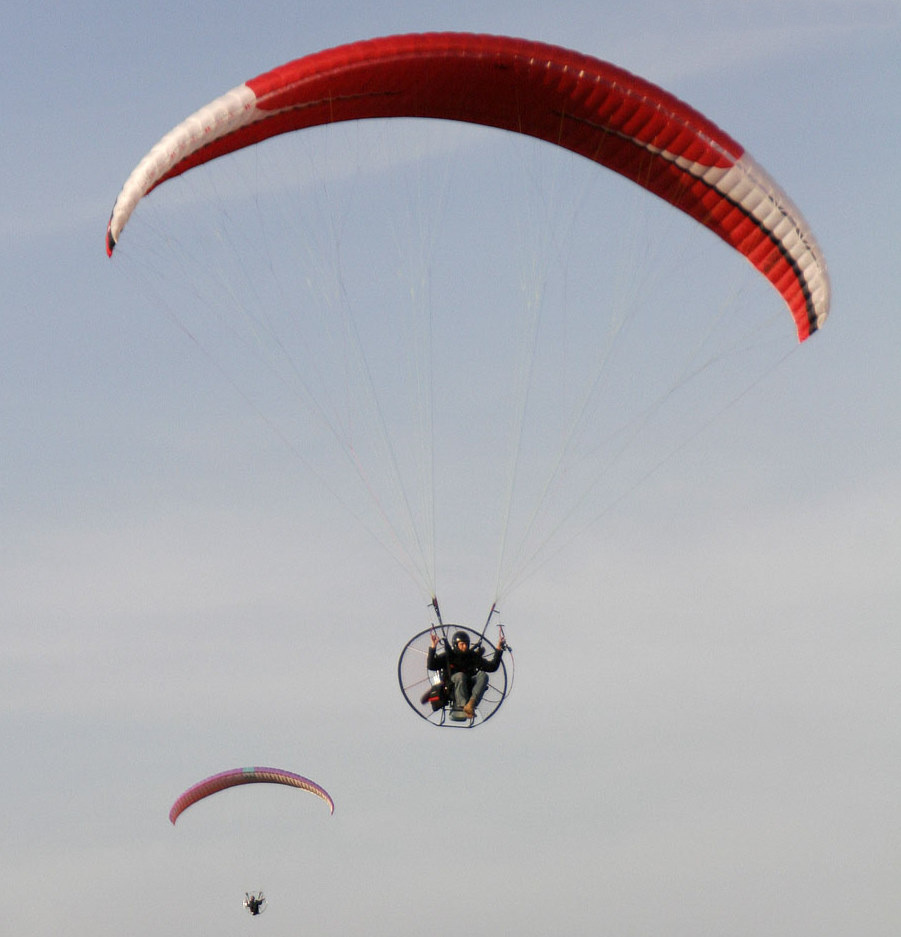
Two powered paragliders in flight

Powered paraglider at a Kanagawa beach in Japan, 2022

Powered paragliding, also known as paramotoring or PPG, is a form of ultralight aviation where the pilot wears a back-pack motor (a paramotor) which provides enough thrust to take off using a paraglider. It can be launched in still air, and on level ground, by the pilot alone—no assistance is required.

== Description ==
In many countries, including the United States, powered paragliding is minimally regulated and requires no license. The ability to fly both low and slow safely, the "open" feel, the minimal equipment and maintenance costs, and the portability are claimed to be this type of flying's greatest merits.

Powered paragliders usually fly between 15 and 50 mph (24 and 80 km/h) at altitudes from 'foot-dragging' up about to 18,000 ft (5,500 m) or more with certain permission. Due to the paramotor's slow forward speed and nature of a soft wing, it is risky to operate in high winds, turbulence, or intense thermal activity, especially for inexperienced pilots.

The paramotor, weighing from 45 to 90 lb (20 to 41 kg) is supported by the pilot during takeoff. After a brief run (typically 10 ft (3.0 m)) the wing lifts the motor and its harnessed pilot off the ground. After takeoff, the pilot gets into the seat and sits suspended beneath the inflated paraglider wing like a pendulum. Control is available using right and left brake toggles and a hand-held throttle control for the motor and propeller speed. Some rigs are equipped with trimmers and speed bar to adjust angle of incidence, which also changes the angle of attack for increased or reduced speed. Brake toggles and weight shift is the general method for controlling yaw and roll (turning). Tip brakes and stabilo steering (if equipped) will also affect yaw and roll, and they may be used for more efficient flying or when required by the wing manufacturer in certain wing configurations such as reflex. The throttle controls pitch (along with speed bar and trimmers). Unlike regular aircraft, increasing throttle causes a pitch-up and climb (or reduced descent) but does not increase airspeed.

== Uses ==
Paragliders are usually used for personal recreation, with some exceptions.

=== Military ===
Powered paragliding has seen some military application including insertion of special forces soldiers and also border patrol in some governments. The Lebanese Airborne regiment adopted this technique in 2008. The US Army and Egyptian Army have used Paramotor Inc FX series units for many years, and these units are still under production. During the outset of the Gaza war, Hamas militants used six powered paragliders to bypass the Gaza–Israel barrier and infiltrate southern Israel, several of which were used in the Re'im music festival massacre. During the Myanmar civil war, the Tatmadaw used powered paragliders (dubbed "paramotors") to drop bombs on resistance villages and civilian targets.

The U.S. military has shown growing interest in powered paragliders for small-unit operations. In 2024, the Marine Corps revealed plans for initial operational capability of its Augmented Parachute System (APS) by fiscal year 2027, and the Army solicited for a Personnel Air Mobility System to equip airborne forces, citing the difficulty of using conventional aircraft in anti-access/area-denial environments. In 2026, UK-based Blakcro unveiled the P1 at SOF Week in Tampa, described as the first powered paraglider designed for military use from the outset rather than adapted from a recreational design. Intended for special operations forces, it features noise-reduction engineering—including a repositioned fuel tank claimed to reduce detectable distance by over 20%—and propellers shaped to reduce radar signature. Blakcro stated it was engaged with the SOCOM foreign competitive test team and had already delivered systems to multiple NATO militaries.

In August 2026, The Times and the Ministry of Defence reported that Blakcro had received approximately £6 million in funding from the UK Ministry of Defence, delivered through UK Defence Innovation (UKDI), a Ministry initiative supporting defence suppliers new to the sector. The Royal Marines and the Parachute Regiment were scheduled to trial the system, which folds into a rucksack-sized case, can be assembled in under eight minutes in darkness, and has a stated range of up to 200 miles under its own power. Built around a titanium airframe, it was designed to accommodate body armour, night-vision equipment and weapon mounts, with a reduced acoustic, visual and radar signature intended to support covert insertion. Blakcro reported that UKDI's support had helped it secure three prime contracts with the UK and NATO allies.

In 2026, UK Defence Innovation (UKDI) and the Defence Science and Technology Laboratory (Dstl) announced funding for Blakcro to develop an unmanned variant of its military powered paraglider platform. The planned autonomous paramotor is intended for cargo delivery, carrying payloads of 100–200 kg over a range of 100–200 miles, and was expected to be ready for evaluation within about 18 months of the announcement.

=== Civilian ===
Because of limiting weather requirements, powered paragliders are not reliable replacements for most aviation uses.

They have been used for search and rescue, herding of animals, photography, surveying, and other uses, but regulations in most countries limit commercial activities.

== Safety and regulations ==
Research estimates that the activity is slightly safer (fewer fatalities per thousand participants per year) than riding motorcycles and more dangerous than riding in cars. The most likely cause of serious injury is body contact with a spinning propeller. The next most likely cause of injury is flying into something other than the landing zone. Some countries run detailed statistics on accidents, e.g., in Germany in 2018 about 36,000 paragliding pilots registered 232 accidents, where 109 caused serious injury and 9 were fatal.

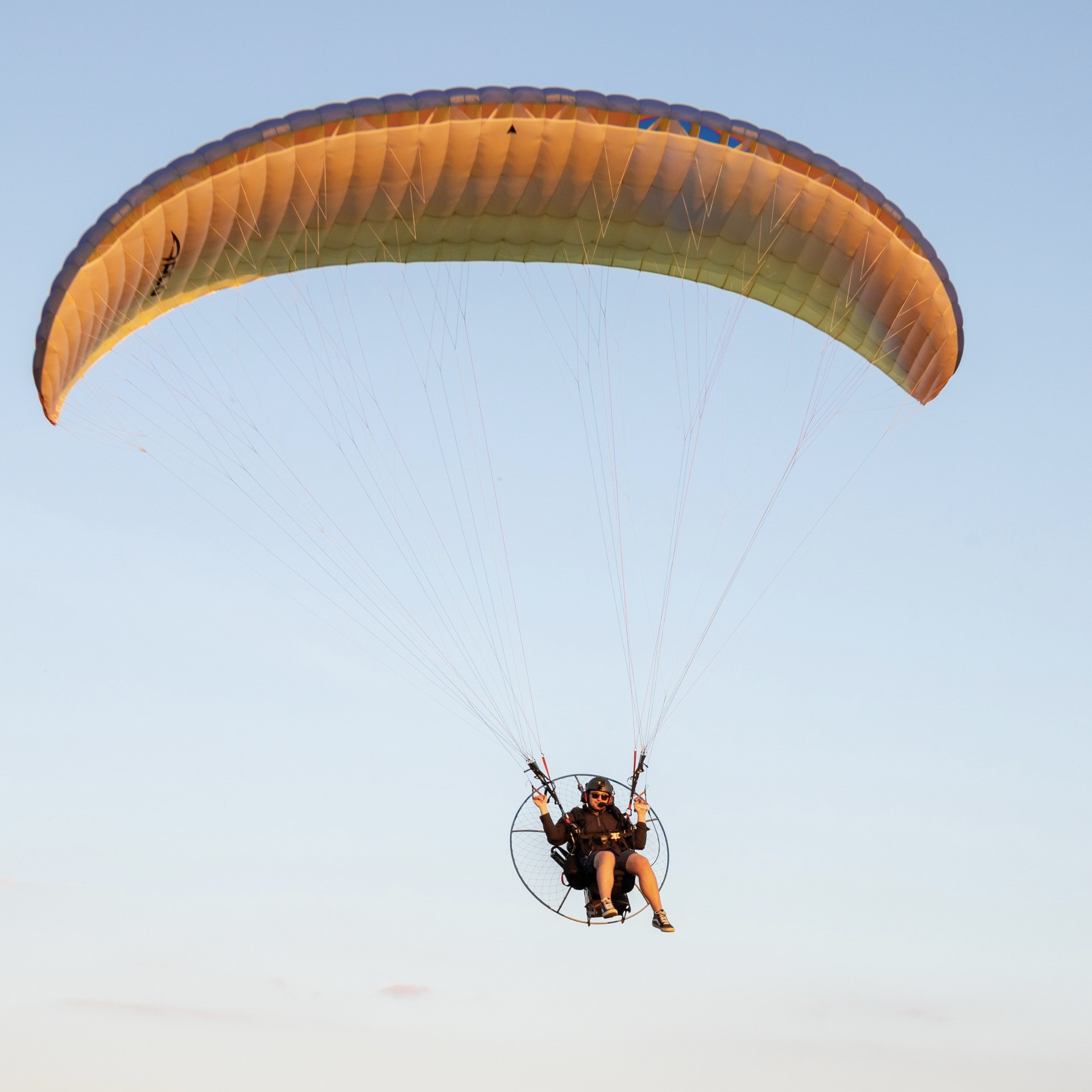
A powered paraglider (paramotor) flies by.

Some pilots carry a reserve parachute designed to open in as little as 50 ft (15 m). While reserve parachutes are designed to open fast, they have a system length between 13.3 ft (4.5 m) and 21.9 ft (7.3 m) and usually need at least 150 ft (46 m) to slow down a pilot to a safe sink rate (certified design speed according to LTF and EN certifications is max 18 ft (5.5 m) per second). With enough height over ground, many potential issues with the canopy can be resolved without applying the reserve parachute. The required skills can be acquired in SIV trainings, which improve the overall safety of flying by providing a better understanding on the system limitations and practical training of extreme situations.

The lack of established design criteria for these aircraft led the British Air Accidents Investigation Branch to conclude in 2007 that "only when precise reserve factors have been established for individual harness/wing combinations carrying realistic suspended masses, at load factors appropriate to the maneuvers to be carried out, can these aircraft be considered to be structurally safe".

=== Training ===
For a pilot to get through most organizations' full pilot syllabus requires between five and 15 days which may expand due to bad weather. A number of techniques are employed for teaching, although most include getting the student familiar with handling the wing either on the ground, via towing, small hills, or on tandem flights.

Two-person aircraft (so-called 'tandem' paramotors) are sometimes used for training depending on local regulations.

=== Regulations ===
In most countries, paramotor pilots operate under simple rules that spare them from burdensome certification requirements.

==== United States ====
In the United States, powered paragliders are regulated as aircraft by the FAA, meeting the definition in 14 CFR 1.1 - General definitions, being a "device that is used or intended to be used for flight in the air".

U.S. pilots virtually always operate under 14 CFR § 103. Under this regulation, neither a license nor specific training is required though the sport is more dangerous when practiced without proper training. Pilots are restricted in where they can fly and must avoid areas of urban/suburban population to minimize risk to other people or property. Pilots may also only fly themselves and may not take a passenger without a waiver from the FAA.

==== United Kingdom ====
In the United Kingdom, paramotors are regulated by the Civil Aviation Authority, are classified as self-propelled hang-gliders, and can be flown without registration or a license as long as they weigh less than 70 kg, have a stall speed not exceeding 35 knots, and are foot-launched. Wheel-launched paramotors are allowed under the additional conditions that they do not carry passengers, and have a stall speed of 20 knots or less, but may weigh up to 75 kg if they carry a reserve parachute.

== Associations ==
In the U.S., the sport is represented primarily by the US Powered Paragliding Association (USPPA) (Note: Unpowered paragliders are represented by the U.S. Hang Gliding and Paragliding Association (USHPA), which distanced itself from any motorized flying in 2006."USHPA Member Handbook".) which also holds an exemption allowing two-place training by appropriately certified tandem instructors. The US Ultralight Association (USUA) and Aero Sports Connections (ASC) also offer some support.

Instructors in the U.S. are primarily represented and certified by the United States Powered Paragliding Association (USPPA).

In the United Kingdom, the sport is represented by the British Hang Gliding and Paragliding Association.

Internationally, there is "APPI Power"., which was founded in 2011 and has since become a leading organisation for paramotor training and certification, with established global standards for pilot and instructor training.

== Confusion with powered parachutes ==
There is often confusion about the differences between powered paragliders (PPG) and powered parachutes (PPC), both terminologically and even sometimes visually, particularly in flight. A PPG differs from a PPC primarily in size, power, control method, and number of occupants.

In simple terms, PPCs always include a wheeled airframe and are often controlled using steering bars pushed on by the feet to operate the steering controls, although there are exceptions such as the Australian Aerochute and the German Xcitor. The airframe is an integral component of the aircraft (as established by FAA regulations).

PPGs, on the other hand, normally don't have a wheeled airframe and almost exclusively steer using the hands to pull on the steering lines. When paragliding, an airframe is considered purely a higher end option; in fact, since a PPG wing is always to be attached to the harness, if the airframe used in a PPG failed in any way, the wing would continue to support the weight of the occupants and motor through the harness. In addition, because PPGs use smaller low-power engines to stay within 14 C.F.R. § 103 regulations, they frequently use a higher performance parafoil that visually appears thinner and more elliptical to compensate.

Any other distinctions are less clear. In the United States, all paragliding equipment must fall within 14 C.F.R. § 103, and pilot licensing (in the strict legal sense) is not applicable, which is not much different from ultralight PPCs. Other lines are blurred further. For example, some people previously argued that two-seat flying is only allowed using a PPC, but "tandem" (two-seat) paragliding is readily doable in many countries throughout the world, and limited types of tandem paragliding are legally authorized in the U.S. as a result of an FAA exemption for flight training only (since 2018, with subsequent extensions).

Another contributing reason for confusion nowadays comes from the fact that some aircraft and kit builders market ultralight-class rolling airframes that can be configured with either PPG-style hand steering or PPC-style foot steering (along with wider canopy attachment points), with the later sold as a 14 C.F.R. § 103 'powered parachute'. The net result is nearly identical aircraft, albeit with different steering systems and potentially different canopy types.

== World records ==
Determined by the FAI, RPF1 category.

- The current world altitude record for powered paragliders (RPF1TM) is 7,589m (24 898 ft). It was set by Ramon Morillas Salmeron (Granada, Spain) on 19 September 2009 while flying an Advance Sigma paraglider and a PAP frame powered by a HE R220Duo engine.
- A highly publicized altitude record attempt was made by Bear Grylls on 14 May 2007 at 0933 local time over the Himalayas using a Parajet engine invented by Gilo Cardozo and a specifically designed reflex paraglider wing invented by Mike Campbell-Jones of Paramania. Cardozo, who also flew in the attempt, had engine problems that ended his climb 300m short of the record. Grylls went on to claim an altitude of 8,990 m (29,494 ft), though satisfactory evidence of this claim was not submitted to FAI, and therefore it was not ratified as a world record for this aircraft class.
- Distance in a straight line without landing: 1,105 km (687 mi) set on 23 April 2007 by Ramon Morillas Salmeron flying from Jerez de la Frontera, Cádiz (Spain) to Lanzarote, Canary Islands (Spain) with an Advance Omega 7 paraglider.
- Fastest Crossing of the United States of America Direct Path 2104 Miles in December 2020. Harley Milne (50xChallenge) cross the southern route from San Diego to Jacksonville Florida in 8 days 2 hours. Flying 48 hours 19 minutes, over 22 flights with a maximum 12,444 AGL and Max Speed of 89.9 MPH ground speed.

Determined by Guinness World Records

- The longest journey by powered paraglider is 9,132 km (5,674.35 mi) and was achieved by Miroslav Oros (Czech Republic), flying throughout the Czech Republic, starting in Sazená and ending in Lipovå-lázn, between 1 April 2011 and 30 June 2011.
- 2nd Longest Journey by Powered Paraglider: 8,008 km (4,976 mi) set on 24 August 2009 by Canadian photographer and documentary filmmaker Benjamin Jordan during his Above + Beyond Canada campaign. In an unprecedented flight between Tofino, BC and Bay Saint Lawrence, NS, the cross-Canada campaign involved 108 flights with landings at schools and youth summer camps along the way. Jordan provided youth with motivational speeches and arranged them in shapes on the ground before launching and continuing on the next leg of his journey. Funds raised over the course of the trip were donated to various charities across Canada to help children from low-income homes attend summer camp.
- First Paramotor Pilot to Fly in all 50 US States. The fastest time to fly a paramotor/ powered paraglider in all 50 US states is 215 days and was achieved by Harley Milne (USA), across USA from 8 November 2019 to 10 June 2020. While achieving this record Harley is also the first to complete this undertaking.

== Images ==
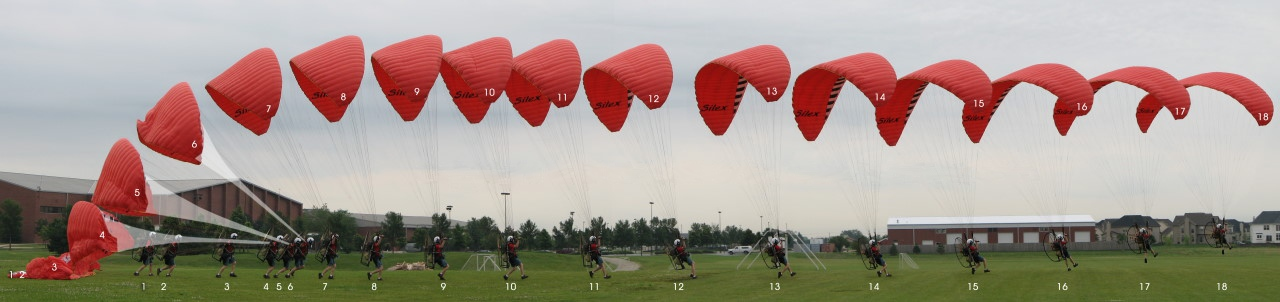
Launch of a powered paraglider
A powered paraglider in flight

A tandem powered paraglider

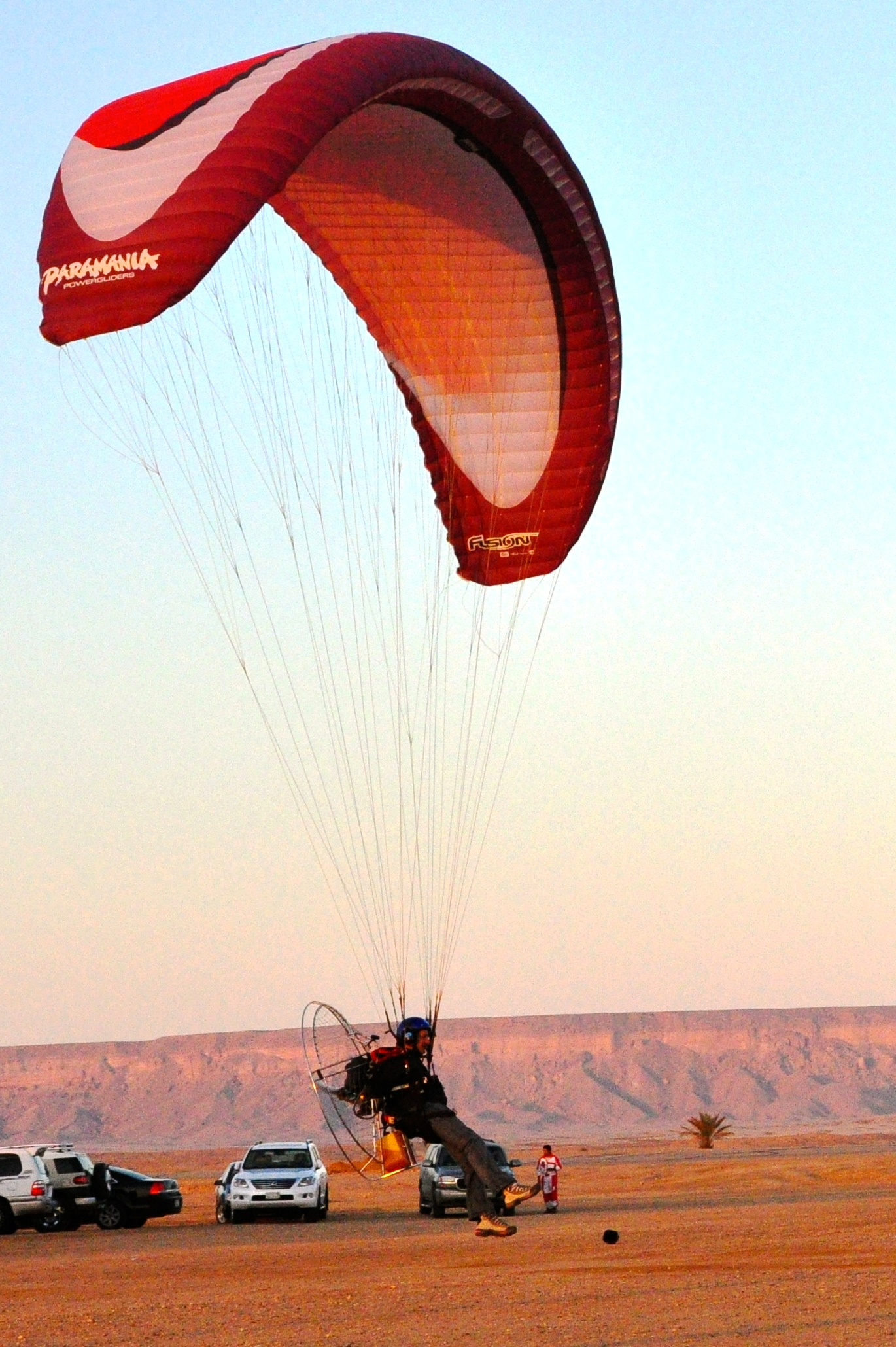
Powered paraglider landing

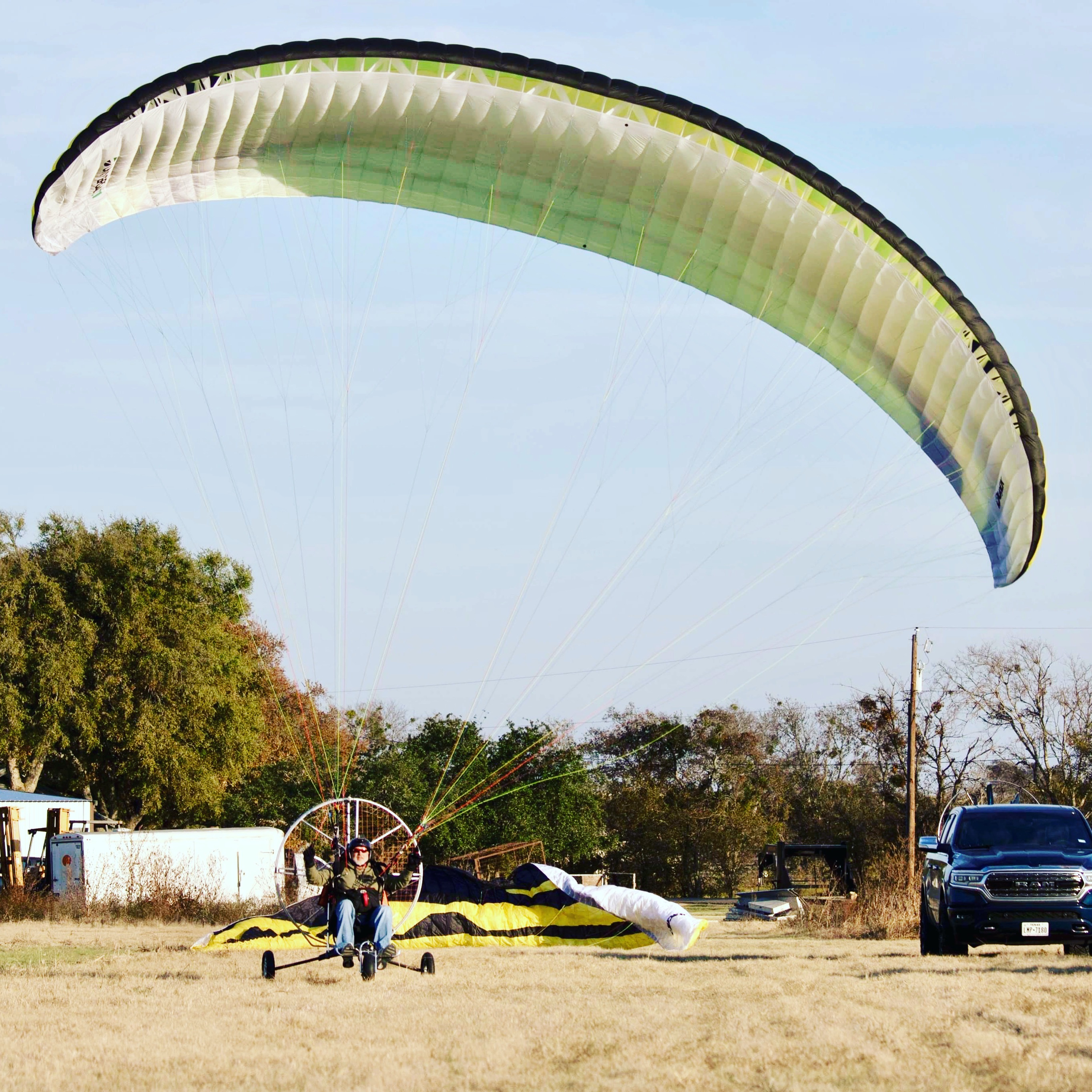
Power paraglider trike launch

== See also ==
- Fan Man
- Hang gliding
- Jet pack – flying with a parafoil and a jetpack
- Kite
- Paramotor
- Powered hang glider
- Powered parachute
- Powered skydiving, where the participant jumps out of an aircraft
- Ultralight trike
- USPPA
