= Powered hang glider =

Foot-launched powered hang glider

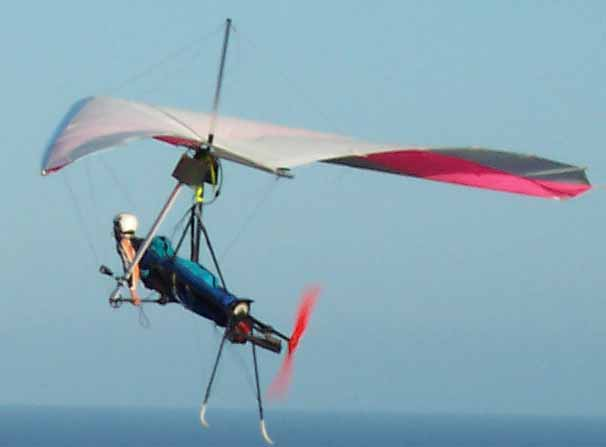
A foot-launched powered hang glider

A foot-launched powered hang glider (FLPHG), also called powered harness, nanolight, or hangmotor, is a powered hang glider harness with a motor and propeller often in pusher configuration, although some can be found in tractor configuration. An ordinary hang glider is used for its wing and control frame, and the pilot can foot-launch from a hill or from flat ground, needing a length of about a football field to get airborne, or much less if there is an oncoming breeze and no obstacles.

== History ==
=== Adding propulsion ===
While powered microlights (ultralights) developed from hang gliding in the late 1970s, they were also a return to the type of low-speed aircraft that were common in the earlier years of aviation, but which were superseded as both civil and military aircraft pursued more speed. For a second time in aviation history, during the 1970s, motorization of simple gliders, especially those portable and foot-launched, became the goal of many inventors and gradually, small wing-mounted power packs were adapted. These early experiments went largely unrecorded, even in log books, let alone the press, because the pioneers were uncomfortably aware that the addition of an engine made the craft liable to registration, airworthiness legislation, and the pilot liable to expensive licensing and probably, insurance. Inventors from Australia, France and England produced several successful microlight motor gliders in the early 1970s and very few were portable wings.

==== Don Mitchell ====
Surprisingly, what really launched the powered ultralight aviation movement in the United States was not the Rogallo flexible wing but a whole series of rigid-wing motorized hang gliders. The Icarus V flying wing appeared with its tip rudders and swept-back style wing was used as a base for some powered experiments. Differently, a rigid biplane designed also by teenager Taras Kiceniuk Jr., the Icarus II was a foundation for a modification in Larry Mauro's UFM Easy Riser biplane that started to sell in large numbers; Larry Mauro would power his tail-less biplane; one version was solar powered, called the Solar Riser. Hang gliding record holder Don Mitchell fitted his Mitchell Wing B-10 with a motor, though the pilot still had to use their legs as undercarriage, an arrangement which persisted until he designed the B-10 Mitchell Wing.

==== Barry Palmer ====
In 1963, and during his free time, aeronautical engineer Barry Palmer built and experimented with a foot-launched powered hang glider at Bloomfield, Connecticut. It was powered by a 7 hp (5 kW) West Bend engine and mounted on top of a Rogallo-type flexible wing hang glider; the propeller was 3 feet (1 m) in diameter and was made of balsa wood, covered with fiberglass and mounted in pusher configuration. However, the engine was quite underpowered and the craft could not achieve flight. It is now estimated that a modern flexible Rogallo wing hang glider requires at least 6 hp (4 kW) at the prop shaft and about 45 lbf (200 N) of thrust just to maintain level flight. During 1967, Barry Palmer built what is likely the first weight-shift powered trike aircraft.

==== John Moody ====
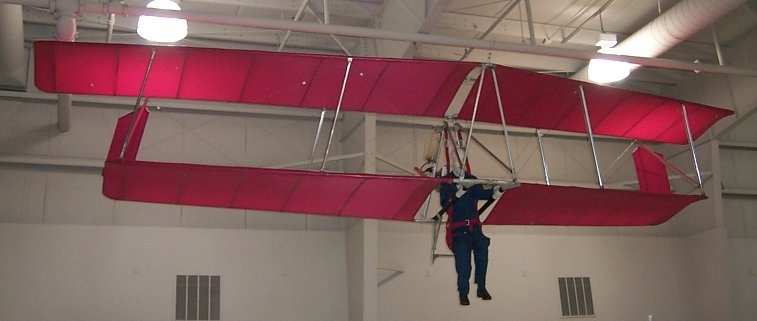
John Moody's powered Icarus II in Southeastern Wisconsin Aviation Museum

On March 15, 1975, John Moody successfully added a 12.5 hp (9 kW) West Bend engine with a 71 cm (28 in) propeller to an UFM Easy Riser biplane hang glider designed by Larry Mauro. Moody opened the throttle and ran until he lifted from the frozen surface of a lake west of Racine, Wisconsin, and he flew for 30 minutes. Then on July 27, 1976, John Moody demonstrated ultralight aviation at the annual EAA fly-in convention in Oshkosh, Wisconsin, with a foot launched McCulloch 101 powered Icarus II in front of thousands of spectators, starting the modern ultralight aviation revolution in the United States. Later, he added wheels to the aircraft and by the end of 1979, there were almost 100 competing companies selling powered ultralights (microlights) but very few were foot-launchable.

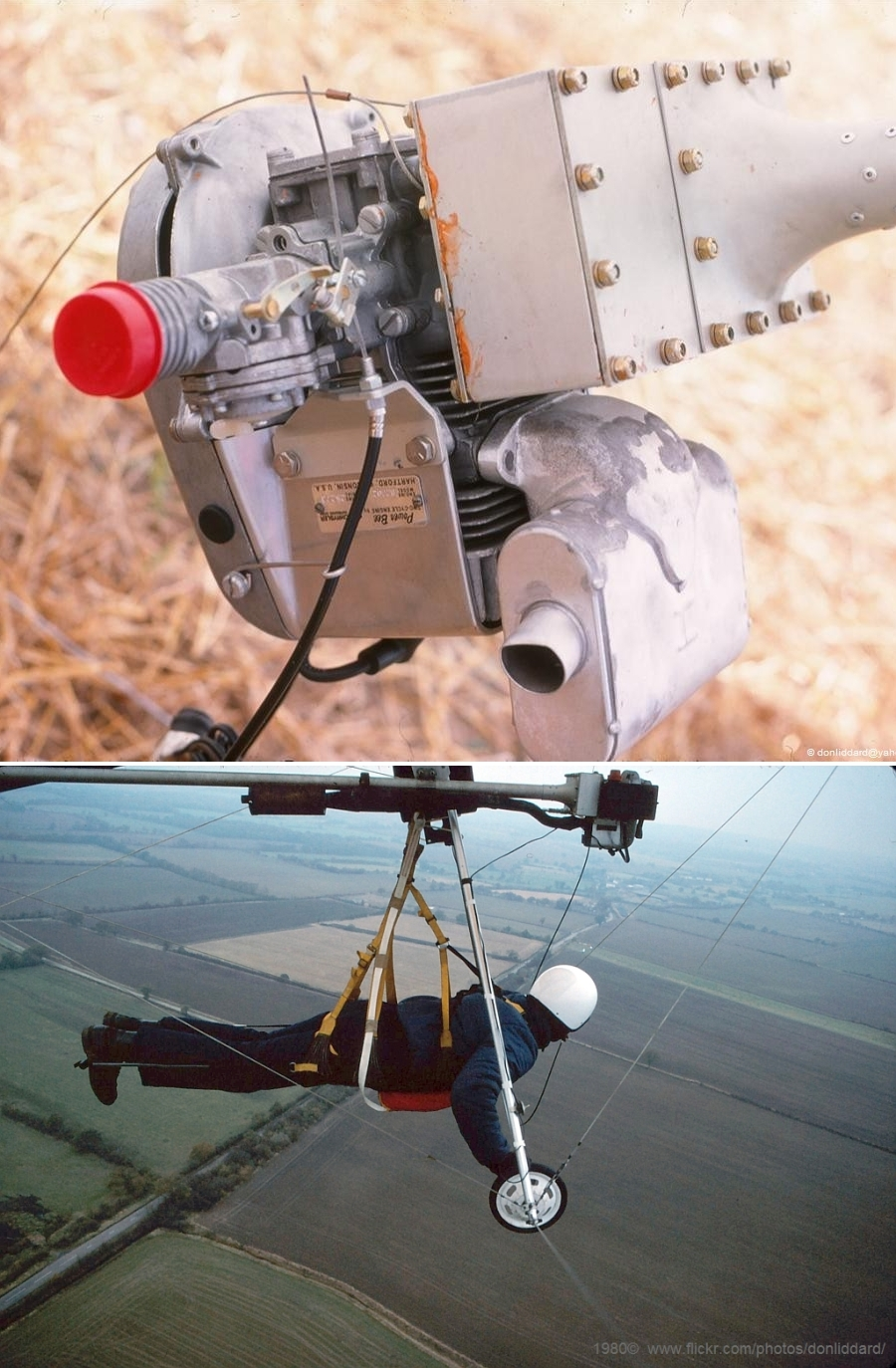
Soarmaster standard FLPHG power unit

==== Terry Sweeney ====
In 1977, Terry Sweeney developed a twintube kingpost mount for attaching an engine to a Rogallo-type flex-wing glider. He envisioned that this would enable hang gliders to make 1,000 mile flights over several days on 10 gallons of gas. However, the kingpost mount proved to be quite dangerous in turbulent conditions.

==== Jerzy Kolecki ====
In 1979, a powered backpack called the Motolotnia - White Eagle, designed by Jerzy Kolecki, became available for sale. It consisted of a 90 cc McCulloch chainsaw engine with a direct drive 61 cm (24") wooden prop, producing a quoted 77 lbf (340 N) of thrust; the rate of climb was about 150 ft/min (0.76 m/s) and flight duration was limited by the small fuel tank and engine overheating after several minutes.

Other powered harnesses to reach the market in the 1980s were The Ranger and the Relax 220.

==== Others ====
The JetBug, UK, 2003

By 2008, there were a few harness designs similar to the Swedish Aerosport Mosquito, each sporting unique strengths, and produced by other FLPHG manufacturers. The latest generation of powered harnesses bear names such as Wasp, Flylight Doodle Bug, Raven, X1, Zenon, Airtime Explorer, Fillo, and Flyped.

== World records ==
La Fédération Aéronautique Internationale (FAI) is the international standard-setting and record-keeping body for aeronautics and astronautics, so it also oversees the official records by foot-launched powered hang gliders, currently under the RWF1 category.

=== Unofficial records ===
Unofficial FLPHG World Records – Confirmed but not validated by the FAI.

- On August 5, 1978, French pioneer Bernard Danis mated a Soarmaster unit to this 168 square feet (15.6 m^{2}) SK 2SS wing and climbed to 1,825 metres (5,988 ft) above sea level at the Southern Alps.
- On May 9, 1978, David Cook became the first pilot to cross the English Channel while flying a foot-launched powered hang glider; he used a Volmer VJ-23 Swingwing glider.

Gerry Breen - London to Paris in FLPHG (August 25, 1979)

- On May 7, 1979, British pilot Gerry Breen set a new distance record for FLPHG of 325 kilometres (202 mi) from Wales to Norwich, a non-stop world distance record that still stands today; using a Soarmaster, the flight took about 4 hours with a tailwind of about 25 knots (29 mph) and reportedly consumed 25 litres (5.5 imp gal) of fuel. Three months later, on August 25 through 28, inspired by the film "Those Magnificent Men in their Flying Machines" and sponsored by British Airways, Breen flew his powered hang glider from London to Paris: Wishing to use a British made aircraft, Gerry Breen and Steve Hunt set about building with their version of the powered Soarmaster, but had no clutch. The unit, including glider, was considerably heavier than the Soarmaster and Olympus glider combination but the wing was much more robust. The hang glider was a Hiway Super Scorpion with a 10 hp (7 kW) McCulloch 125 cc engine mounted on the keel just forward of the hang strap. The journey was plagued with mechanical failures but Breen overcame them and completed the trip.
- In July 2002, Italian hang gliding champion and conservationist, Angelo d'Arrigo, guided a flock of 10 endangered western Siberian cranes, bred in captivity, with an Icaro hang glider equipped with an NRG powered harness 5,300 kilometres (3,300 mi) from the Arctic Circle in Siberia, across Kazakhstan to the shores of the Caspian Sea in Iran, avoiding Afghanistan and Pakistan where they fall victim to the abundant guns. For the most part, he relied on the sun and wind for propulsion in order to teach the young cranes to soar long distances. This $250,000 USD experiment lasted for six months and finished in winter 2002.

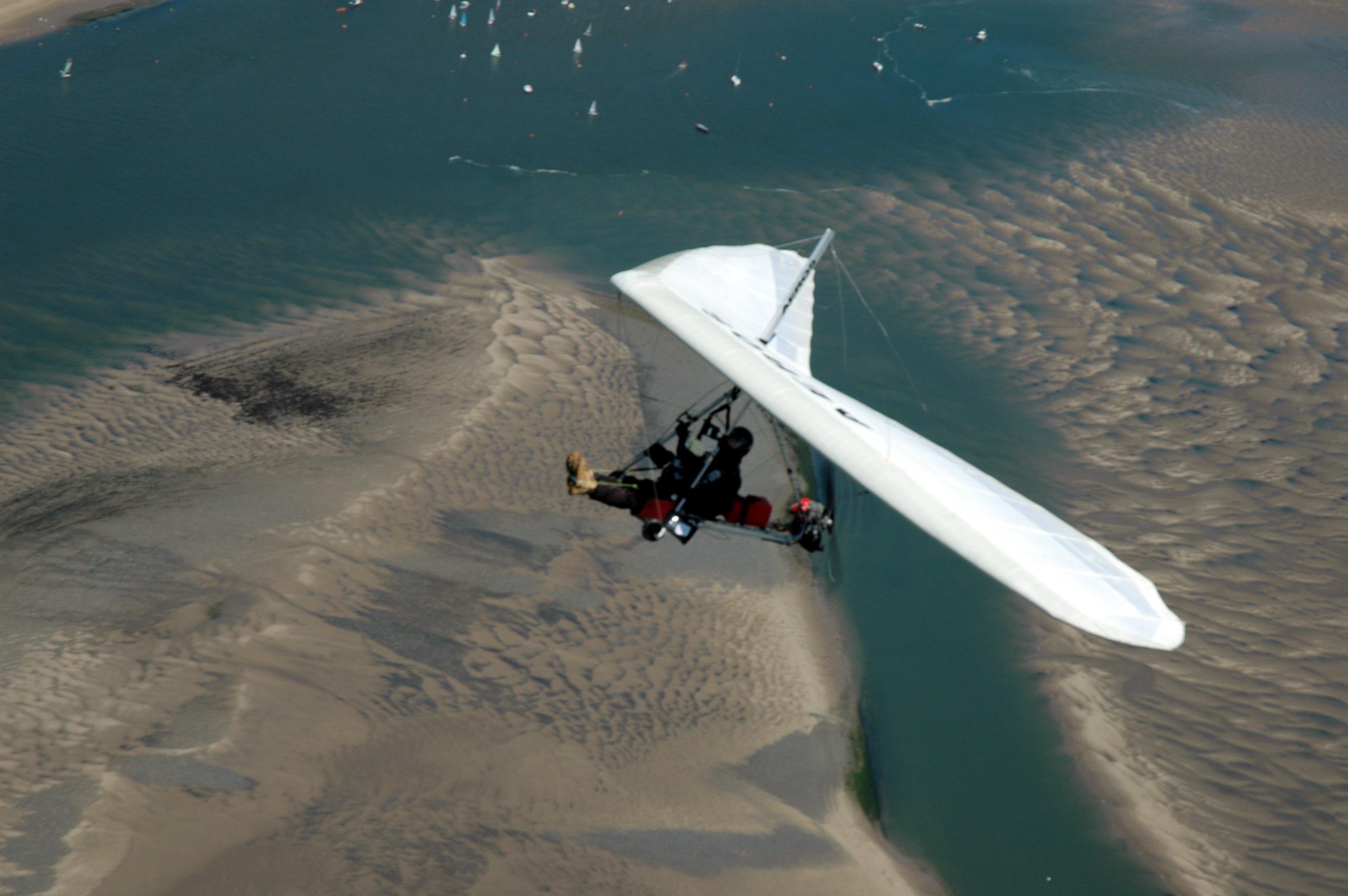
Patrick Laverty - altitude world record: 5,348 metres (17,546 ft), U.K., May 24, 2009

- On May 24, 2009, Irish pilot Patrick Laverty broke the foot-launched powered hang glider altitude world record. He used an Aeros Discus 15 hang glider coupled to a supine custom-made harness equipped with a 29 hp ROS 125 engine with the Supa-Tuna tuning lights system on a WB32 carburettor. Takeoff was at sea level and he flew to an altitude of 5,348 metres (17,546 ft) ASL over Talybont, Ceredigion, Wales, UK. He carried oxygen and 10 litres of fuel, per U.K. regulations; his variometer indicated 30 to 50fpm climb rate at the time fuel ran out.

== Systems ==
Currently, there are two harness configurations: prone (face down) and sitting. Both configurations allow the pilot to takeoff and land on their feet. Foot-launched powered hang glider (FLPHG) harnesses are built around a light metal frame with the engine and propeller mounted on the rear in a pusher configuration. Current powered harnesses weigh 22–32 kg (50-70 lb) not including the safety parachute and fuel, and fold neatly into a 1.5 metres (4.9 ft) long harness bag with a handle. Most powered harnesses in production are equipped with the Radne Raket 120 two stroke engine which is based on Husqvarna XP3120 chainsaw parts. It has a displacement of 118 cubic centimetres (7.2 cu in) and produces about 15 hp (11 kW) at 8900 RPM if equipped with a tuned exhaust; when coupled to a 1:3.5 belt-driven reduction drive and a 52" x 22" propeller, it produces about 100 lbf (440 N) of static thrust. For heavy pilots or pilots operating from higher than 1,500 metres (4,900 ft) MSL fields, a powered harness equipped with an 18 hp (13 kW) engine is recommended.

== Electric motors ==
- Richard Kruger-Sprengel (Helix Propeller) and German designer Werner Eck, have produced at least two electric powered paraglider (EPPG) prototypes
- As a result of a cooperation between Toni Roth and Jochen Geiger emerged an electric powered hang glider harness named "e-lift". It is based on a harness very much like the well known Aerosport Mosquito. Originally outfitted with a direct drive 10 kW BLDC motor, later mostly 12 kW, experimentally even 14 kW.
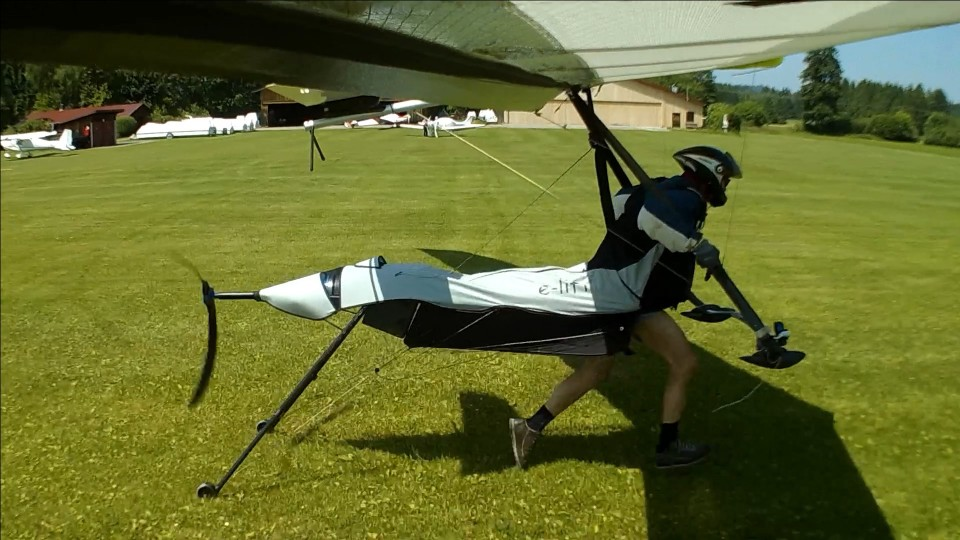
  Foot launch from airfield with active electric drive
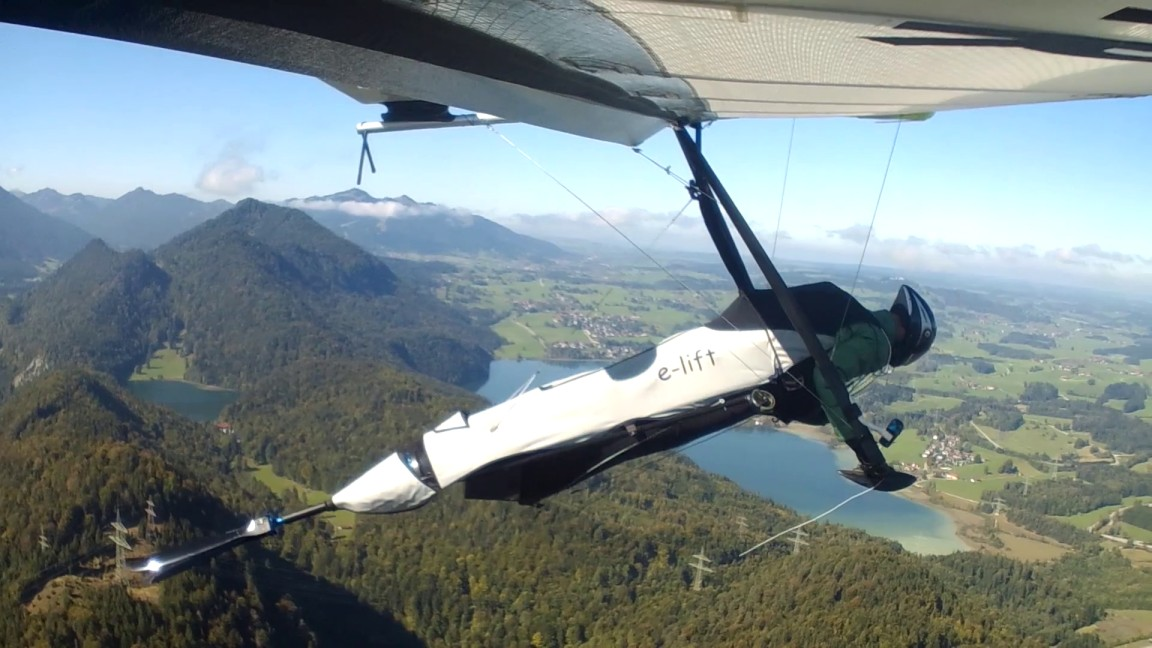
  Soaring mode, undercarriage flipped up aligned with the harness, motor off, prop folded back avoiding drag
  Equipped with up to 3 kWh of battery charge it allows for take-off, climb to around 1000 ft AGL and then hunting for thermals or other lift without motor power. The electric drive naturally can be turned off during flight and reliably turned on again when lift is absent. The charge left in the example would allow for another 30+ minutes of level flight translating into about 18+ miles to go for returning to the airfield or catch some lift elsewhere.

=== Timeline for electric-powered foot-launched gliders ===
- 1979 April 29: at Flabob Airport, California, Larry Mauro flew the Solar Riser with an electric motor powered by storage batteries charged from the sun. The Solar Riser was a modified Easy Riser hang glider.
- 2001 Richard Kruger Sprengel electric drive for paraglider.
- 2006, June 6: in Canada, Casaba Lemak takes off using an electric paraglider.
- 2006, December 19: Prototype electric paramotor from Helix-Carbon GmbH shows electric motor during the Coupe Icare in Saint Hilaire, France.
- 2007 at the German Free Flight Trade Fair in Garmisch-Partenkirchen, Werner Eck and Jochen Geiger displayed electric drives for hang gliders and paragliders.
- 2007 Razeebus Aircraft
- The E-Lift hang glider system by Toni Roth, Fronreute, Germany
- 2009 E-flight Expo displayed some electric paragliders.

== Patents ==
- US Patent 4262863 Filed: January 16, 1978. Powered hang glider with reduction drive by Charles J. Slusarczyk.
- US Patent 4417707 Filed: January 26, 1982. Human powered hang glider by Ken Leong. This type of powered hang glider is powered by the muscle exertion of the hang glider pilot. This patent references earlier teachings affecting powered hang glider design.
- US Patent 5170965 Filed: April 30, 1991. Hang glider which can fly by human strength by Hiroaki Yasuda.

== See also ==
- Glider aircraft – Aircraft designed for operation without an engine
- Hang gliding – Unpowered glider air sport
- Human powered aircraft
- Paraglider – Soaring with a paraglider
- Paragliding – Soaring with a paraglider
- Power kite – Large kite designed to provide significant pull to the user
- Powered parachute – Parachute with motor and wheels
- Powered paragliding – Form of ultralight aviation
- Ultralight aviation – Aviation field involving lightweight aircraft
- Ultralight trike – Powered hang glider

	Aerostat	Aerodyne		
	Lift: Lighter than air gas	Lift: Fixed wing	Lift: Unpowered rotor	Lift: Powered rotor
Unpowered free flight	(Free) balloon	Glider	Helicopter, etc. in autorotation	(None – see note 2)
Tethered (static or towed)	Tethered balloon	Kite	Rotor kite	(None – see note 2)
Powered	Airship	Airplane, ornithopter, etc.	Autogyro	Gyrodyne, helicopter
