= USPPA =

American non-profit organization

The United States Powered Paragliding Association (USPPA) is a non-profit organization based in the United States that endeavors to support a segment of ultralight aviation known as powered paragliding.

Founded in 2001, its primary effort is a training program with pilot ratings that recognize different levels of accomplishment. One important part is a tandem program that allows properly rated instructors to teach while flying their students on two seat paramotors.
