= Nanolight =

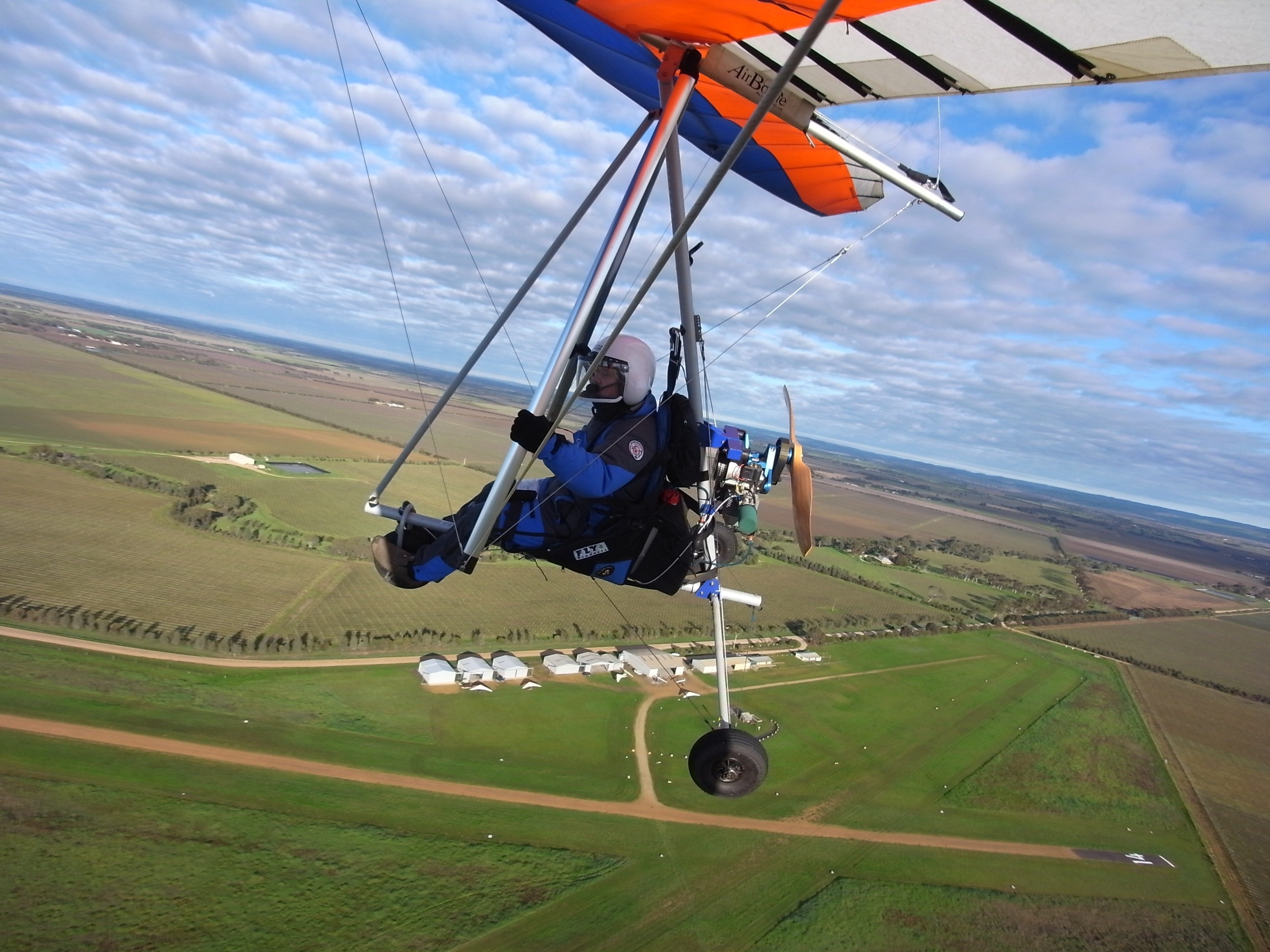
A Nanolight Trike (Fly Products Trike Delta)

A nanolight is an Australian class of ultralight powered aircraft. It was originally defined as a powered hang glider with an empty weight, including both wing and power system, of less than 70 kg (154 lb). A nanolight may be launched on foot or using a wheeled undercarriage.

Nanolights are somewhat slower than purpose-built microlights. Because they are so light, they are often used for thermal soaring. The engine is used to launch the aircraft to a safe altitude and to find a thermal. It is then turned off and the pilot uses thermal lift alone to gain altitude.

Because nanolights have good thermal performance, but low cruise speeds, this class of aircraft is most often flown by hang glider pilots who use them for soaring flights, rather than ultralight pilots using them to fly distances.

== See also ==
- Index of aviation articles
- Rogallo wing
- Rotor kite
- Homebuilt aircraft
