= Ultralight aviation =

Aviation field involving lightweight aircraft

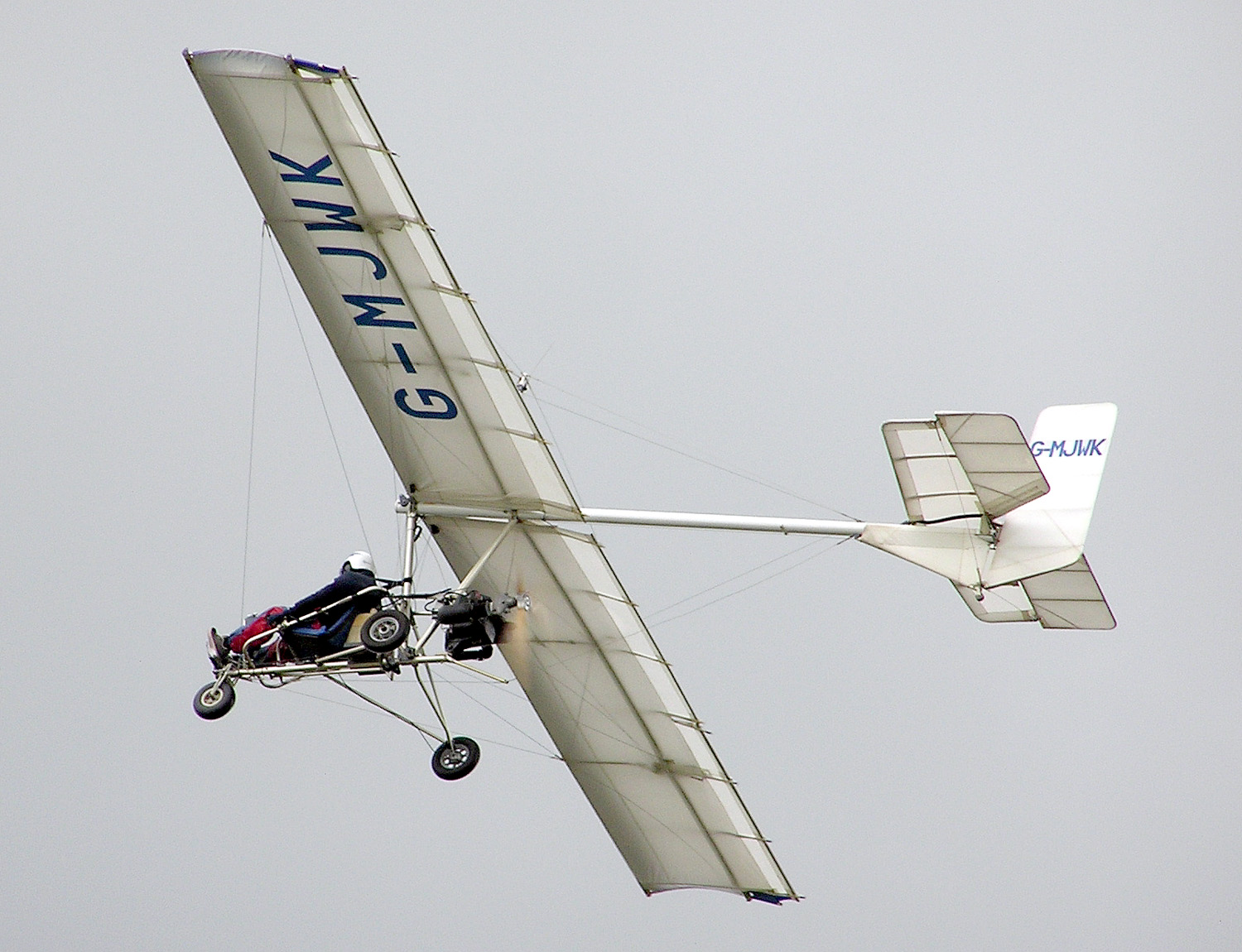
Huntair Pathfinder Mark 1 ultralight

Ultralight aviation (called Microlight aviation in some countries) is the flying of lightweight, 1- or 2-seat fixed-wing aircraft. Some countries differentiate between weight-shift control and conventional three-axis control aircraft with ailerons, elevator and rudder, calling the former "Microlight" and the latter "ultralight".

During the late 1970s and early 1980s, mostly stimulated by the hang gliding movement, many people sought affordable powered flight. As a result, many aviation authorities set up definitions of lightweight, slow-flying aeroplanes that could be subject to minimum regulations. The resulting aeroplanes are commonly called "ultralight aircraft" or "Microlights", although the weight and speed limits differ from country to country. In Europe, the sporting (FAI) definition limits the maximum stalling speed to 65 km/h (35 kn) and the maximum take-off weight to 450 kg (992 lb), or 472.5 kg (1,042 lb) if a ballistic parachute is installed. The definition means that the aircraft has a slow landing speed and short landing roll in the event of an engine failure.

In most affluent countries, Microlights or ultralight aircraft account for a significant percentage of the global civilian-owned aircraft. For instance, in Canada in February 2018, the ultralight aircraft fleet made up to 20.4% of the total civilian aircraft registered. In other countries that do not register ultralight aircraft, like the United States, their proportion of the total fleet is unknown. In countries where there is no specific extra regulation, ultralights are considered regular aircraft and subject to certification requirements for both aircraft and pilot.

== Definitions ==
Definitions of ultralight aircraft
| Country | Type | Capacity | MTOW | Time | Licence | Other conditions |
|---|---|---|---|---|---|---|
| Australia | Recreational Aircraft | 2 | 600 kg (1,323 lb); 614 kg (1,354 lb) for seaplanes | — | — | — |
| Australia | Light Sport Aircraft | 2 | 600 kg (1,323 lb); 650 kg (1,433 lb) for seaplanes | — | — | — |
| Brazil | Ultralight | 2 | 750 kg (1,653 lb) | Daylight visual conditions | — | Used mainly (or intended for) sports or recreation |
| Canada | basic ultra-light aeroplane | 2 | 1,200 lb (544 kg) | Daylight visual conditions | Ultralight Pilot Permit | Craft may be operated from land or water |
| Canada | advanced ultra-light aeroplane | 2 | 1,232 lb (559 kg) | Daylight visual conditions | Ultralight Pilot Permit | Craft may only carry a passenger if the pilot has an Ultralight Aeroplane Passenger Carrying Rating; may operate at a controlled airport without prior arrangement |
| Europe | land plane/helicopter, single-seater | 1 | 300 kg | Daylight VFR | Ultralight Pilot Permit | Sport or recreation only |
| Europe | land plane/helicopter, two-seater | 2 | 450 kg (992 lb) | Daylight VFR | Ultralight Pilot Permit | Sport or recreation only |
| Europe | amphibian or floatplane/helicopter single-seater | 2 | 495 kg (1,091 lb) | Daylight VFR | Ultralight Pilot Permit | where operating both as a floatplane/helicopter and as a land plane/ helicopter, it falls below both MTOW limits, as appropriate |
| Europe | land plane, two-seater equipped with an airframe mounted total recovery parachute system | 2 | 472.5 kg (1,042 lb) | Daylight VFR | Ultralight Pilot Permit | Sport or recreational use only |
| Europe | land plane single-seater equipped with an airframe mounted total recovery parachute system | 1 | 315 kg (694 lb) | Daylight VFR | Ultralight Pilot Permit | Sport or recreational use only |
| Europe | gyroplane | 1–2 | 560 kg (1,235 lb) | Daylight VFR | Ultralight Pilot Permit | Sport or recreational only |
| India | — | 2 | 450 kg (992 lb) without parachute | — | current permit to fly | — |
| Italy | ultraleggero | 1–2 | Max Take Off Weight MTOW 2 persons, 622.5 kg (1,372 lb) (600 kg (1,323 lb) without parachute): Hydroplanes, 650 kg (1,433 lb); Single, 300 kg (661 lb); Hydroplane single, 330 kg (728 lb); Stall speed 65 km/h (35 kn) | Daylight, minimum of 500 ft (152 m). | certificate exam, insurance and a medical examination. | Requires a helmet only for open cockpit aircraft. Flying over populated areas and assemblies of people are prohibited. |
| Japan | Ultra light power machine (undefined in Civil Aeronautics Act) | 1–2 | Max empty weight: 180 kg (397 lb) (1 seat); 225 kg (496 lb) (2 seats), with extra weight allowed for emergency parachute up to 11 kg (24 lb) and for floats up to 28 kg (62 lb) | Daylight visual conditions | Minister's permission carried on board for each year instead of licence Passengers also need permission. | Sports or recreational use only Other minister's permissions: flight permission (for each 2 – 4 months); Permission of land owner for landing and for take off; Flyable area: uncontrolled airspace over unpopulated areas, within 3 km (2 mi) from departure point and landing at another point forbidden. Aircraft: powered, non-certified, propeller aircraft, including autogyro, with landing gear; Minimum required equipment: airspeed indicator and altimeter; Maximum stall speed: 65 km/h (35 kn); Minimum wing area: 10 m (33 ft)^{2}; Maximum speed: 185 km/h (100 kn); Maximum fuel capacity: 30 L (8 US gal) |
| New Zealand | NZ Class 1 | 1 | Single seat 510 kg (1,124 lb), 550 kg (1,213 lb) for seaplanes; Stall speed 45 kn (83 km/h; 52 mph). | Daytime VFR | Microlight Licence required | Part 103 Microlight Aircraft Operating Rules, Part 103 advisory circulars |
| New Zealand | NZ Class 2 | 2 | 2 Seats 600 kg (1,323 lb), 650 kg (1,433 lb) for seaplanes; Stall speed 45 kn (83 km/h; 52 mph) | Daytime VFR | Microlight Licence required | Part 103 Microlight Aircraft Operating Rules, Part 103 advisory circulars |
| Philippines | non-type certified aircraft | — | — | Daytime VFR | — | recreational and sport use |
| United Kingdom | Sub-70 kg (154 lb) Unregulated, Single seat deregulated, 2-seat regulated. | 1–2 | Several definitions, from 70 kg with full fuel to 650 kg (1,433 lb) maximum weight at take-off | Daytime VFR | Licence not required for Sub-70 kg, NPPL licence required otherwise | Recreational. No paid work. |
| United States | ultralight aircraft | 1 | Empty weight of less than 254 lb (115 kg) | Daylight hours | no license required | less than 5 US gal (19 L) fuel capacity, empty weight of less than 254 pounds, a top speed of 55 kn (63 mph; 102 km/h), and a maximum stall speed not exceeding (24 kn (28 mph; 44 km/h)). May only be flown over uncongested areas. |
| United States | light-sport aircraft | 2 | 1,320 lb (599 kg); 1,430 lb (649 kg) for seaplanes. | Daytime VFR | sport pilot certificate | Max. Speed (CAS) in Level Flight 138 mph (120 kn; 222 km/h); Max. Stall Speed 51 mph (44 kn; 82 km/h); Must have fixed landing gear, and a single engine with fixed pitch propeller. |

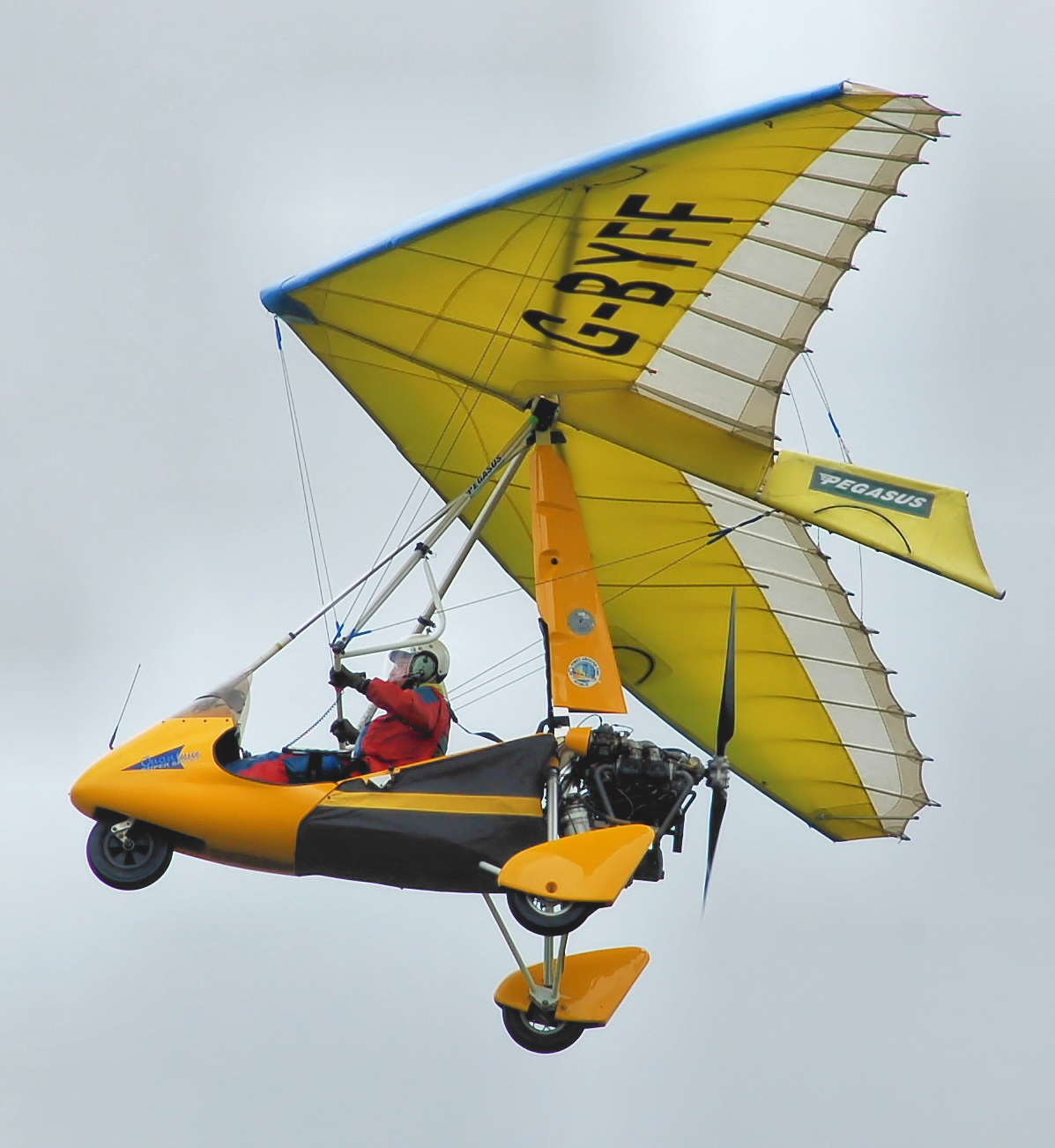
Pegasus Quantum 145-912 ultralight trike

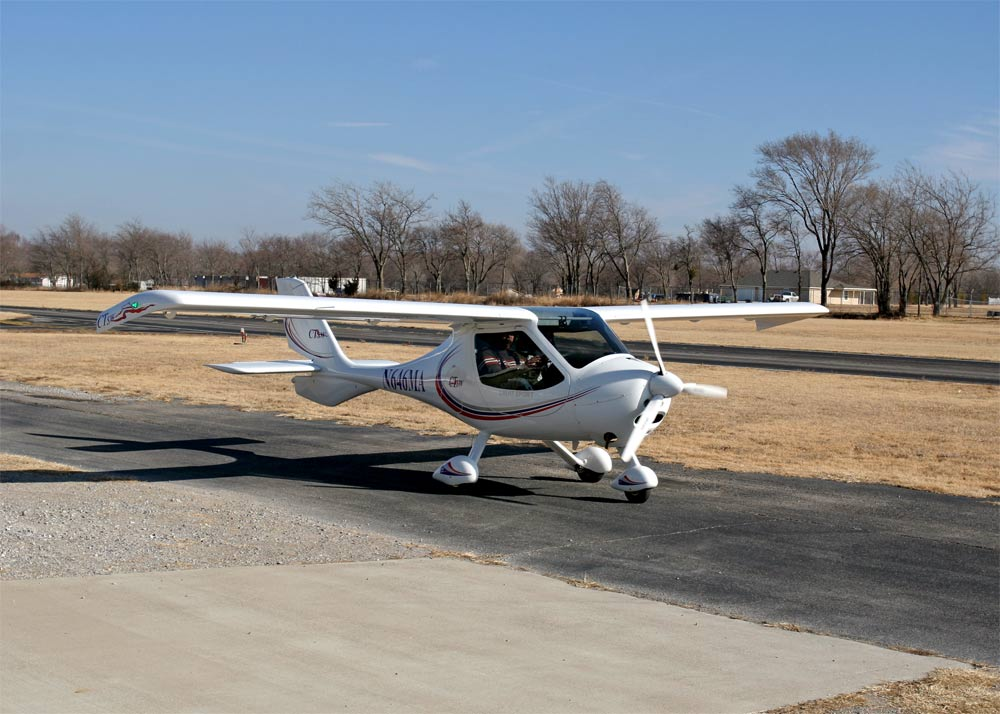
Flight Design CTSW

A powered paraglider

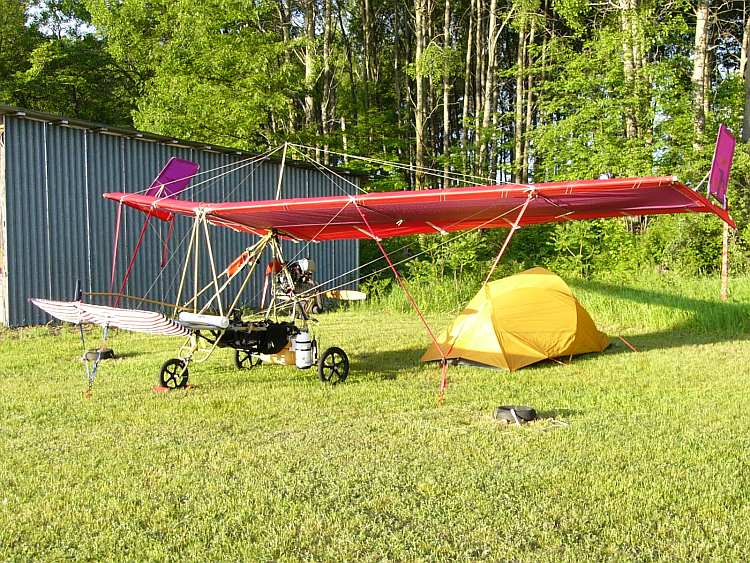
A US-made Pterodactyl Ascender ultralight on a camping flight

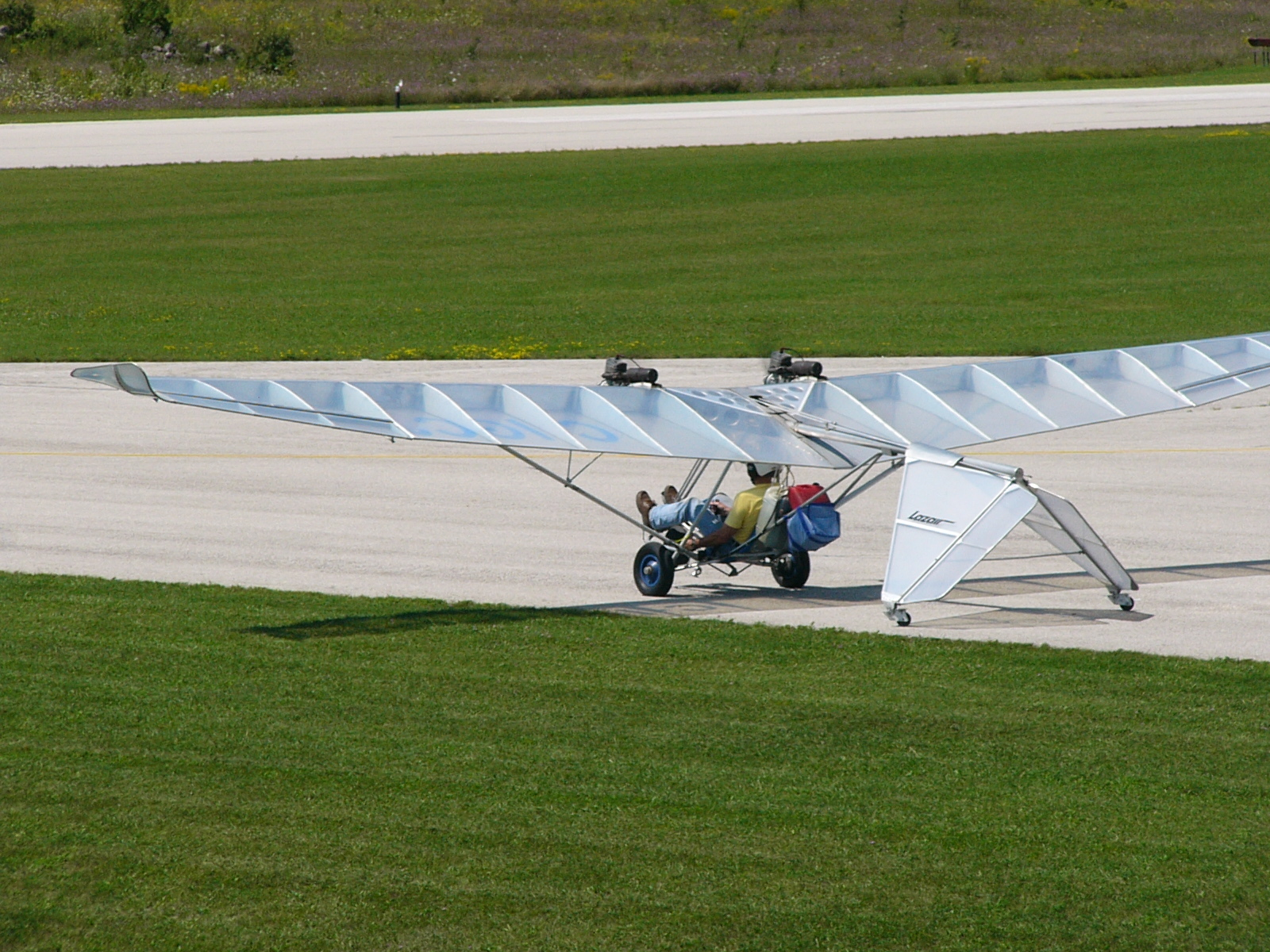
Canadian Lazair ultralight covered in clear Mylar

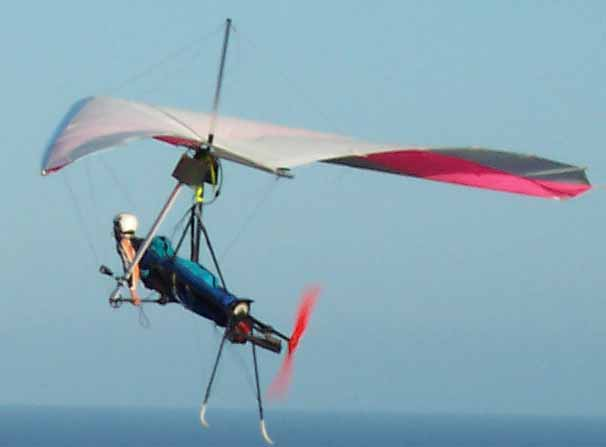
A foot-launched powered hang glider

=== Australia ===
In Australia, ultralight aircraft and their pilots can either be registered with the Hang Gliding Federation of Australia (HGFA) or Recreational Aviation Australia (RA Aus). In all cases, except for privately built single seat ultralight aeroplanes, microlight aircraft or trikes are regulated by the Civil Aviation Regulations.

=== United Kingdom ===
Pilots of a powered, fixed wing aircraft or paramotors do not need a licence, provided its weight with a full fuel tank is not more than 75 kg (165 lb), but they must obey the rules of the air.

For heavier microlights the current UK regulations are similar to the European ones, but helicopters and gyroplanes are not included.

Other than the very earliest aircraft, all two-seat UK microlights (and until 2007 all single-seaters) have been required to meet an airworthiness standard; BCAR Section S. In 2007, Single Seat DeRegulated (SSDR), a sub-category of single seat aircraft was introduced, allowing owners more freedom for modification and experiments. By 2017 the airworthiness of all single seat microlights became solely the responsibility of the user, but pilots must hold a microlight licence; currently NPPL(M) (National Private Pilots Licence).

=== New Zealand ===
Ultralights in New Zealand are subject to NZCAA General Aviation regulations with microlight specific variations as described in Part 103 and AC103-1.

=== United States ===
The United States FAA's definition of an ultralight is significantly different from that in most other countries and can lead to some confusion when discussing the topic. The governing regulation in the United States is FAR 103 Ultralight Vehicles. In 2004, the FAA introduced the "Light-sport aircraft" category, which resembles some other countries' microlight categories. Ultralight aviation is represented by the United States Ultralight Association (USUA), which acts as the US aeroclub representative to the Fédération Aéronautique Internationale.

== Types ==
There are several categories of aircraft which qualify as ultralights in some countries:

- Fixed-wing aircraft: traditional airplane-style designs.
- Weight-shift control trike: use a hang glider-style wing, below which is suspended a three-wheeled carriage which carries the engine and aviators. These aircraft are controlled by pushing against a horizontal control bar in roughly the same way as a hang glider pilot flies.
- Powered parachute: fuselage-mounted engines with parafoil wings, which are wheeled aircraft.
- Powered paraglider: backpack engines with parafoil wings, which are foot-launched.
- Powered hang glider: motorized foot-launched hang glider harness.
- Autogyro: rotary wing with fuselage-mounted engine, a gyrocopter is different from a helicopter in that the rotating wing is not powered, the engine provides forward thrust and the airflow through the rotary blades causes them to autorotate or "spin up" thereby creating lift.
- Helicopter: there are a number of single-seat and two-place helicopters which fall under the microlight categories in countries such as New Zealand. However, few helicopter designs fall within the more restrictive ultralight category defined in the United States of America.
- Hot air balloon: there are numerous ultralight hot air balloons in the US, and several more have been built and flown in France and Australia in recent years. Some ultralight hot air balloons are hopper balloons, while others are regular hot air balloons that carry passengers in a basket.

=== Electric ===
Advancements in batteries, motors, and motor controllers has led to some practical production electric propulsion systems for some ultralight applications. In many ways, ultralights are a good application for electric power as some models are capable of flying with low power, which allows longer duration flights on battery power.

In 2007, the first pioneering company in this field, the Electric Aircraft Corporation, began offering engine kits to convert ultralight weight shift trikes to electric power. The 18 hp motor weighs 26 lb (12 kg) and an efficiency of 90% is claimed by designer Randall Fishman. The battery consists of a lithium-polymer battery pack of 5.6 kWh which provides 1.5 hours of flying in the trike application. The company claimed a flight recharge cost of 60 cents in 2007.

A significant obstacle to the adoption of electric propulsion for ultralights in the U.S. is the weight of the battery, which is considered part of the empty weight of the aircraft despite efforts to have it considered as fuel. As the specific energy of batteries improves, lighter batteries can be used.

== See also ==
- Aerosport (airshow)
- Backpack helicopter
- Jetpack
- Nanolight
- Experimental Aircraft Association
- Recreational Aviation Australia
- United States Ultralight Association
- United States Powered Paragliding Association
- Volksflugzeug
