= United States Hang Gliding and Paragliding Association =

Non-profit organization

The United States Hang Gliding and Paragliding Association (USHPA) is a non-profit organization supporting foot-launched soaring flight in the United States. It began in 1971 as the Southern California Hang Gliding Association and became national in scope by the mid-1970s. When paragliding became popular in the U.S., the American Paragliding Association was formed. That eventually merged into the USHPA (then called the U.S. Hang Gliding Association). In 2006, paragliding was added to the organization name to reflect its growing contingent of paraglider pilot members.

USHPA is the Fédération Aéronautique Internationale–recognized body representing motorless hang gliding and paragliding competitions and records in the United States.

The organization provides a pilot proficiency program for foot-launched soaring pilots and instructors. It is available at the organization's website.
