= List of inflatable manufactured goods =

Links to Wikipedia articles on notable classes of inflatable goods

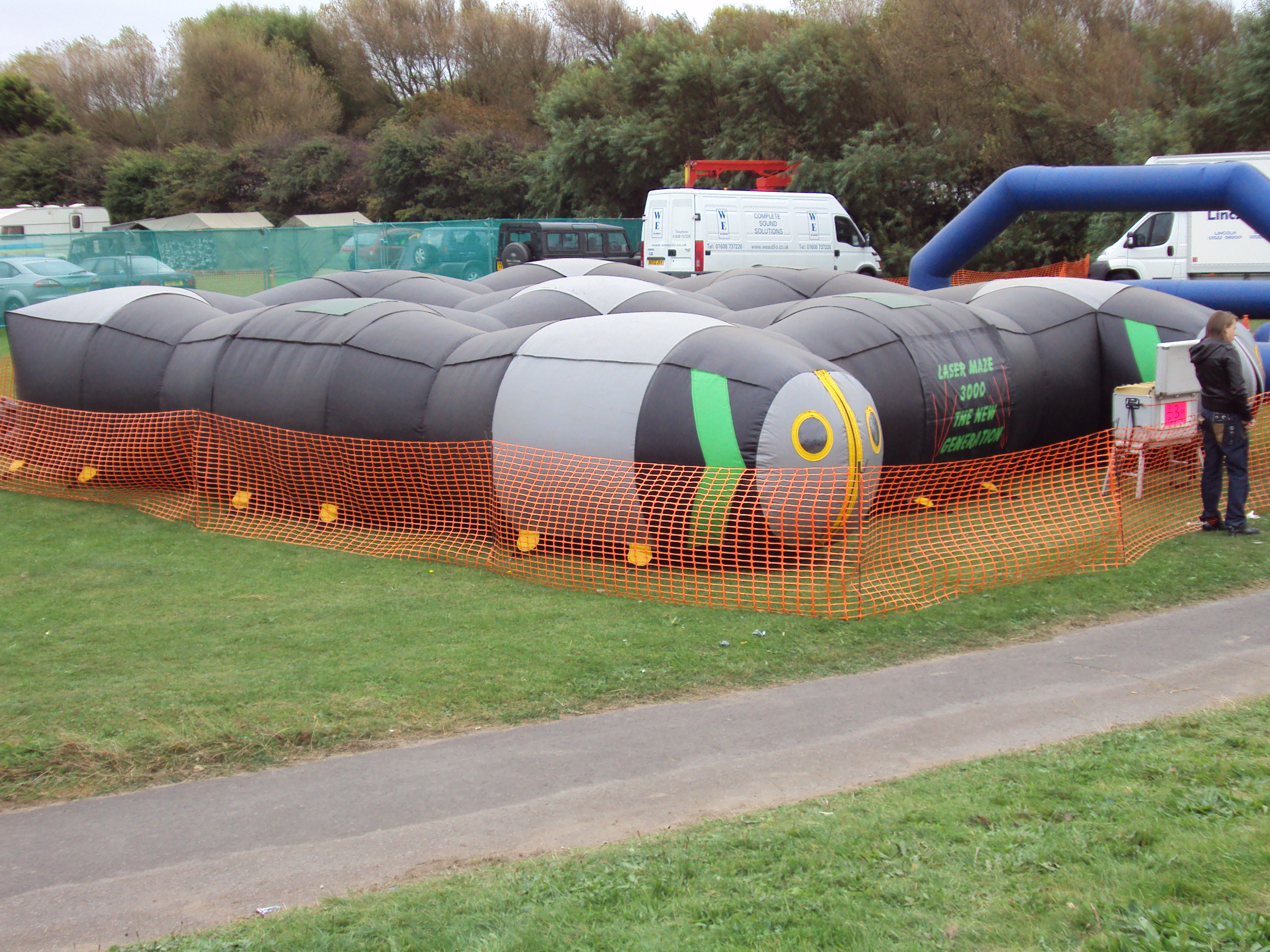
An inflatable laser maze

This is a non-comprehensive list of inflatable manufactured goods, as no such list could ever completely contain all items that regularly change. An inflatable is an object that can typically be inflated with a gas, including air, hydrogen, helium and nitrogen. Some can be inflated with liquids, such as waterbeds and water balloons.

== Inflatable manufactured goods ==
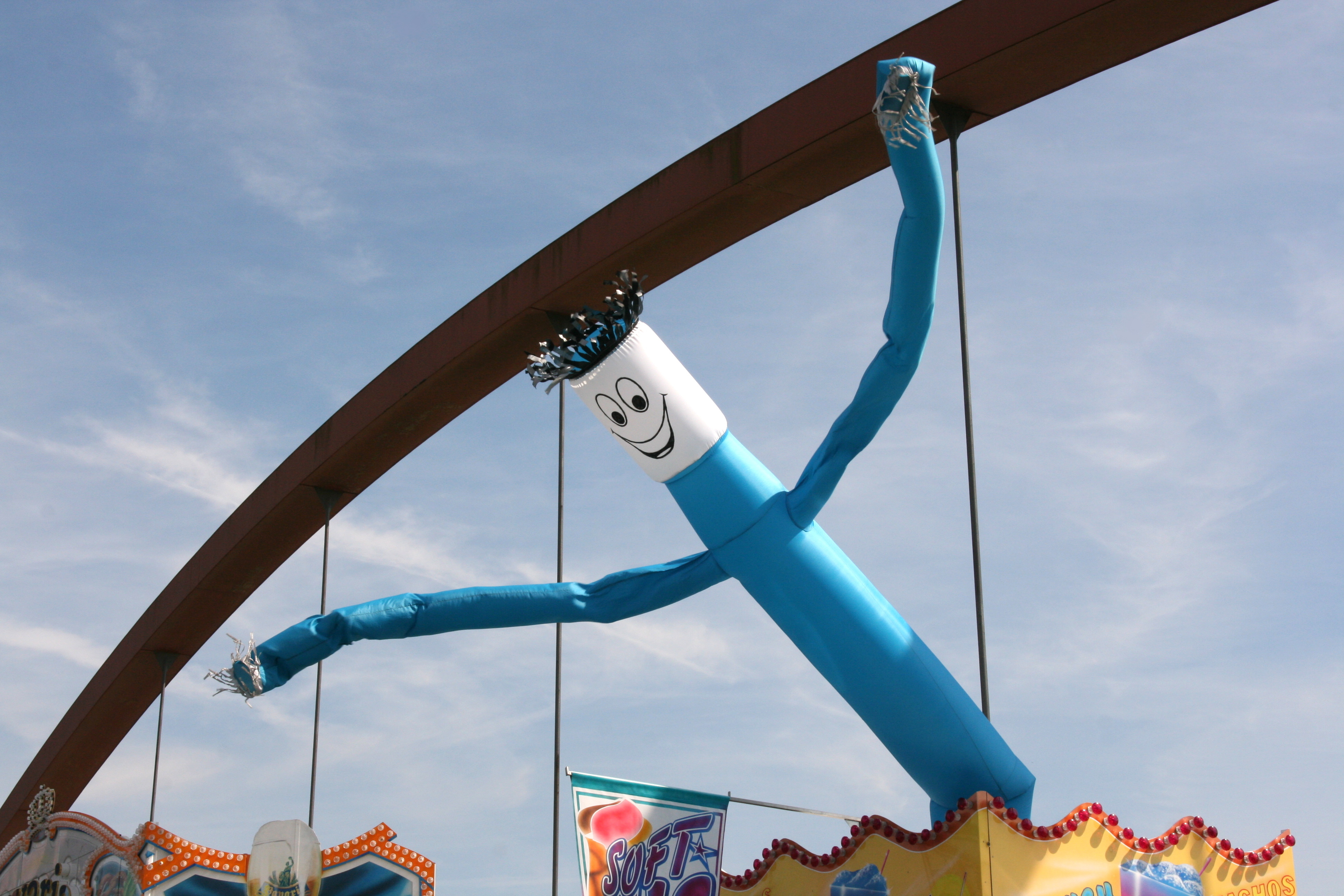
A tube man

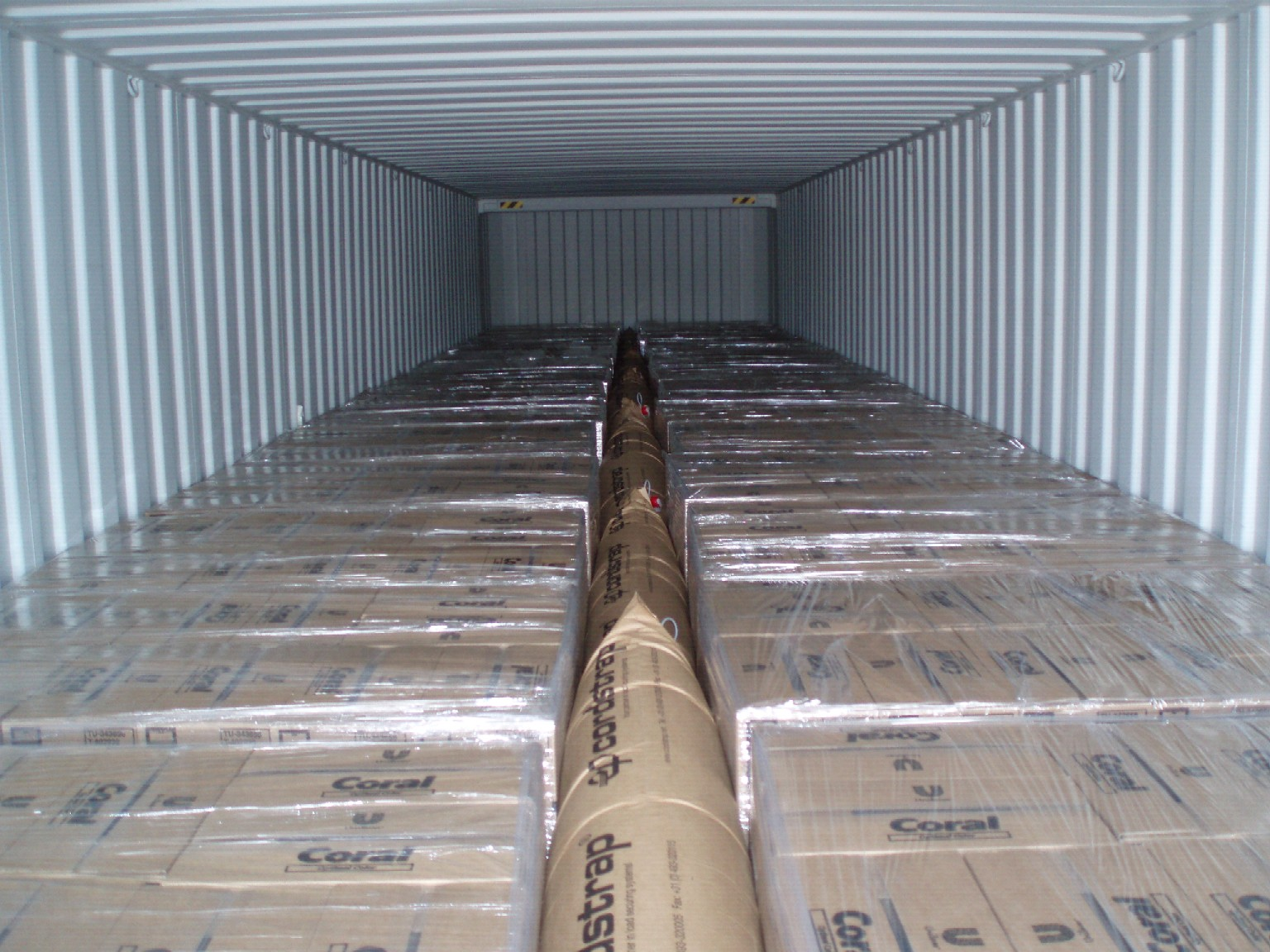
Dunnage bags (center) being used to stabilize products in a shipping container

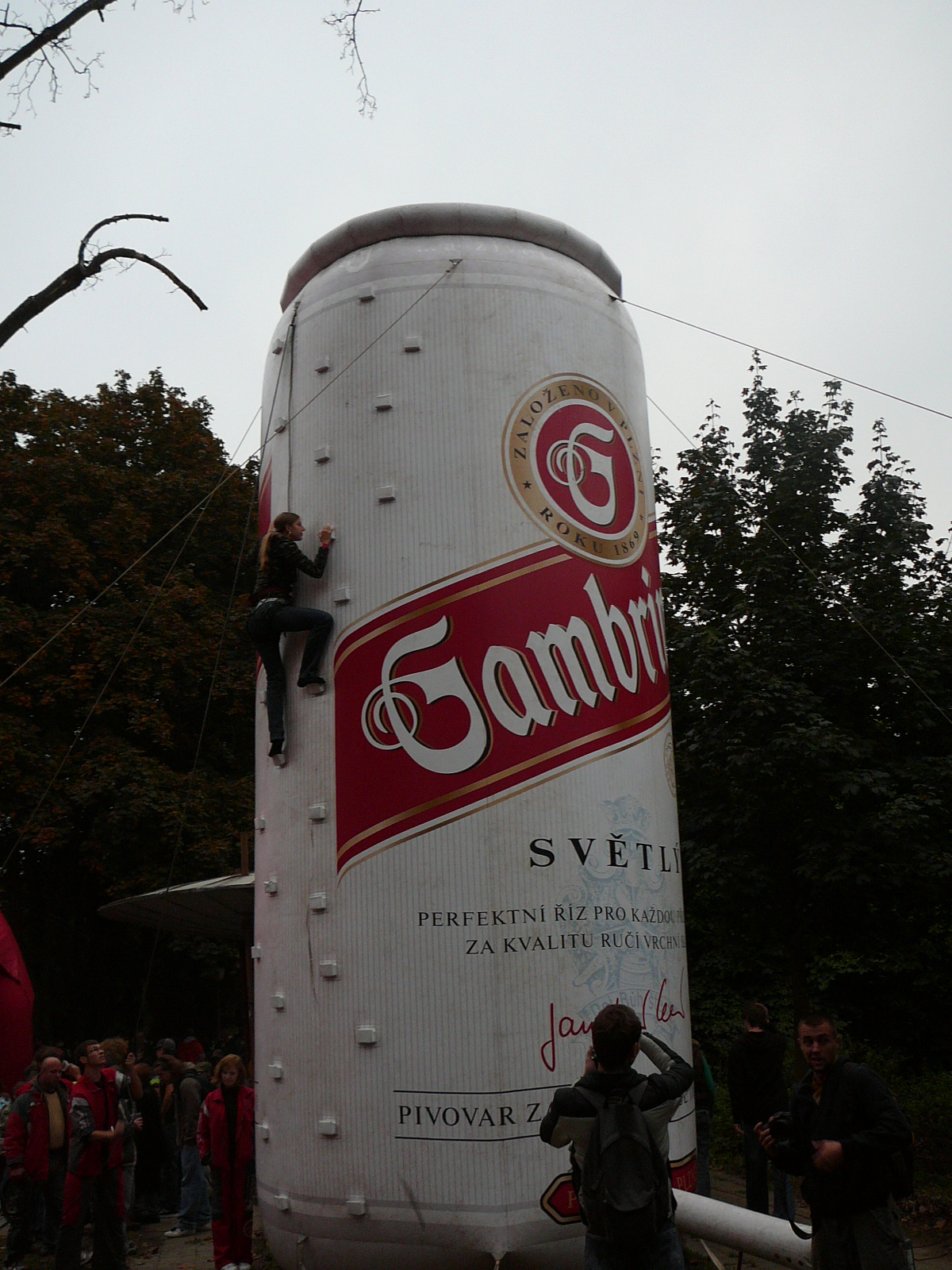
A Gambrinus inflatable structure with a climbing wall

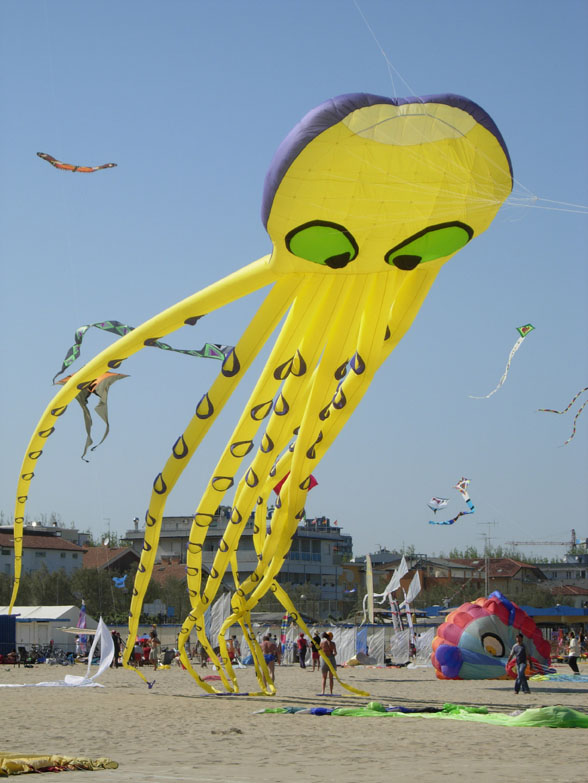
A 27m Peter Lynn Octopus kite flown at Cervia International Kite Festival, Italy 2007

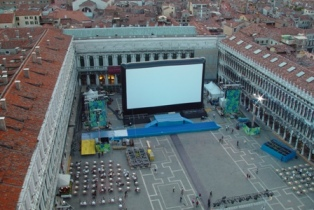
Outdoor movies shown on an airscreen or inflatable movie screen

=== A ===
- Airbag
- Air cushion
- Air mattress
- Air-supported structure
- Air Swimmer
- Arch
- Armband (swimming aid)

=== B ===
- Balloon

- Balloon helicopter
- Balloon rocket
- Balloon tank (for rockets)
- Thundersticks
- Toy balloon
- Water balloon

- Balloon (aircraft)
- Balls

- Basketball
- Beach ball
- Cage ball
- Exercise ball
- Football (ball)

- Football, also known as a soccer ball
- Football, the ball used in American football
- One world futbol
- Penny floater

- Rugby ball
- Skyball
- Team handball
- Volleyball
- Water polo ball

- Barrage balloon
- Billboard
- Boat

- Arancia class lifeboat
- Combat Rubber Raiding Craft
- Cutter Boat – Over the Horizon
- D class lifeboat (EA16)
- D class lifeboat (IB1)
- Halkett boat
- Inflatable rescue boat
- LCRL
- LCRS
- Rigid-hulled inflatable boat
- ULYZ
- X class lifeboat
- XP class lifeboat
- Y class lifeboat

- Bubble wrap
- Building

- Space habitat

- Buoyancy compensator (scuba diving)

=== C ===
- Castle
- Costume

=== D ===
- Delayed surface marker buoy
- Dunnage bag, also known as airbags

=== G ===
- Gamow bag, primarily used for treating severe cases of altitude sickness
- Goodyear Inflatoplane

=== I ===
- Inflatable
- Inner tubes

=== K ===
- Kamifūsen
- Kayak
- Kite

- Inflatable single-line kite
- Leading edge inflatable kite

- Kytoon

=== M ===
- Medical devices

- Adjustable gastric band
- Artificial lung
- Balloon catheter

- Movie screen

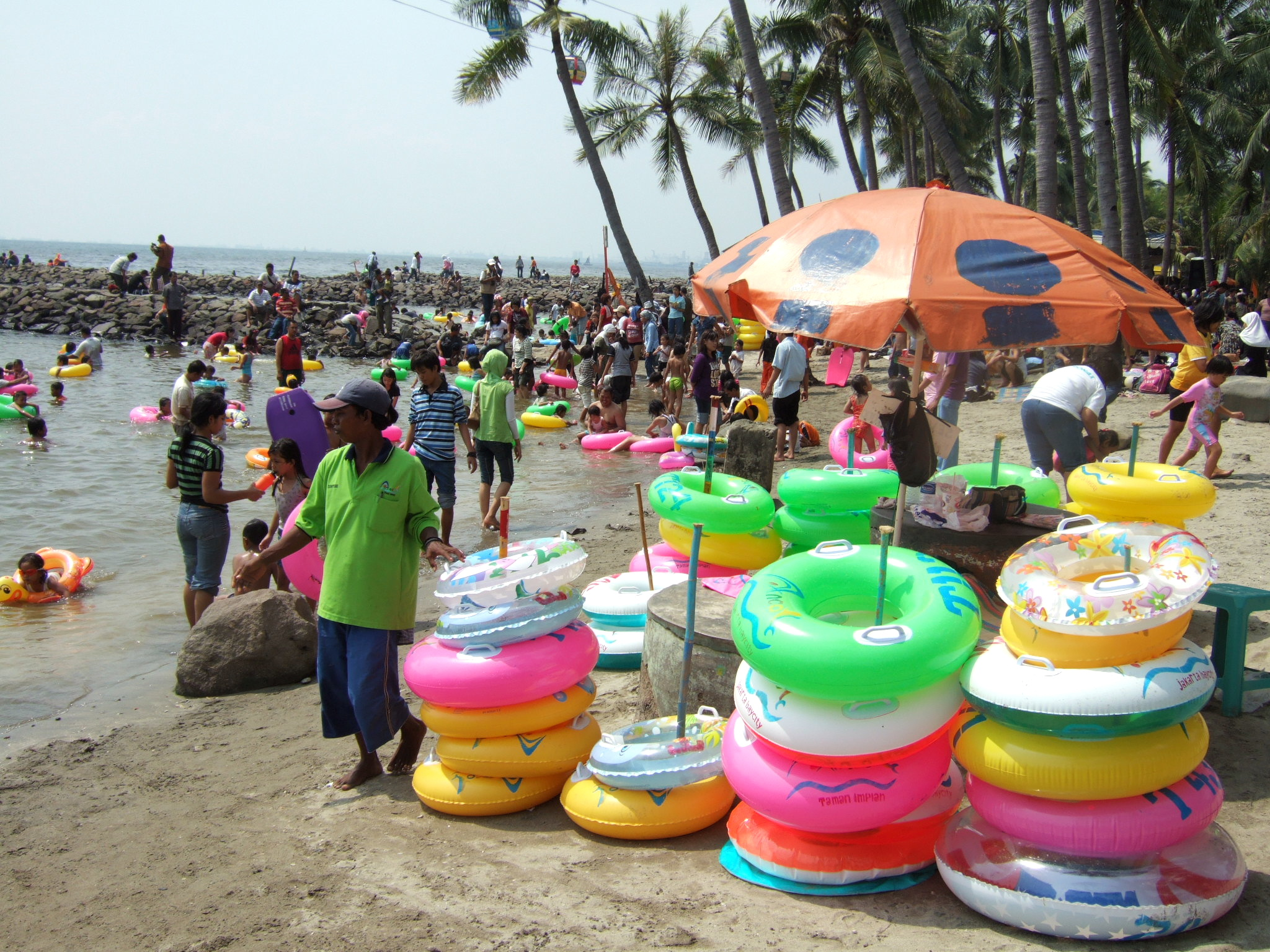
Inflatable swim rings

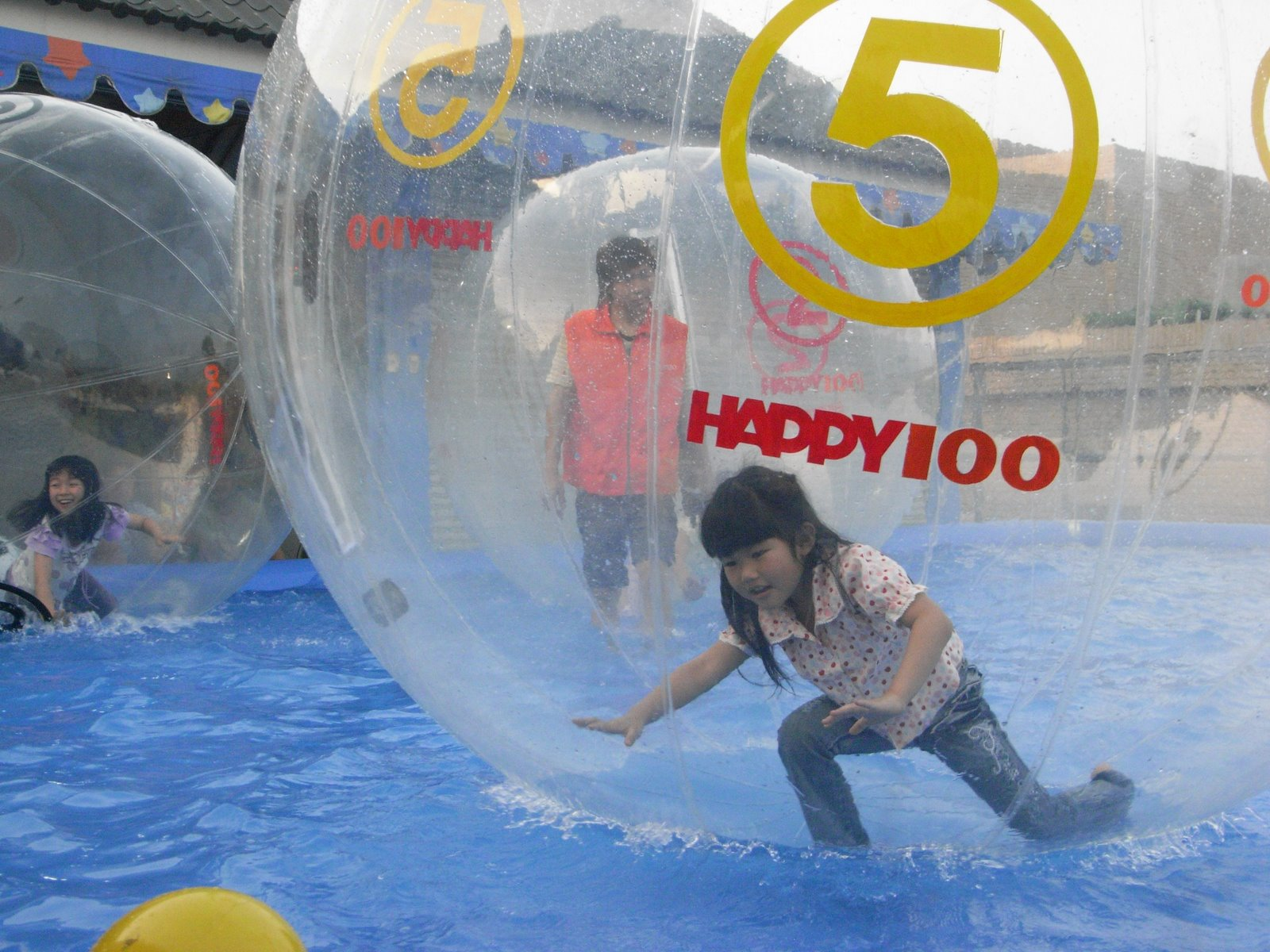
Children playing in water balls in Kaohsiung, Taiwan

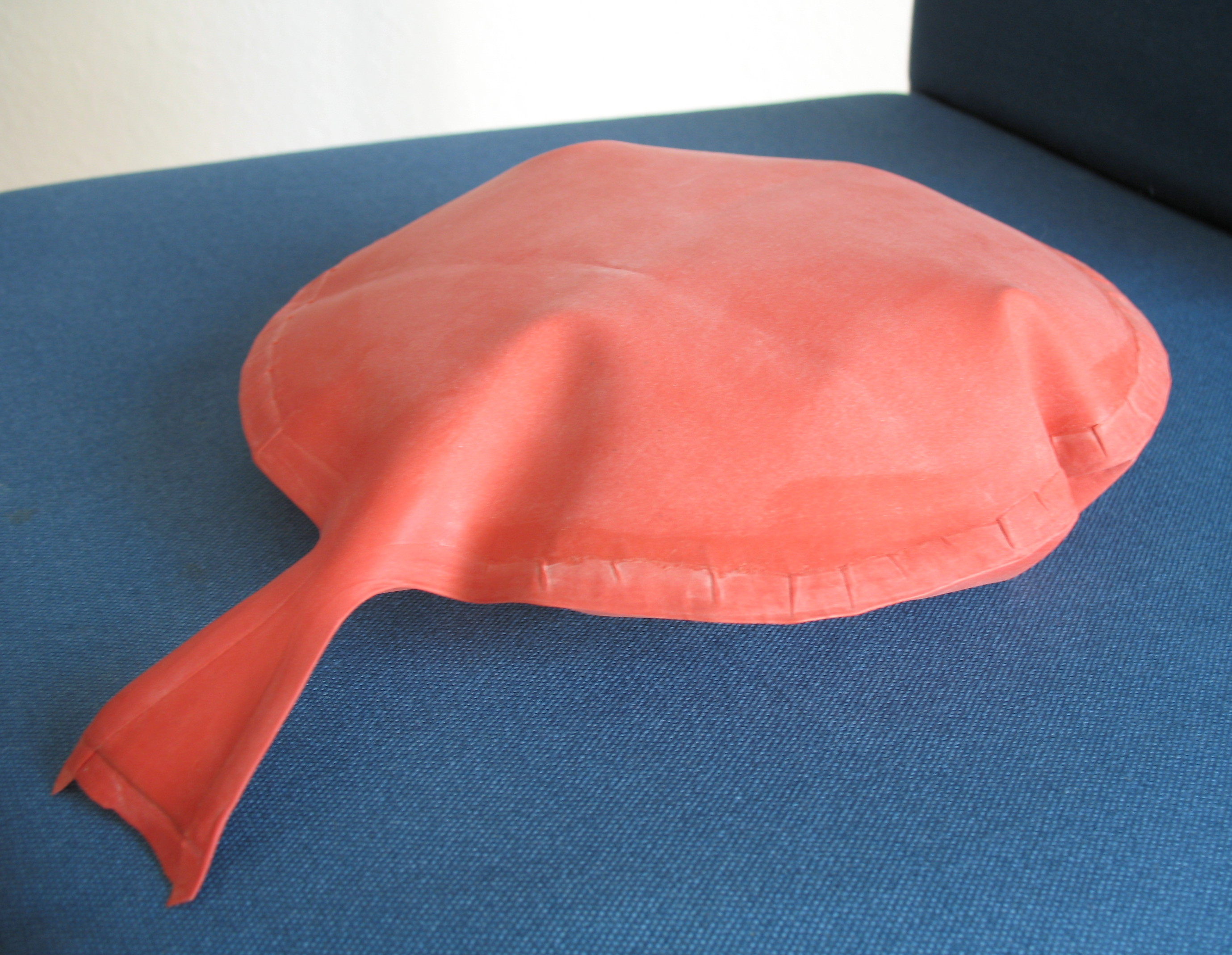
Whoopee cushion

=== P ===
- Personal flotation device – some are inflated with air or from carbon dioxide gas canisters
- Pneumatic bladder
- Pool

=== R ===
- Rat
- Rubber dam

=== S ===
- Safety belt
- Sex doll
- Space hopper
- Survival suit
- Swim ring
- Sleeping pad

=== T ===
- Tent, some tents have inflatable pole supports (airbeams)
- Tire (Category:Tires)
- Tube man
- Tunnel

=== W ===
- Water ball
- Waterbed
- Water slide
- Whoopee cushion

=== Z ===
- Zeppelin
