= Inflatable =

Object filled with pressurized gas to maintain its size and shape

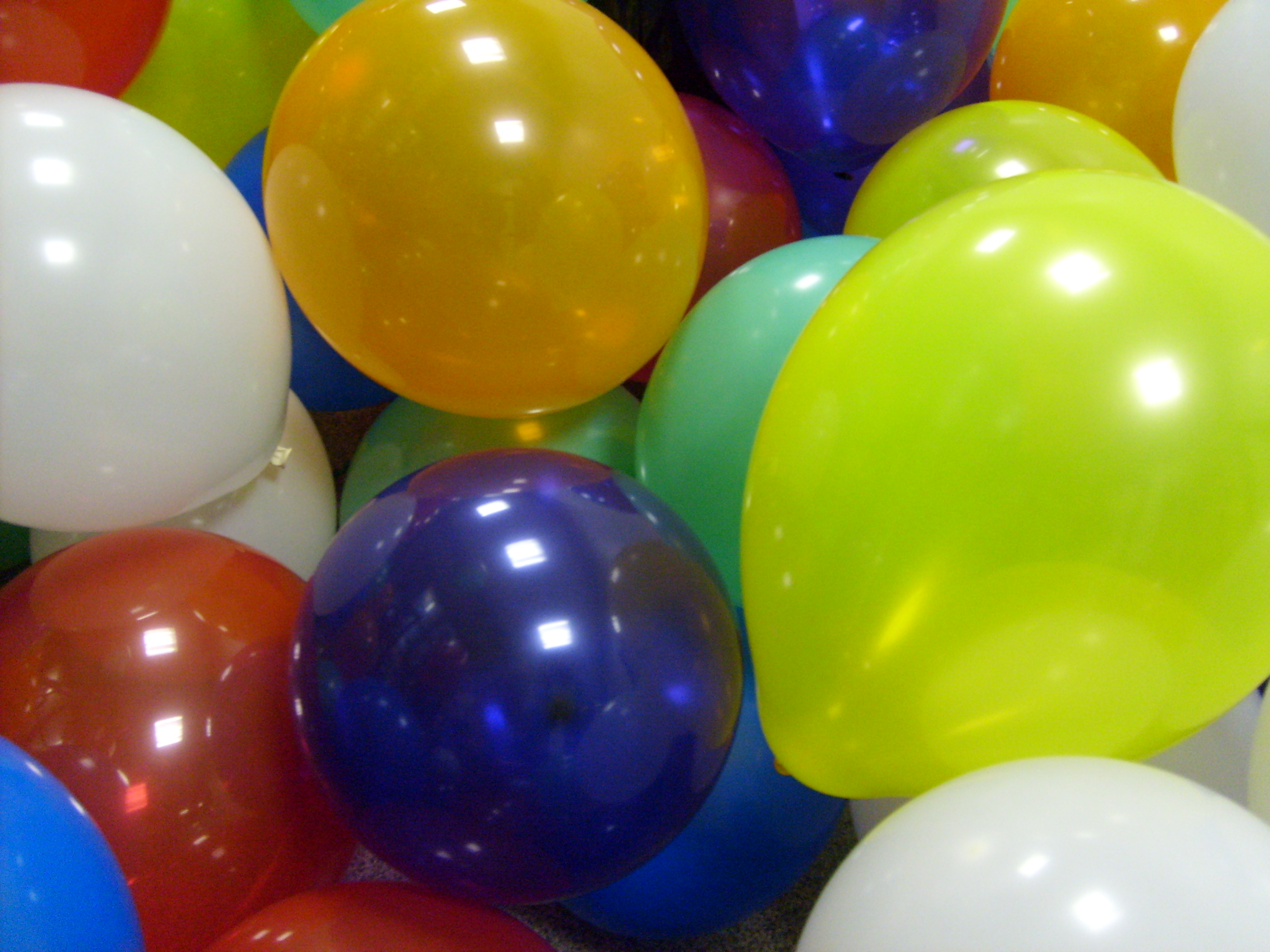
Balloons are the most common type of inflatable.

An inflatable is an object that can be inflated with a gas, usually with air, but hydrogen, helium, and nitrogen are also used. One of several advantages of an inflatable is that it can be stored in a small space when not inflated, since inflatables depend on the presence of a gas to maintain their size and shape. Function fulfillment per mass used compared with non-inflatable strategies is a key advantage. Stadium cushions, impact guards, vehicle wheel inner tubes, emergency air bags, and inflatable space habitats employ the inflatable principle. Inflation occurs through several strategies: pumps, ram-air, blowing, and suction.

Although the term inflatable can refer to any type of inflatable object, the term is often used in boating to specifically refer to inflatable boats.

== Types ==
=== High-pressure vs. low-pressure ===
A distinction is made between high-pressure and low-pressure inflatables. In a high-pressure inflatable, structural limbs like pillars and arches are built out of a tough, flexible material and then inflated at a relatively high pressure. These limbs hold up passive membranes. The space where the visitors or inhabitants stay is under normal atmospheric pressure. For example, airplane emergency rafts are high-pressure inflatable structures. Low-pressure inflatables, on the other hand, are slightly pressurized environments completely held up by internal pressure. In other words, the visitors or inhabitants experience a slightly higher than normal pressure. Low-pressure inflatables are usually built of lighter materials. Both types of inflatables (the low-pressure type more so) are somewhat susceptible to high winds.

=== By use ===
==== Balloon ====
A balloon is an inflatable flexible filled with air and also gas, such as helium, hydrogen, nitrous oxide or oxygen. Modern balloons can be made from materials such as latex rubber, polychloroprene, or a nylon fabric, while some early balloons were made of dried animal bladders. Latex rubber balloons may be used as inexpensive children's toys or decorations, while others are used for practical purposes such as meteorology, medical treatment, military defense, or transportation. A balloon's properties, including its low density and low cost, have led to a wide range of applications. The inventor of the natural latex rubber balloon, (the most common balloon) was Michael Faraday in 1824, via experiments with air and various gases.

==== Inflatable castles ====
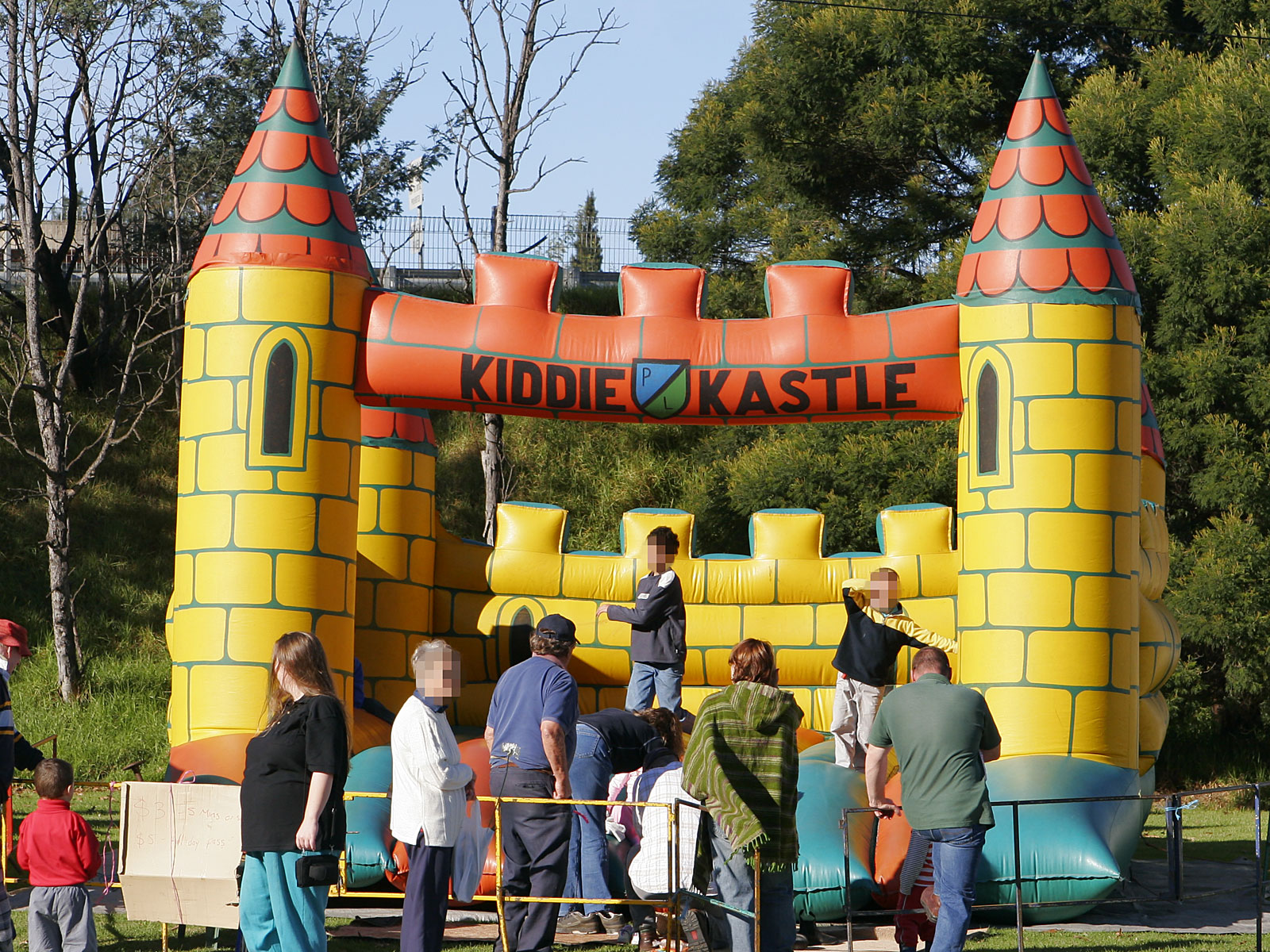
An inflatable castle type of moonwalk.

Inflatable castles and similar structures are temporary inflatable buildings and structures that are rented for functions, school and church festivals and village fetes and used for recreational purposes, mainly by children. The growth in popularity of moonwalks has led to an inflatable rental industry which includes inflatable slides, obstacle courses, games, and more. Inflatables are ideal for portable amusements because they are easy to transport and store.

==== Inflatable boat ====
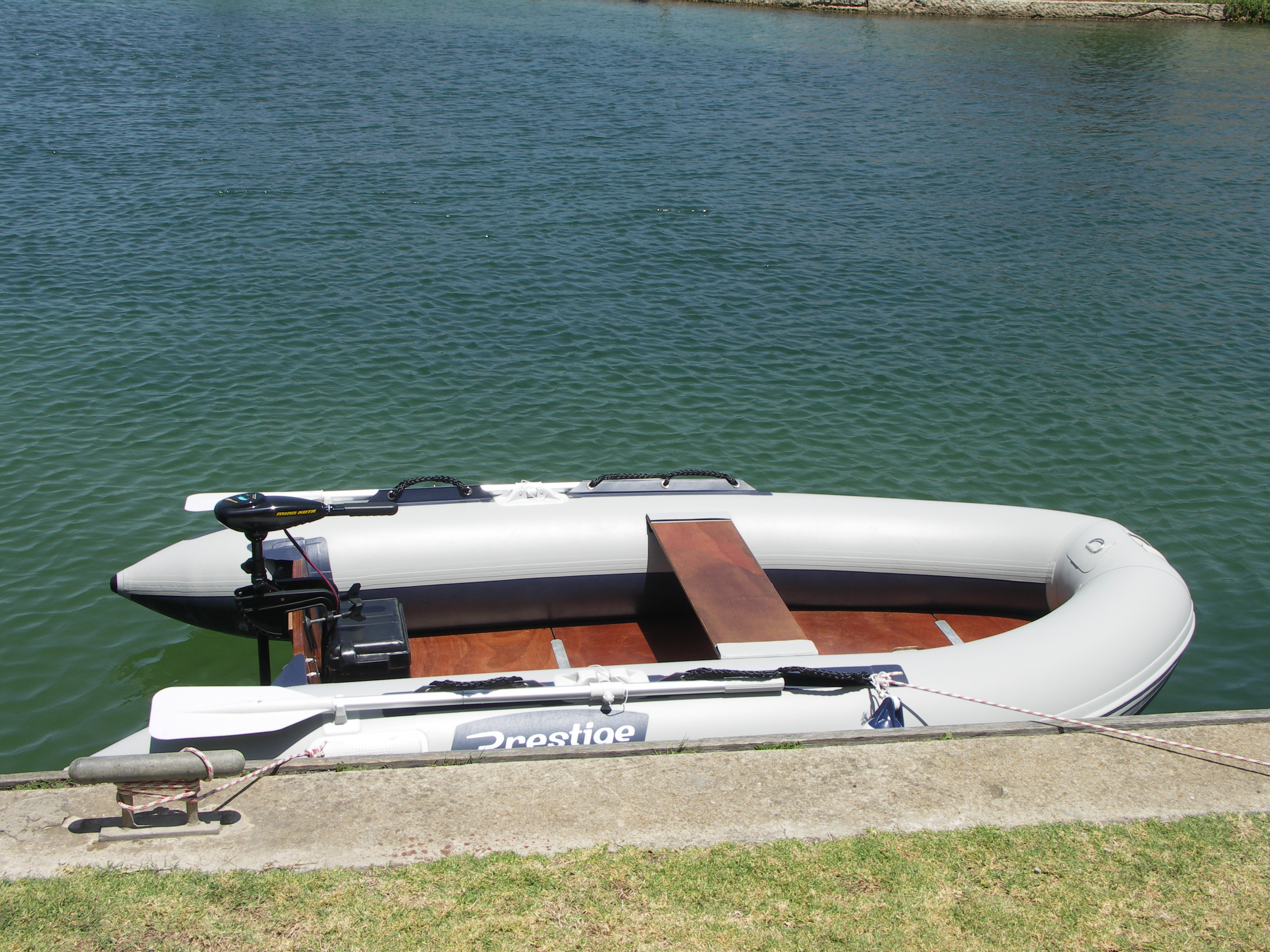
An inflatable boat.

An inflatable boat is a lightweight boat constructed with its sides and bow made of flexible tubes containing pressurised gas. For smaller boats, the floor and hull beneath it are often flexible. On boats longer than 3 metres or 10 feet, the floor often consists of three to five rigid plywood or aluminium sheets fixed between the tubes but not joined rigidly together. Often the transom is rigid, providing a location and structure for mounting an outboard motor.

Some inflatable boats have been designed to be disassembled and packed into a small volume, so they can easily be stored and transported to water when needed. Here the boat when inflated is kept rigid crossways by a foldable removable thwart. This feature allows such boats to be used as liferafts for larger boats or aircraft, and for travel or recreational purposes.

Other terms for inflatable boats are "inflatable dinghy", "rubber dinghy", "inflatable", or "inflatable rescue boat".

==== Pneumatic tire ====
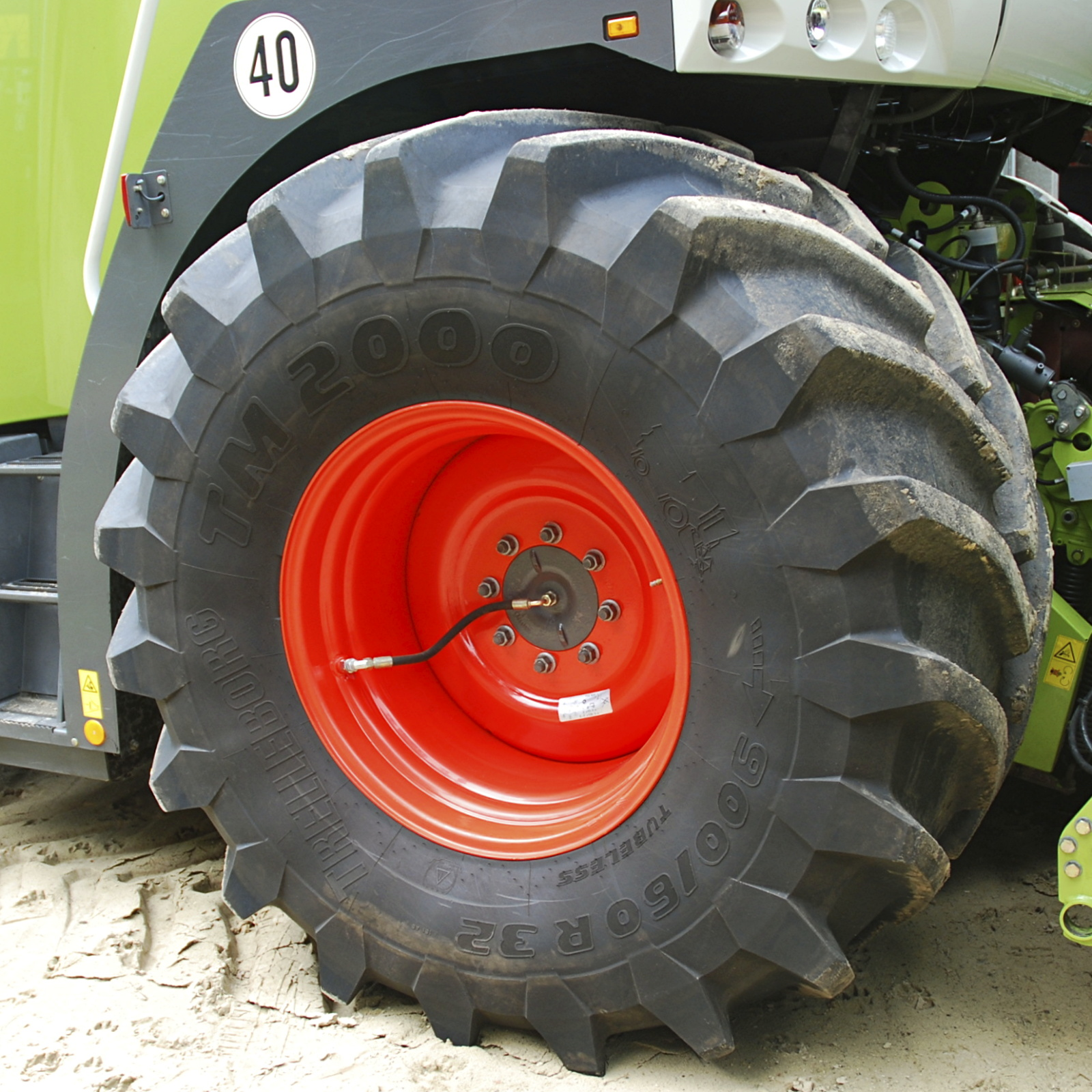
An inflated vehicle tire

A tire (in American English and Canadian English) or tyre (in British English, New Zealand English, Australian English and others) is a ring-shaped covering that fits around a wheel rim to protect it and enable better vehicle performance by providing a flexible cushion that absorbs shock while keeping the wheel in close contact with the ground. The word itself may be derived from the word "tie," which refers to the outer steel ring part of a wooden cart wheel that ties the wood segments together (see Etymology below).

The fundamental materials of modern tires are synthetic rubber, natural rubber, fabric and wire, along with other compound chemicals. They consist of a tread and a body. The tread provides traction while the body ensures support. Before rubber was invented, the first versions of tires were simply bands of metal that fitted around wooden wheels in order to prevent wear and tear. Today, the vast majority of tires are pneumatic inflatable structures, comprising a doughnut-shaped body of cords and wires encased in rubber and generally filled with compressed air to form an inflatable cushion. Pneumatic tires are used on many types of vehicles, such as bicycles, motorcycles, cars, trucks, earthmovers, and aircraft.

==== Air-supported structure ====
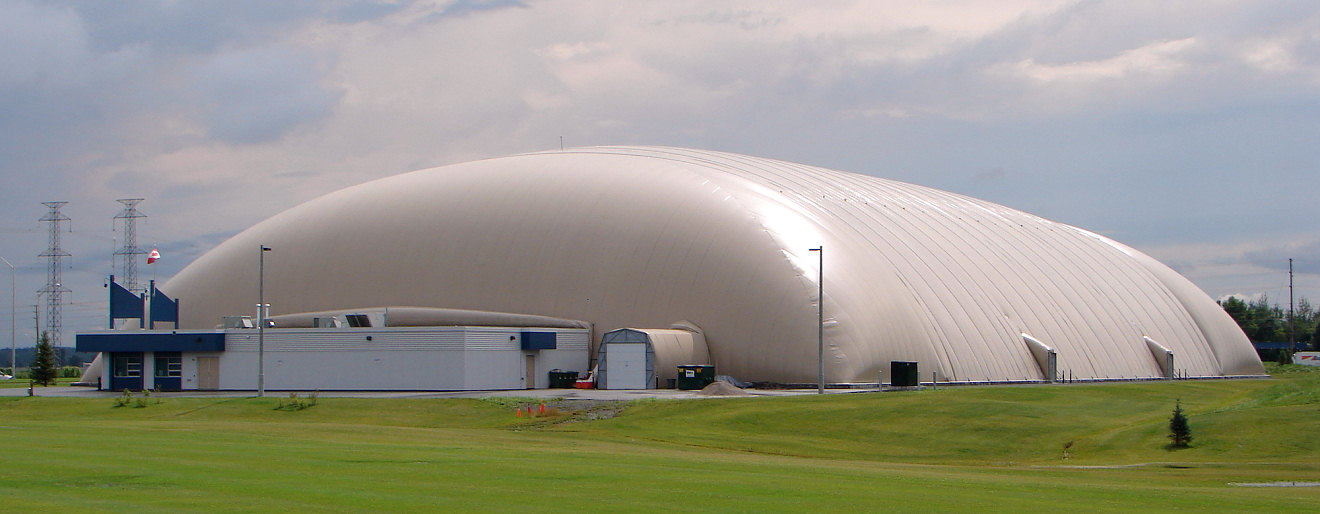
Air-supported dome used as a sports and recreation venue

An air-supported (or air-inflated) structure is any permanent building that derives its structural integrity from the use of internal pressurized air to inflate a pliable material (i.e. structural fabric) envelope, so that air is the main support of the structure. It is usually dome-shaped, since this shape creates the greatest volume for the least amount of material. However, rectangular inflatables are also possible, such as the Airtecture Exhibition Hall constructed by Festo AG & Co.

The concept was popularized on a large scale by David H. Geiger with the United States pavilion at Expo '70 in Osaka, Japan in 1970.

To maintain structural integrity, the structure must be pressurized such that the internal pressure equals or exceeds any external pressure being applied to the structure (i.e. wind pressure). The structure does not have to be airtight to retain structural integrity—as long as the pressurization system that supplies internal pressure replaces any air leakage, the structure will remain stable. All access to the structure interior must be equipped with two sets of doors or revolving door (airlock). Air-supported structures are secured by heavy weights on the ground, ground anchors, attached to a foundation, or a combination of these.

==== Inflatables for entertainment ====
The original inflatable game was the Moonwalk (bounce house). Today there are a wide variety of inflatable games that come in all shapes and sizes. Many inflatable games put people in head-to-head competition with other people such as the bungee run and gladiator joust. There are also several inflatable obstacle courses available. Because of their large size, most obstacle courses consist of two or more inflatables connected together.

There are also several variations on sports games which are made portable thanks to inflatables. A sports cage is an inflatable cage that holds up a backdrop that resembles a sport (e.g., baseball, American football, soccer, golf) in which you throw, toss, hit or kick a ball at a marked spot on the backdrop. The cage not only holds the backdrop but keeps balls from flying everywhere. Some sports cages come with a radar gun that will tell you the speed of your throw or kick.

==== Decorative inflatables ====
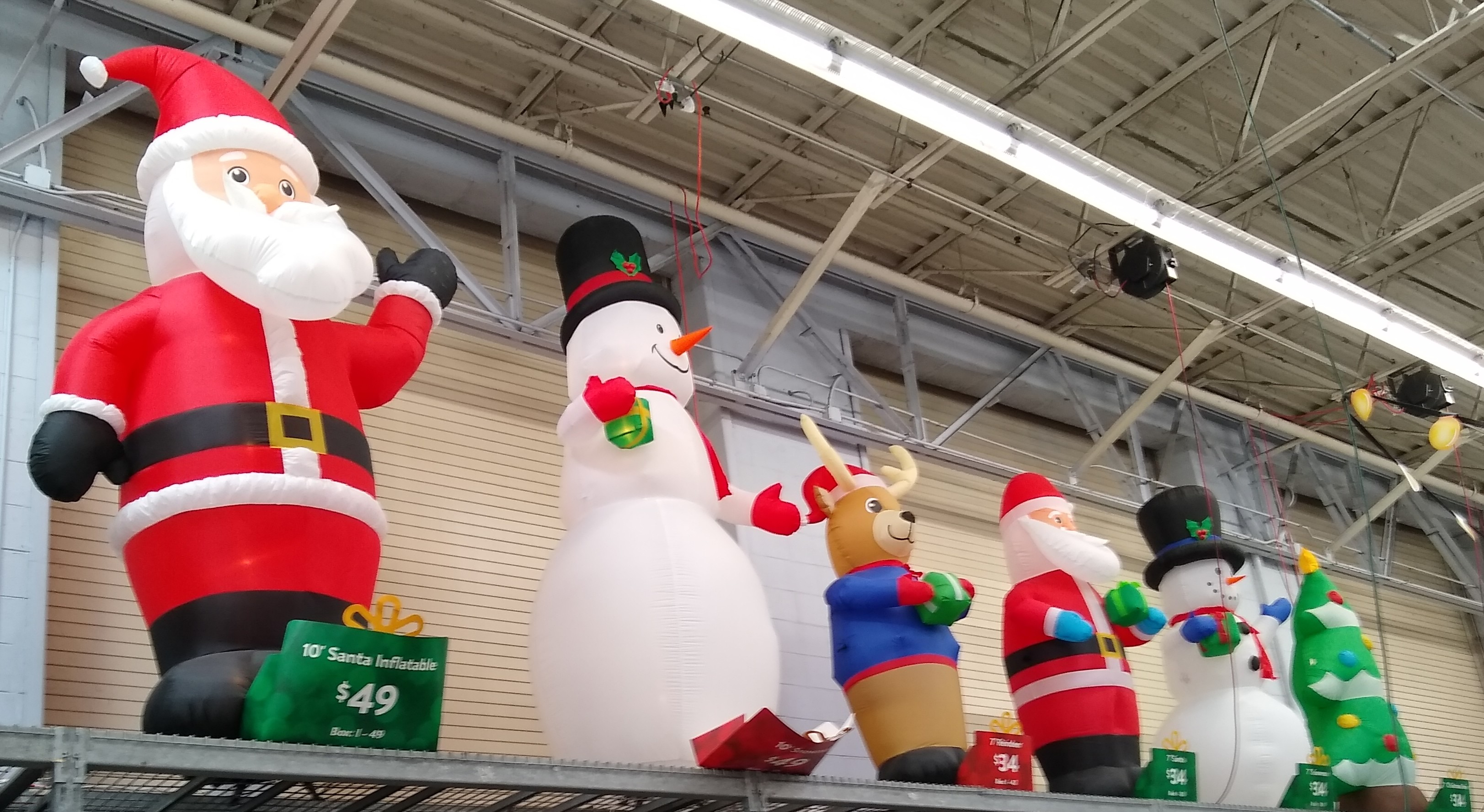
Holiday yard inflatables at a Walmart in The Villages, Florida.

During the 2000s, inflatables have replaced the plastic blow-molded yard decorations used as Christmas decorations at many U.S. homes, and are also now used as Halloween decorations and for other occasions as well.

These are made of a synthetic fabric, of which different colors have been sewn together in various patterns. An electric blower constantly forces air into the figure, replacing air lost through its fabric and seams. They are internally lit by small C7 incandescent light bulbs (also used in nightlights), which are covered by translucent plastic snap-on globes that protect the fabric from the heat if they should rest against it.

Inflatables come in various sizes, commonly four feet or 1.2 meters tall (operated with a low-voltage DC power supply and a computer fan), and six or eight feet (1.8 to 2.4 meters) tall, running directly from AC mains electricity. Like inflatable rides, outdoor types are staked to the ground with guy wires (usually synthetic rope or flat straps) to keep them upright in the wind, though being rather flimsy this does not always work. Heavy snow or rainwater which has accumulated may also prevent proper inflation.

While these store compactly, there are disadvantages, including the large amount of electricity needed to constantly keep them inflated. While they can be turned off in the daytime, this leaves the figure deflated, and subject to the rain and snow problem. Freezing rain, heavy snow, or high winds may also cause inflatables to collapse. Additionally, like a tent, they must be completely dry before being packed for storage, or mildew may be a problem (especially if kept in a basement).

Decorative inflatables can be mended using duct tape or rip stock patching tape. Since these materials are now available in colors, matching the patch to the inflatable is not difficult.

Decorative inflatables are made in many popular characters, including Santa Claus and snowmen for Christmas, and ghosts and jack-o-lanterns for Halloween. Several trademarked characters are also produced, including SpongeBob SquarePants, Winnie the Pooh, and Snoopy and Woodstock from Peanuts. There are also walk-through arches and "haunted houses" for children, and items for other holidays like Uncle Sam for Independence Day, and palm trees for backyard summer cookouts.

Since 2005, there are also inflatable snow globes which blow tiny styrofoam beads around on the inside, the blower's air jet picking them up and through a tube to the top, where they fall down inside the clear vinyl front. On others, mainly for Halloween, lightweight foam bats or ghosts spin around like confetti in what is called a "tornado globe". The figures inside both types are also inflatables.

Since 2006, several of these have motion, which is driven by the air itself and the Venturi effect. The original is a merry-go-round (usually surrounded by clear vinyl for support), another from 2007 is an airplane with moving propeller. Ghosts may also have streamers which blow around where the air escapes.

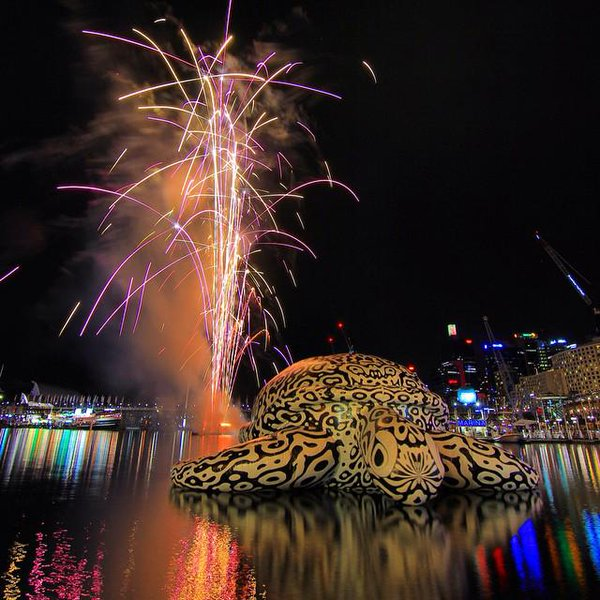
Alphie the Alpha Turtle floating on Darling Harbour (2014)

Inflatables have been made by visual artists and displayed in prominent places in Australia, including on the water in Sydney Harbour and in the sky over the city of Canberra. Examples include Alphie the Alpha Turtle and Patricia Piccinini's The Skywhale.

==== Structural inflatables ====
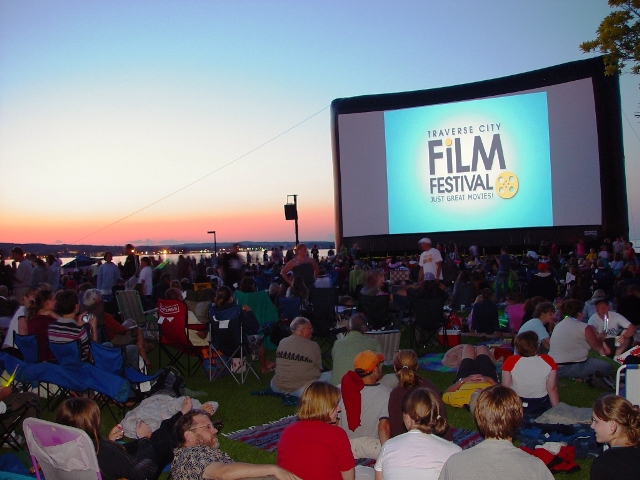
Public screening with an inflatable movie screen

Airbeams, inflatable spars, inflatable wings, and tensairity-enhanced inflatable bladders provide a means to structure practical objects.

Inflatable ballute structures have been proposed for use during aerocapture, aerobraking and atmospheric entry of cubesat and nanosat satellites. The inflatable structures for these applications may take a variety of engineered shapes including stacked toroidal, tension cone and isotensoid ballute form factors.

Inflatable space habitats have been proposed since the 1960s and one expandable space station is currently planned for launch in 2015.

=== Examples ===
Typical examples of an inflatable include the inflatable movie screen, inflatable boat, the balloon, the airship, evacuation slide, furniture, kites, and numerous air-filled swimming pool toys. Air beams as structural elements are finding increasing applications.

Smaller-scale inflatables (such as pool toys) generally consist of one or more "air chambers", which are hollow enclosures bound by a soft and flexible airtight material (such as vinyl), which a gas can enter into or leave from through valves (usually one on each air chamber). The design dependence upon an enclosed pocket of gas leads to a need for a very durable surface material and/or ease of repair of tears and holes on the material, since a puncture or tear will result in the escape of the gas inside (a leak) and the deflation of the inflatable, which depends on the gas's pressure to hold its form. Detectable leaks can be caused by holes (from punctures or tears) in the material, the separation of seams, the ware of part of the valve, or an improperly shut or improperly closed valve. Even if an inflatable possesses no macroscopic leaks, the gas inside will usually diffuse out of the inflatable, albeit at a much slower rate, until equilibrium is reached with the pressure outside the inflatable.

Inflatables are also used for the construction of specific sports pitches, military quick-assembly tents, camping tent air beams, and noise makers. Inflatable aircraft including the Goodyear Inflatoplane have been used. Inflation by dynamic ram-air is providing wings for hang gliding and paragliding.

Inflatables came very much into the public eye as architectural and domestic objects when synthetic materials became commonplace. Iconic structures like the US Pavilion at the 1970 Osaka Expo by Davis and Brody and Victor Lundy's travelling pavilion for the Atomic Energy Commission popularized the idea that inflatables can be a way to build large structures with very extended interior spans without pillars. These great hopes for inflatable structures would later be dashed by the many practical difficulties faced by inflatable buildings, such as climatization, safety, sensitivity to wind and fireproofing that, currently, restrict their use to very specific circumstances.

A patent was granted in Australia in 2001 for a "Manually portable and inflatable automobile" (Australian Patent Number 2001100029), however no known practical form of this type of inflatable has yet been commercialised.

Large scale low-pressure inflatables are often seen at festivals as decorations or inflatable games. These are made out of rip stop nylon and have a constant flow of air from a blower inflating them.

In some cases, an inflatable roof is added to an otherwise traditional structure: the biggest example in the world was the BC Place Stadium in Vancouver, British Columbia.

Inflatables have been used prominently in works of art by artists such as Paul Chan (artist), Martin Creed, John Jasperse, Jeff Koons, and Andy Warhol.

== See also ==
- Air mattress
- Airship
- Balloon
- Beach ball
- Body inflation
- Cold-air inflatables
- Inflatable arch
- Inflatable boat
- Inflatable tunnel
- Inflatable movie screen
- Inflatable costume
- Inflatable rat
- Leading edge inflatable kite
- List of inflatable manufactured goods
- Swim ring
- Stiffening
- Tire
- Tube man
