= Oral inflation valve =

Valve on inflatable toys

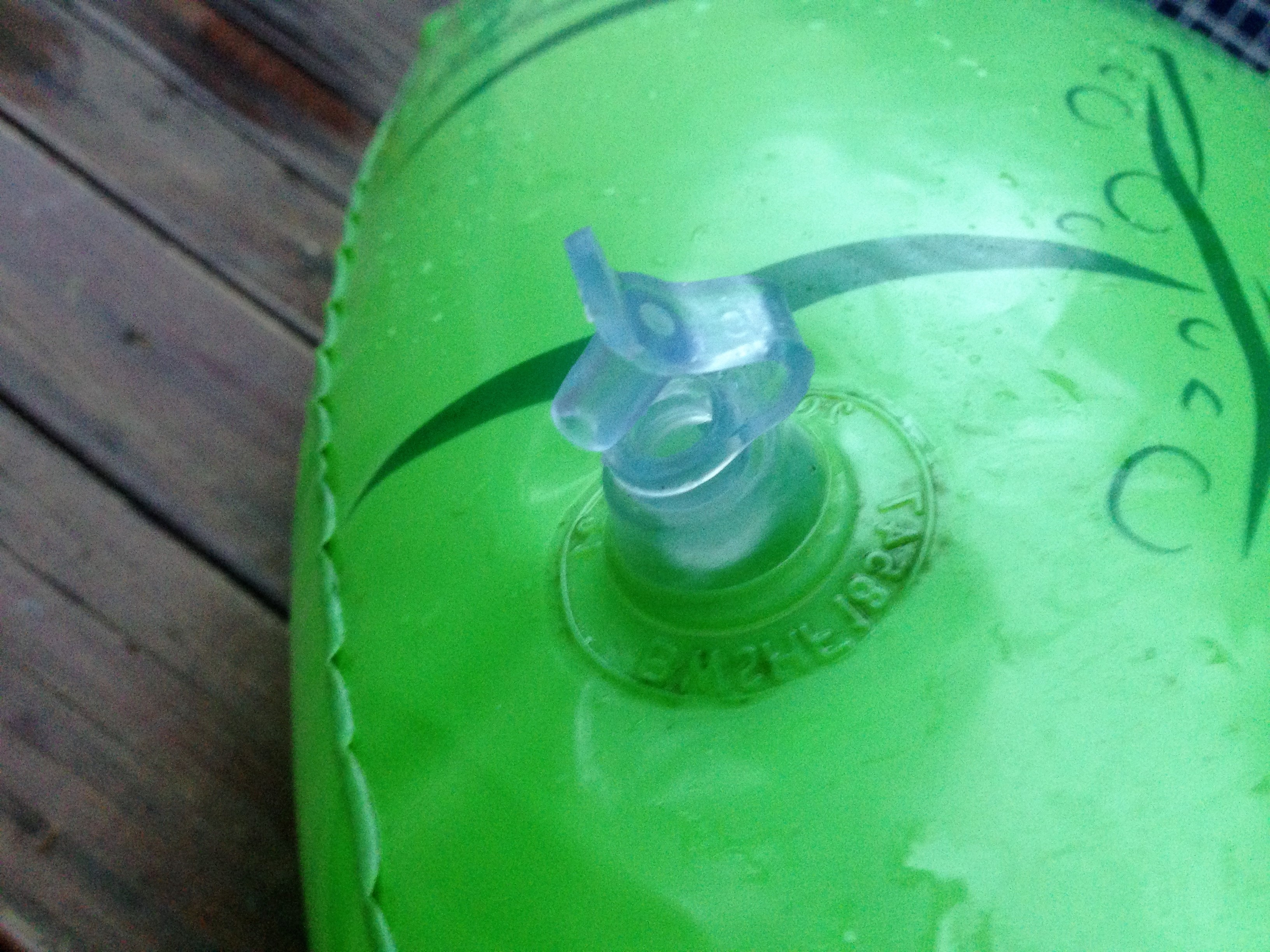
An oral inflation valve of a swimming toy.

An oral inflation valve is a valve present on most swim toys and beach balls. These inflation valves can also be filled with air pumps, which makes the process easier, faster and more hygienic. Since the valve is placed in the mouth and saliva can be ejected into the inflatable object, the valve is subjected to some health concerns; diseases like common cold, herpes, Hepatitis B, Hepatitis C and many others can be spread through the saliva in the air valve. Therefore, they should not be used orally if the inflatable object is not clean.

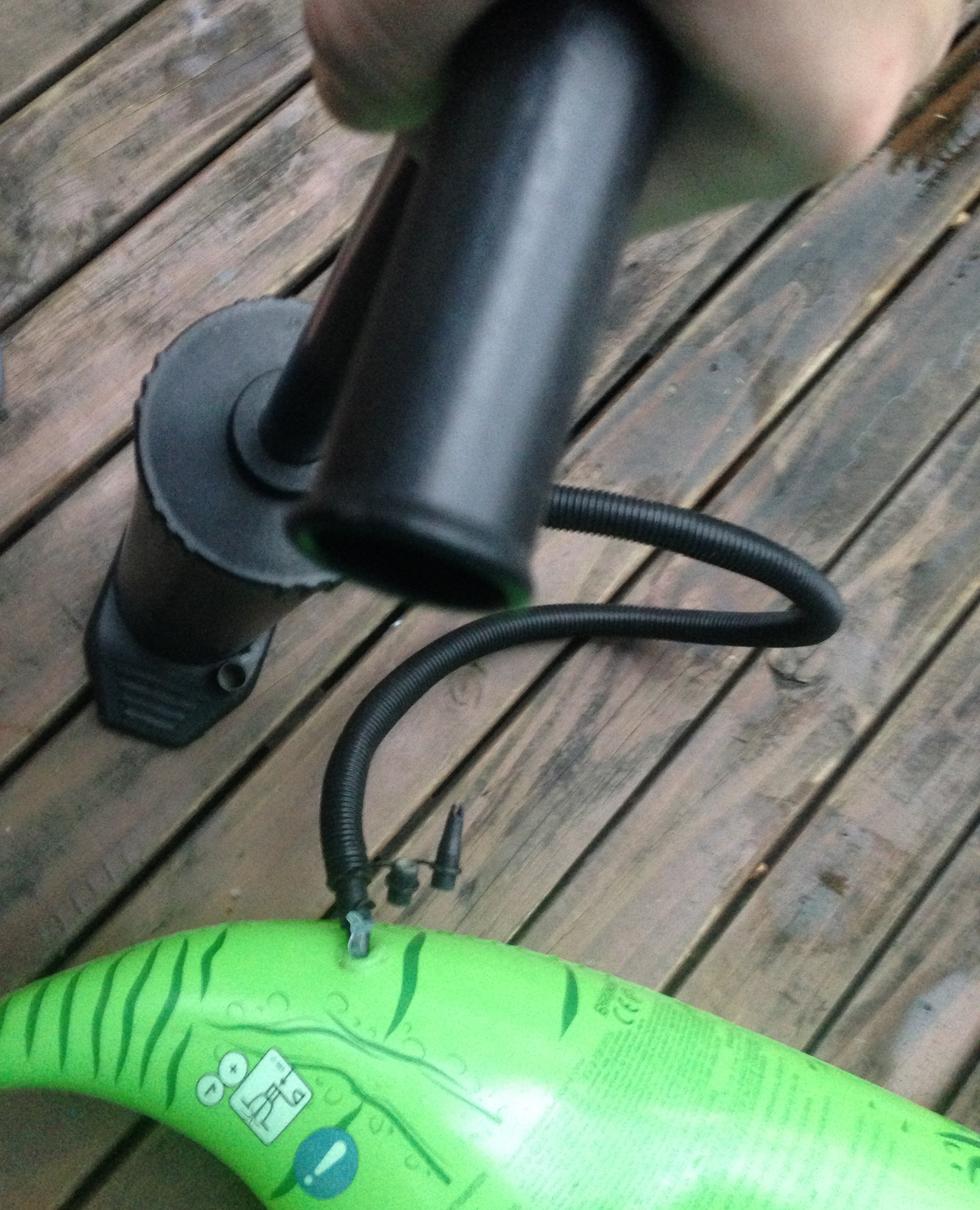
Air pump hose connected to the swimming toy's oral inflation valve.

The inflation valves have caps, which require to be open in order to fill the object with air by placing the lips and blow air inside it manually or use air pump's and closed after finish. To deflate an object and make transport or storage easier, the cap can be opened for the air to be drained, and the object can be squeezed so the deflation process is quicker. Some valves contain safety structures that require additional actions to let air through when the cap is removed.

== In other objects ==
Life preserver vests are often inflated with CO_{2}, but also have an oral inflation tube in case the gas doesn't work Some models of lifting bags for diving also have inflation valves.
