= Inflatable building =

The Spirit of Dubai inflatable building

An inflatable building is a structure constructed using two layers of membrane connected together, typically using spars made from the same material. The cavity formed between the layers is pressurized with air producing a rigid structural element which allows large span structures to be achieved.

The key difference between air-supported buildings and inflatable buildings is that air-supported buildings require airlocks at all the access points to prevent air being lost when doors are opened since the entire occupied space of the building is pressurized, whereas inflatable buildings do not require airlocks.

Inflatable buildings like this commonly serve sports, such as tennis and indoor golf.

== Structure ==
An inflatable building only requires pressurized air within the cavities of the walls and so does not require airlocks since the occupied interior of the building is at normal atmospheric pressure.

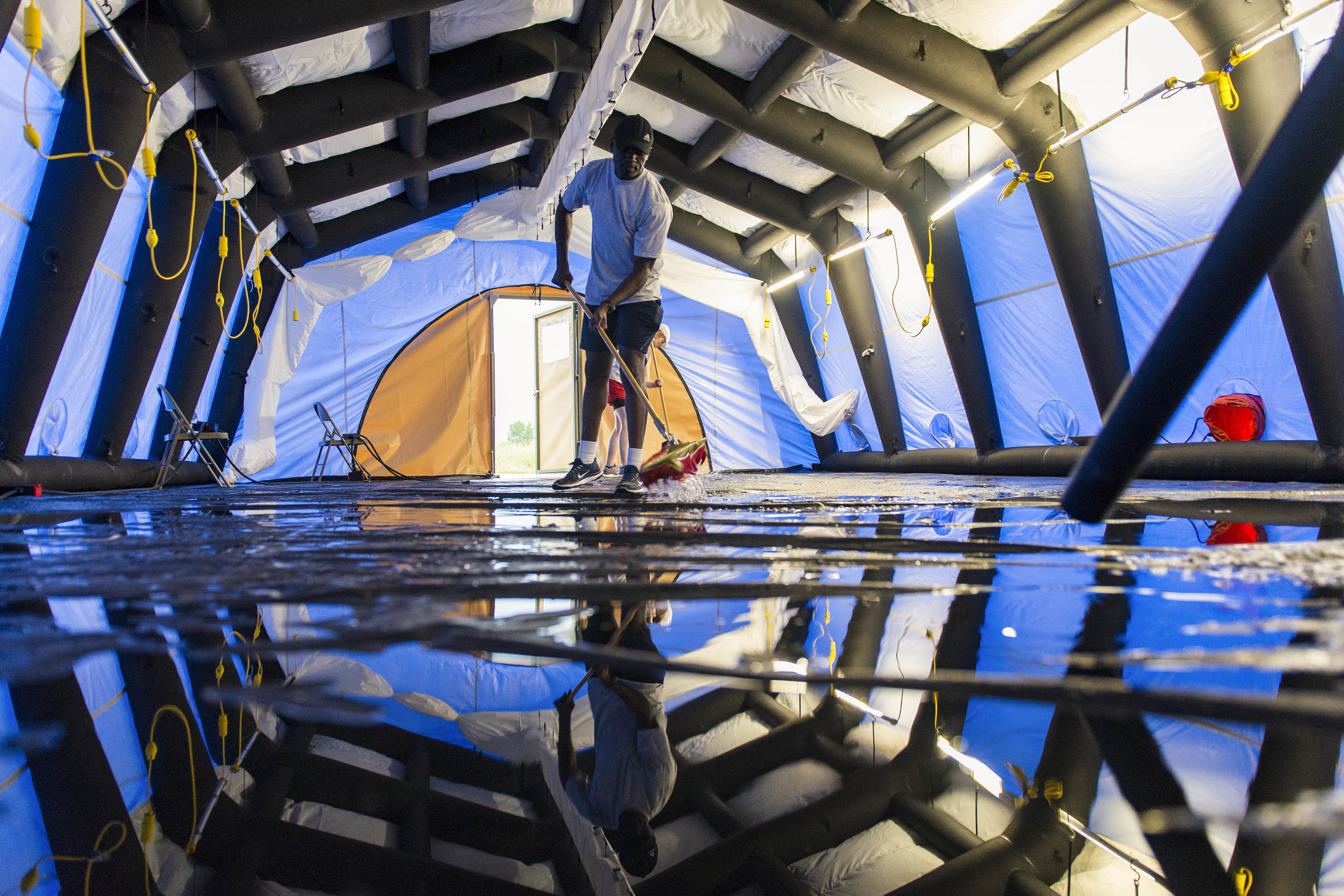
Interior of an inflatable structure with the pressurized supports visible along the walls and ceiling

The air contained within the walls of an inflatable building becomes a true structural part of the building. The membranes used in the construction of such buildings are typically less than 1mm thick, so the amount of membrane used compared to the volume of air contained within the walls is very low (typically less than 0.5%). This makes inflatable buildings efficient in terms of the amount of raw materials required to construct them.

The small amount of material used in the construction of inflatable buildings makes them highly portable. When a building needs to be moved, the air can simply be allowed to escape, enabling an entire building to be packed into a small volume compared to its inflated size. The building can then be transported easily to its new location and re-inflated.

== Uses ==
Inflatable structures and inflatable buildings can be used in many ways, including: membrane roofs and covers, sails, pavilions, airships, furniture, airspace structures, boats, escape slides, security mattresses, swimming pools, coverings, bouncy castles, airbags and many other applications. Inflatable churches and pubs have also been made.

== See also ==
- List of inflatable manufactured goods
