= Edmonton Soccer Dome =

Air-supported structure in Edmonton, Canada

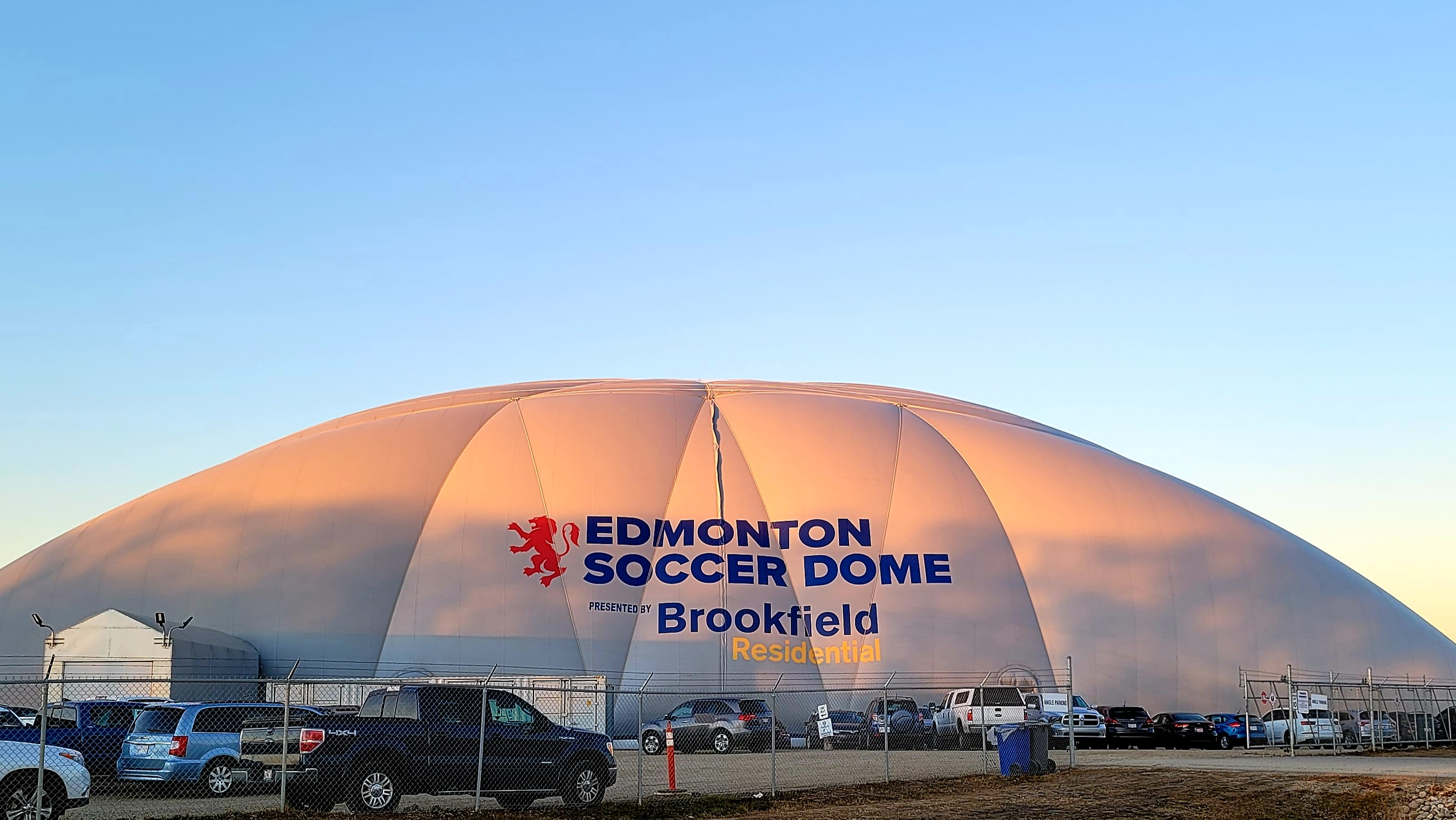
- Edmonton Soccer Dome in November 2021
- Interactive map of Edmonton Soccer Dome
- Full name: Edmonton Soccer Dome presented by Brookfield Residential
- Address: 3126 Ewing Trail SW
- Location: Grant MacEwan Park; Ellerslie, Edmonton, Alberta
- Coordinates: 53°24′17″N 113°29′14″W
- Owner: Edmonton Scottish Society
- Capacity: 1,000 (Total)
- Surface: FieldTurf CORE
- Field size: 12,541 m^{2} (134,990 sq ft)

Construction
- Groundbreaking: October 19, 2017
- Opened: October 12, 2018
- Cost: CA$7 million ($8.62 million in 2025 dollars)
- Project manager: Arizon Building Systems
- General contractor: Seko Construction
- Main contractors: Provincial Electrical Services; Thompson Construction Group

Tenant
- Edmonton Scottish (AMSL) (2018–present) Selects Football Club/EMSA South (Edmonton Minor Soccer Association) (2025-present)

Website
- www.edmontonsoccerdome.com

The Edmonton Soccer Dome is an air-supported structure located in Edmonton, Canada.

Predominately used for soccer, the facility stands 25.6 m (84 ft) tall and features a FieldTurf CORE artificial turf playing surface that covers 12,541 m^{2} (134,990 sq ft), making it the largest sports dome in Canada. Construction on the dome began in October 2017 at a cost of CA$7 million, officially opening in October 2018.

Along with its primary tenant Edmonton Scottish SC, the dome also served as the pre-season training facility for the former Canadian Premier League club FC Edmonton and as a temporary home for the ACAC's NAIT Ooks during the replacement of NAIT station. In addition to the facility and its grounds being named in the United 2026 FIFA World Cup bid as a potential team base camp in 2018, the dome has most notably hosted La Liga squad Real Valladolid, the Canadian men's national team, and Prime Minister Justin Trudeau.

== Facilities ==
Made of an inflatable, tensile fabric skin structure, the dome is fully air-climatized for year-round use. Inside, the playing surface can be configured to support several different soccer game models, with markings for four 7v7 pitches, three 9v9 pitches, or one 11v11 pitch. In addition to pitch markings, a two-lane, 450 m (1,480 ft) running track surrounds the playing surface. Adjacent to the dome sits a pavilion, with four dressing rooms, offices, and a lounge with full bar and concessions.

In 2021, the Edmonton Scottish Society announced plans to build a new clubhouse with additional amenities to support the dome, including twelve changing rooms, a bar, a restaurant, and a banquet hall.
