= Beach ball =

Inflatable ball for beach and water games

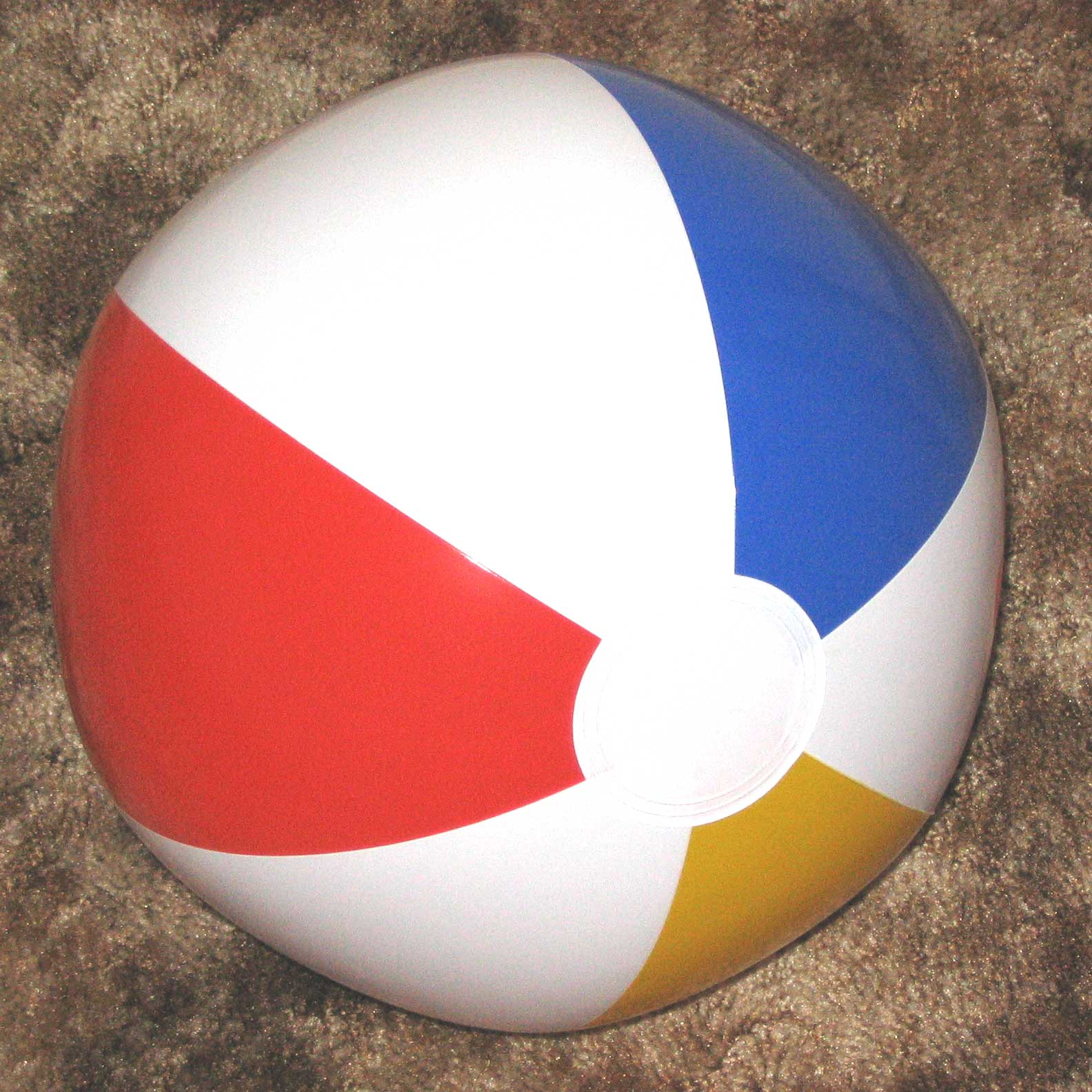
A beach ball

A beach ball is an inflatable ball for beach and water games. Their large size and light weight require little effort to propel them.

Beach balls became popular in the beach-themed films of the 1960s starring Annette Funicello and Frankie Avalon. These movies include Beach Party, Muscle Beach Party, Beach Blanket Bingo and How to Stuff a Wild Bikini.

== Design ==
Beach balls range from hand-sized to over 3 feet (0.91 m) across or larger. They generally have a set of soft plastic panels, with two circular end panels, one with an oral inflation valve, intended to be inflated by lung power or pump. A common design is vertical solid-colored stripes alternating with white stripes. There are also other designs, including beach balls in a single solid colour, promotional beach balls with advertisements or company slogans, globes or Emojis.

Some manufacturers specify the size of their beach balls (which is often confused with the diameter) as the tip-to-tip length of a deflated ball (approximately half the circumference), or even the length of the panels before they have their ends cut and joined into a beach ball. Thus, the actual diameter may be about $\frac{2}{\pi}$ (≈ 0.6366...) of the nominal size.

Other sizes of beach balls exist, ranging from smaller to larger ones. There are beach balls that have a diameter of 5 feet (1.5 m) or even 9 feet (2.7 m).

The world's largest beach ball was made in London, England on May 30, 2017. It was carried by a barge on River Thames. It had a diameter of 65.6 feet (20.0 m) with the word "Baywatch" written all over it. It was produced by Paramount Pictures to promote the 2017 movie Baywatch. The record was registered by Guinness and the certificates were given to the members of the film's cast.

== Uses ==
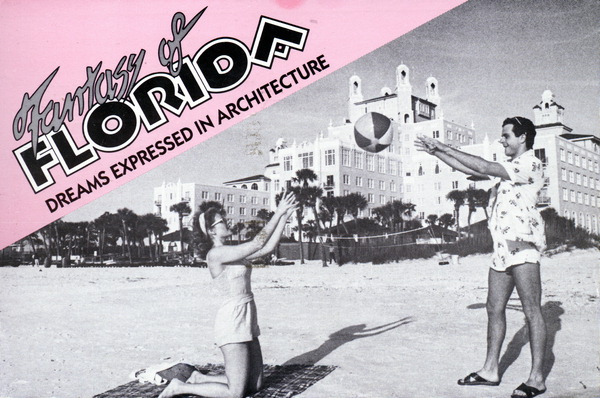
A couple playing with a beach ball in a 1985 Florida postcard

Beach ball sports include water polo and volleyball. While they are much less expensive than the balls used in professional sports, they are also much less durable, as most of them are made of soft plastic. Giant beach balls may be tossed between crowd members at concerts, festivals, and sporting events. Many graduates use beach balls as a prank during ceremonies, hitting them around the crowd. They are bounced around crowds at cricket, baseball and football games, but are frequently confiscated and popped by security. Some security personnel at these events might inspect the ball's interior after tearing it, most likely searching for illegal items (e.g. narcotics) that might be transported inside the beach ball. Guards may also do this so that the ball cannot enter the field and obstruct or distract players. This happened in August 1999, in a baseball game between the Cleveland Guardians and the Los Angeles Angels, where the distraction caused by a beach ball on the field resulted in the Angels' defeat.

Their light weight and stability make beach balls ideal for trained seals to balance on their noses, which has become an iconic scene. Beach balls are also a popular prop used in swimsuit photography and to promote or represent beach-themed events or locations. Popular games using the beach ball include, volleyball, beach ball, and ball.

Some more basic uses of beach balls include a game's tool, a toy, or just a decoration in certain events. Another basic use of them is simply for sitting, sizes ranging from 24" to 42" are commonly used. Some examples regarding to the use of sitting are for seats in certain parties (i.e. birthday parties, pool parties, house parties, etc.). However, they are not as reinforced as exercise balls. Excessive sitting and bouncing can slowly damage the beach ball, which may cause it to eventually leak or even burst.

== See also ==
- Balloon
- Inflatable
- List of inflatable manufactured goods
