= Inflatable rat =

Oversized inflatable figure of a rat, often used for labor protests

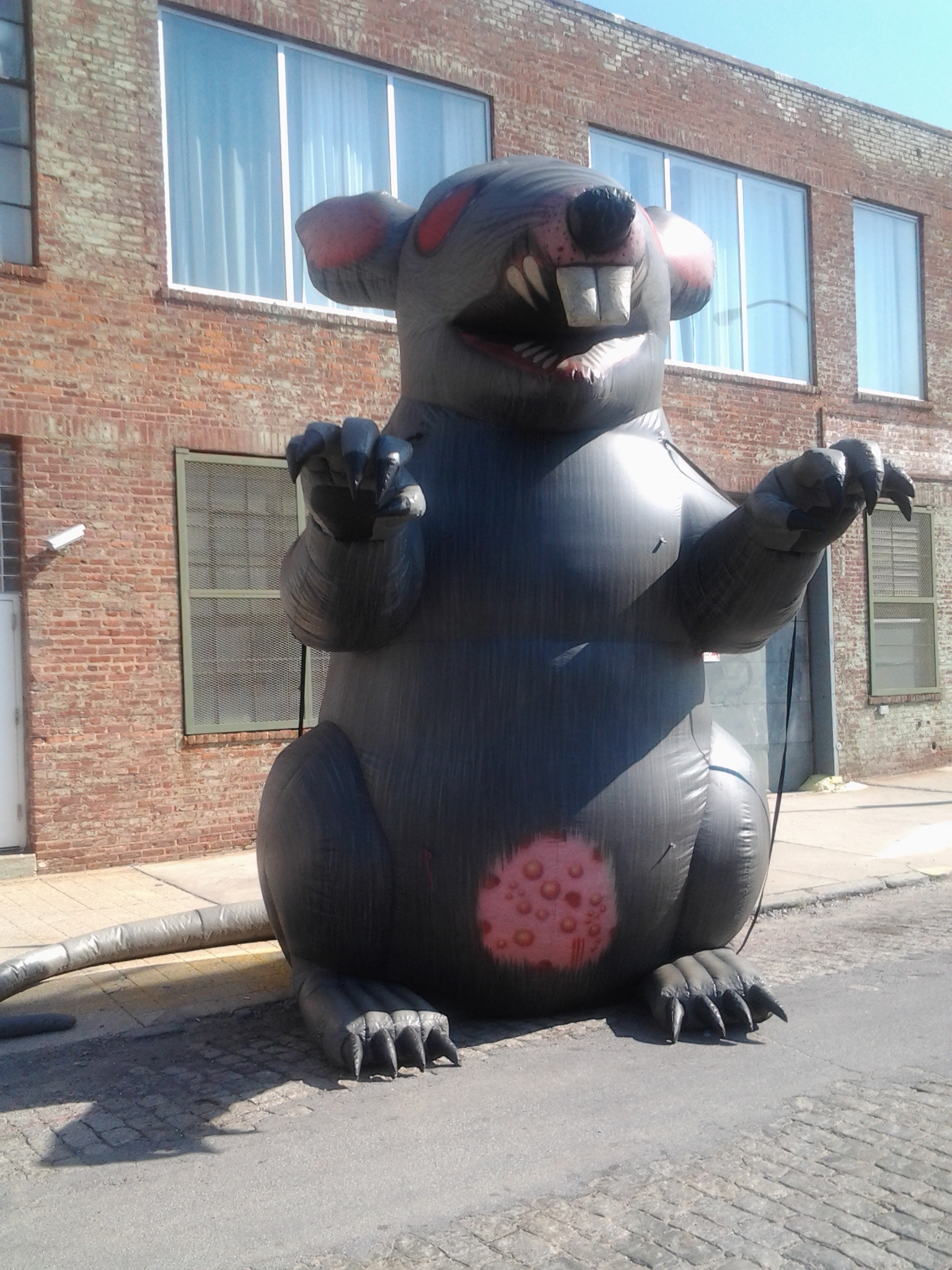
Inflatable rat in Long Island City

Scabby the Rat, otherwise known as inflatable rats or union rats, is a series of giant inflatables in the shape of cartoon rats, commonly used in the United States by protesting or striking trade unions. They serve as a sign of opposition against employers or nonunion contractors and are intended to call public attention to companies employing nonunion labor or engaging in union-busting activities.

== History ==
The first known inflatable rat was used by the International Union of Operating Engineers Local 150 in Plainfield, Illinois in 1989, according to photos from the Local 150 Engineer in November 1989, which also launched a "Name the Rat" contest. In January 1990, it announced that "Scabby" was the winning submission, in reference to the slang "scab" for strikebreakers and non-striking workers, coming from Local 150 member Lou Mahieu. An alternative origin story credits the International Union of Bricklayers and Allied Craftworkers who credit Ken Lambert with the design in 1990 or 1991, a member of the Chicago District Council, and claim to still have the original model in their Chicago office storage.

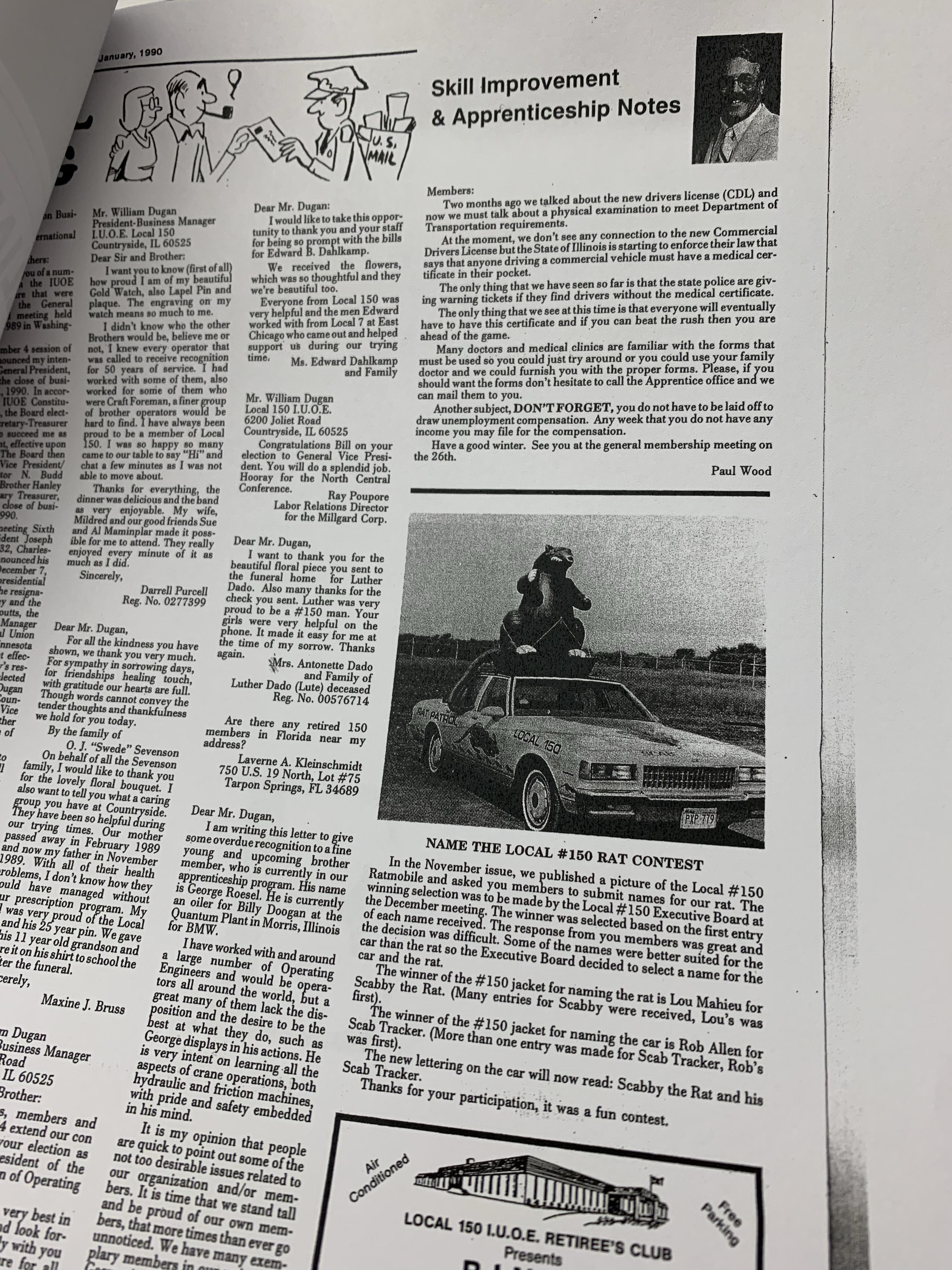
Announcement of Scabby the Rat naming contest in the Local 150 newsletter, January 1990

The inflatable rats all originated from one American manufacturer, a company called Big Sky, who produced hot air balloons and standalone inflatables. It was commissioned by Lambert and designed by one of the co-owners, who Lambert asked to make the design to be "'meaner looking,' with big claws and 'festering nipples,'" with "menacing" fingers and whiskers and "more scabrous" belly. Other unions also began using inflatable rats in the 1990s to shame companies that employ nonunion labor. In part as a result of increasing business from unions, Big Sky’s sales doubled between 1990 and 1991, and developed other "union inflatables," such as a cockroach, a "Corporate Fat Cat", a "Greedy Pig". It was estimated that Big Sky at one point sold a half-dozen Scabbies per month at a price of up to $10,000 each. Now many American unions own dozens of the inflatable rat for use in labor disputes. Notably, Big Sky was not a union shop, and likely outsourced their manufacturing of Scabbies as early as 1997, and later claimed to stop selling union inflatables when its owner became a supporter of Donald Trump.

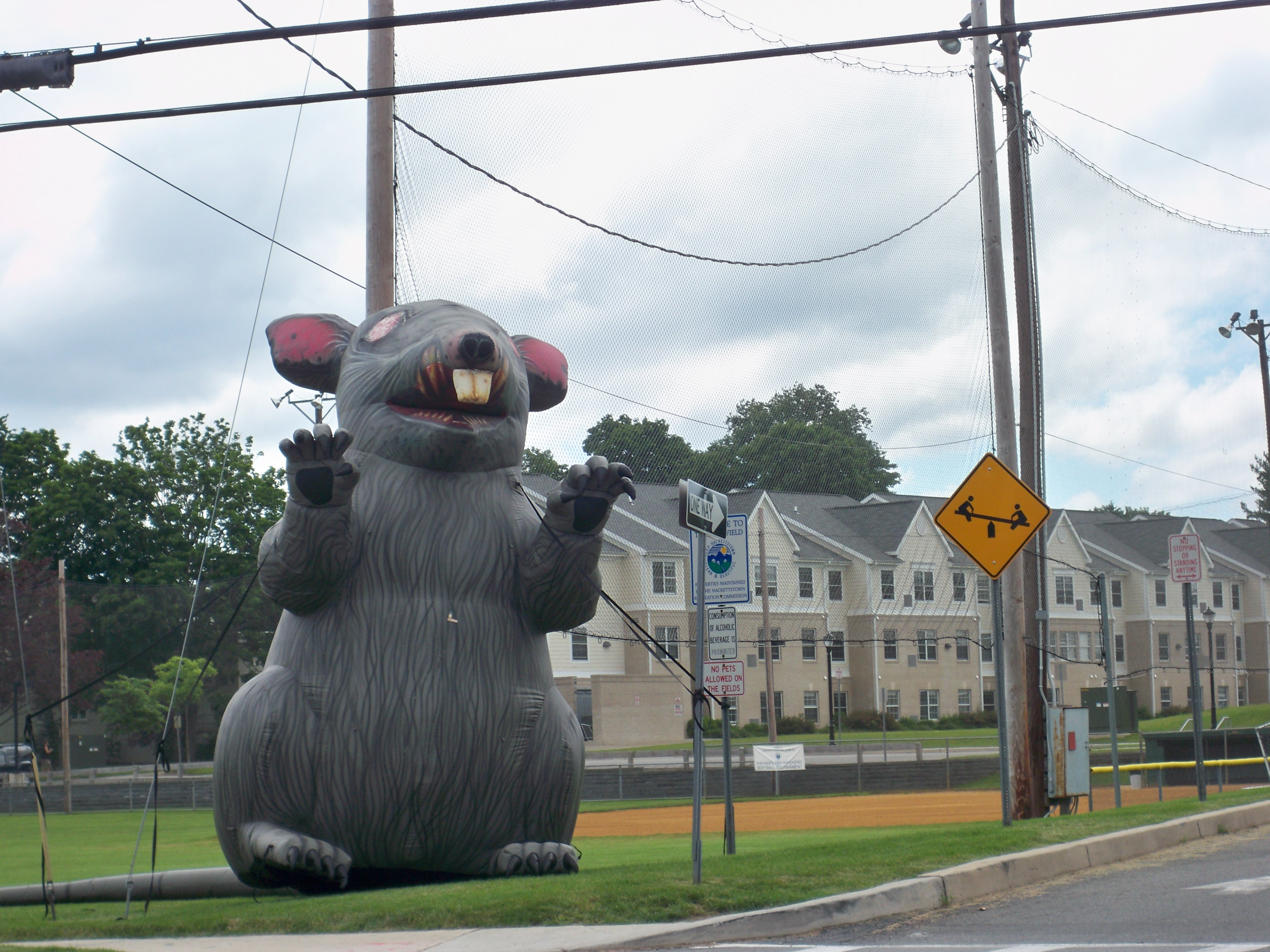
Inflatable rat in Hackettstown, New Jersey

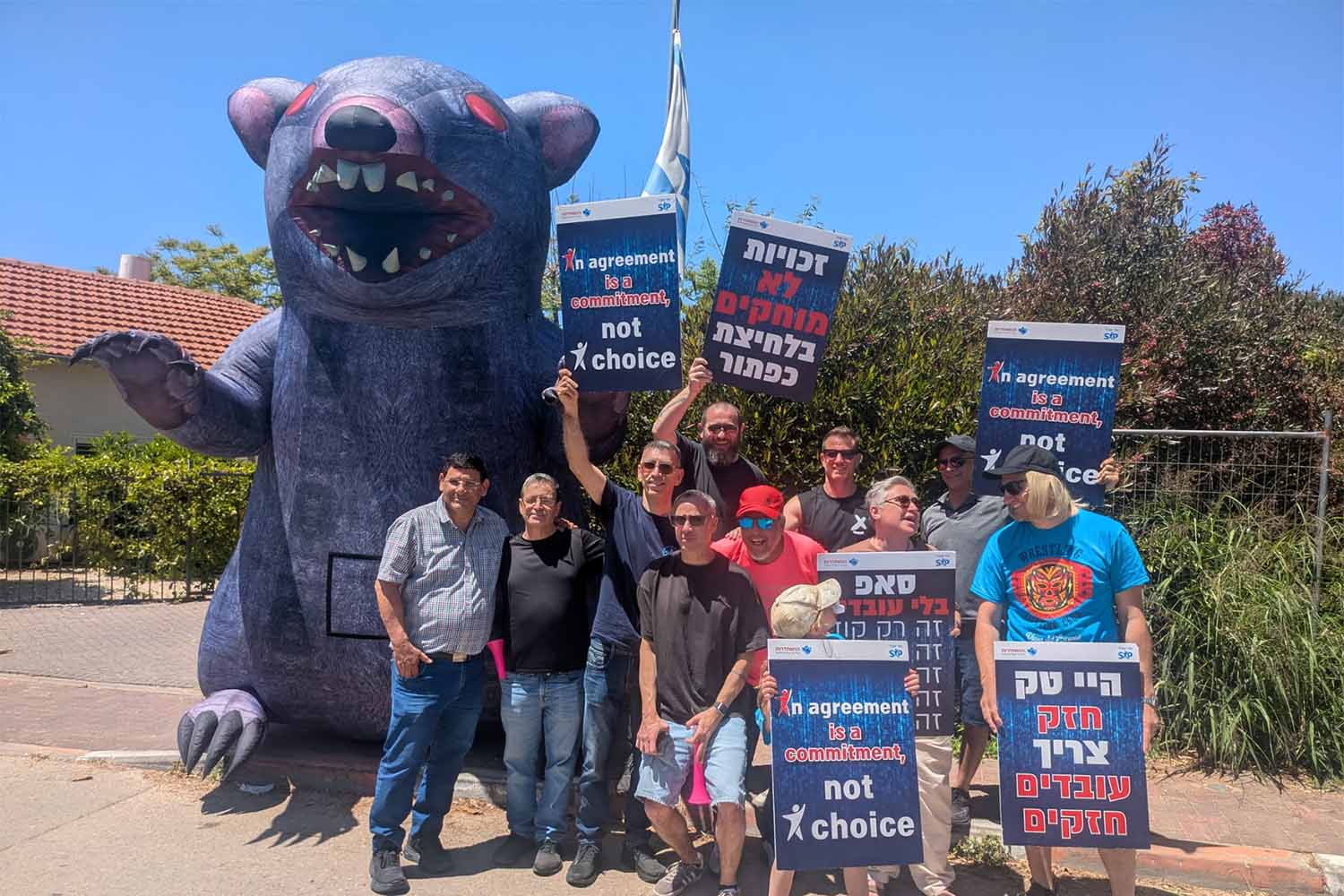
Inflatable union rat in Histadrut protest in Israel

Employers have filed lawsuits charging that the use of the giant inflatable rats constituted unlawful picketing, and some courts have agreed. In May 2011, the National Labor Relations Board (NLRB) held that union use of an inflatable monster rat is not considered an unlawful activity when directed at a secondary employer. In 2011 National Labor Relations Board (NLRB) in Sheet Metal Workers Local 15, 356 NLRB No. 162 (2011) ruled that the inflatable rat did not constitute a signal picket but instead constituted symbolic speech, which is not subject to secondary boycott rules. This holding allows the union not only to place the inflatable rats at neutral entrances but also to place them at locations where the picketed company is absent. In 2017, NLRB general counsel Peter B. Robb filed court motions seeking to change the previous policy, arguing that the presence of the inflatable rat was "confrontational, threatening, and coercive." Robb's complaint was set aside by a 3–1 vote of the NLRB on July 21, 2021.

The inflatable rat appeared in the UK for the first time in 2012 and again at the 2013 Grangemouth Oil Refinery dispute.

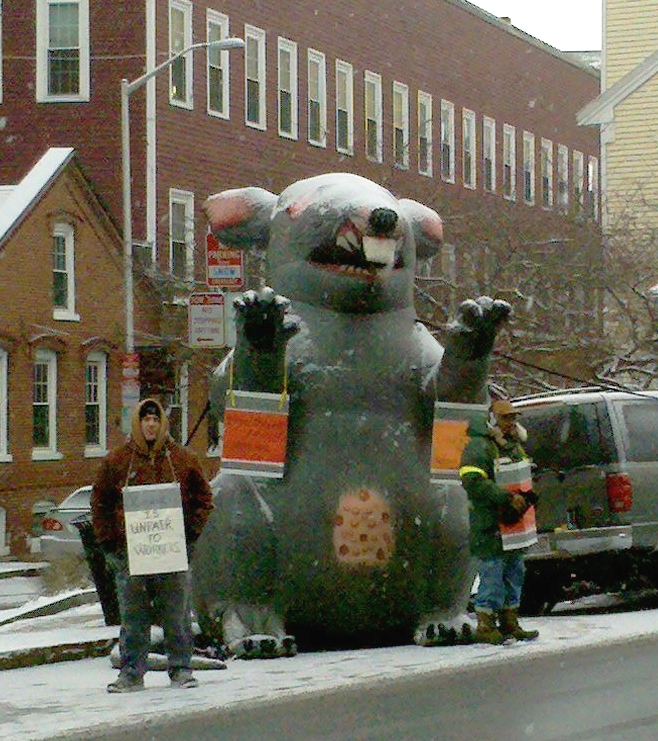
Inflatable rat in Cambridge, Massachusetts

It is used by unions also in Australia, Canada and Israel.

== Appearance ==
While the inflatable rat sometimes varies in appearance and size, it generally features large teeth and grotesque features, particularly a scabby belly.

As of 2003, the rats ranged from 6 to 30 feet (1.8 to 9.1 m) tall, but 12 feet (3.7 m) is the most popular height due to local laws limiting the height of inflatable objects on display.

== Popular culture ==
Scabby had a cameo appearance in an episode of The Sopranos in 2002, acquired through the unionized crew's theatrical Teamsters Union.

In November 2024, an art exhibition called Scabby: A Rat About Town by artist Marlene Hausegger at Open Source Gallery in Brooklyn featured the inflatable rat and highlighted recent labor struggles.

== Similar actions ==
Since August 2017, Trumpy the Rat, an inflatable caricature of Donald Trump as a rat has been used to protest.

In October 2018, Nelson Saiers installed a 9-foot inflatable rat covered with bitcoin references and code in front of the Federal Reserve Bank of New York as an homage to bitcoin. In September 2024, a smaller version of the rat was placed at Sans Souci Cottage on Jekyll Island, the location of a 1910 meeting that led to the creation of the Federal Reserve System.

In 2024, Teamsters in Rhode Island, Massachusetts and Philadelphia brought a giant inflatable pig with a bag of money, cigar and CEO badge to their pickets outside the Amazon Fulfillment Center.

In 2025, New York State Public Employees Federation debuted a giant inflatable Bull (dubbed the Inflate-a-Bull) as part of a campaign to combat workplace bullying.

== See also ==
- List of inflatable manufactured goods
- History of union busting in the United States
- Anarchist symbolism
- Labor unions in the United States
- Anarcho-syndicalism
- Industrial Workers of the World
- Diversity of tactics
- Molly Crabapple
