= Skyball =

Bouncy ball toy

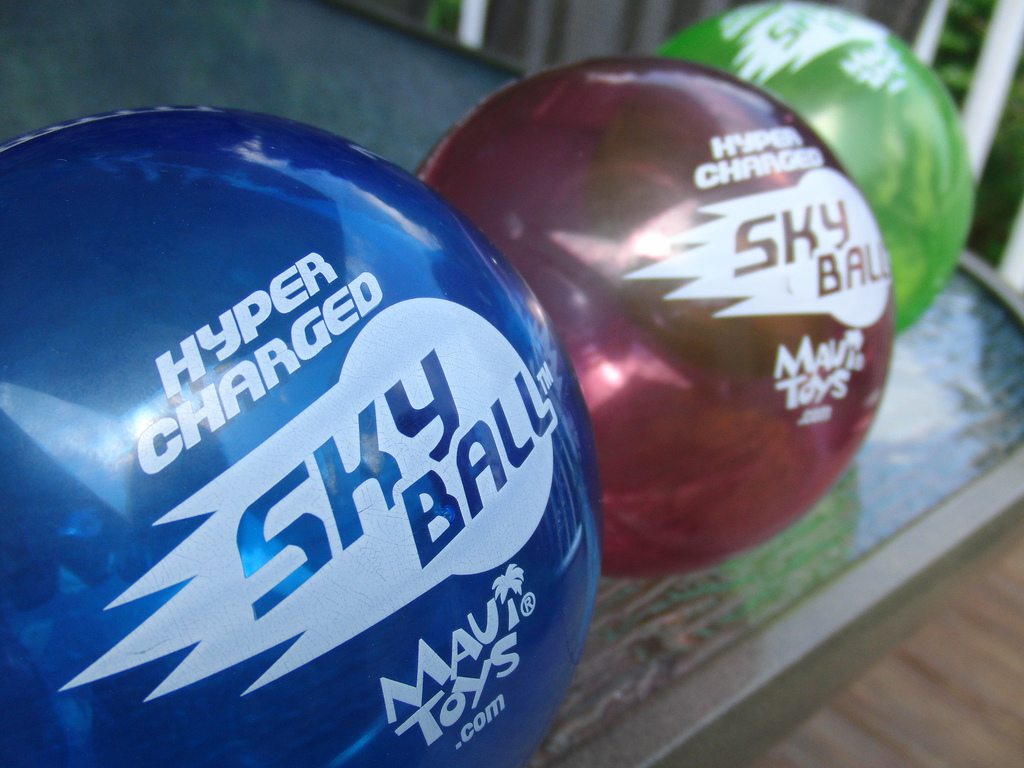
Three colors of Skyballs.

Slow motion video of Skyball bounce.

Audio of two Skyballs bouncing around.

The Sky Ball is a mid-sized bouncy ball toy sold by Maui Toys. Each ball measures 4 inches (10 cm) in diameter and contains a mix of helium and compressed air.

It has received critical acclaim for its high restitution, or bounciness. The Skyball is often compared to the popular 1965 Wham-O Superball, with the Skyball being advertised as bouncing 75 feet (23 m), "higher than a 1.5 inch superball". In 2010, the ball was packaged with a plastic baseball bat, and advertised as flying as far as 300 feet (91 m) when struck.

== See also ==
- List of inflatable manufactured goods
