= Inflatable costume =

Costume inflated around the wearer

An inflatable costume or air-inflated costume is a costume that is inflated around the wearer by means of a battery-powered blower that sucks air into the costume. These costumes usually stand 9–10 feet (2.7–3.0 m) tall when inflated.

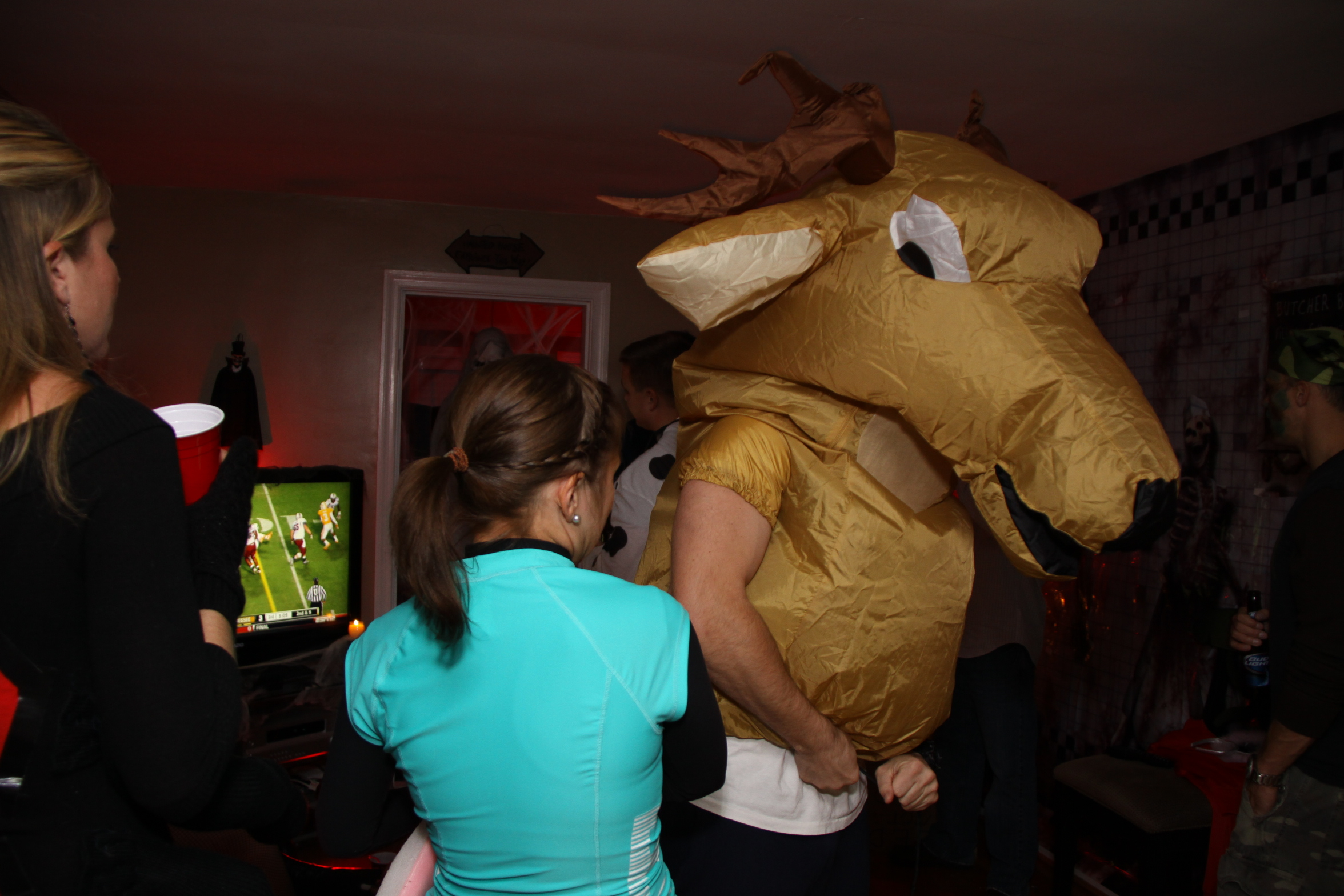
A man wearing an inflatable deer costume

Inflatable costumes are typically used by mascots and started appearing in the 1990s. One of the first inflatable mascots was Lil' Red of the University of Nebraska–Lincoln. Most NBA teams own an inflatable costume.

In the UK inflatable costumes are becoming more popular, and many people are wearing them for fun at parties etc. These are smaller versions of the costumes worn by mascots in the US. They are used by stepping into the costume, turning on the small electric fan and then pulling a drawstring at the neck, and the costumes quickly inflate.

Popular costumes include the inflatable sumo wrestler, ballerina, cowboy, cow costume, pig costume, T-Rex costume and chicken costume.

An inflatable Tyrannosaurus rex costume was a bestseller on Amazon in the U.S. in 2019.

== See also ==
- List of inflatable manufactured goods
