= Inflatable tunnel =

Object used in American football

Inflatable tunnel used by Sulphur Springs High School

In American football, an inflatable tunnel or air-inflated tunnel is a tunnel that is inflated by an external cold air inflation fan connected to the tunnel via an inflation tube. Inflatable tunnels are customarily 10 to 30 ft (3 to 9 m) long when inflated and often attached to inflatable helmets, mascots or team logos.

Inflatable tunnels are typically used by professional, college and high school sports teams and first started appearing in the 1980s. Most NFL teams now use an inflatable tunnel for player introductions. By 1996, inflatable tunnels began to be used by high school football programs, and their use is now common at the high school level in top football states like Texas.

== See also ==
- List of inflatable manufactured goods
