= ULYZ =

Defunct Belgian small inflatable boat builder

- Company type: Private company (s.p.r.l)
- Industry: Boat building
- Founded: 2006; 19 years ago
- Founder: Alexander Mandl
- Defunct: 2011
- Fate: Closed
- Headquarters: Brussels, Belgium
- Area served: Worldwide
- Products: inflatable boats and Rigid-hulled inflatable boats
- Website: www.ulyz.com

ULYZ was a Belgian shipyard and brand that designed, manufactured and marketed inflatable boats and rigid-hulled inflatable boat (RIBs). The company operated from 2006 until around 2011 when it was closed.

== History ==
Founded in 2006 by Alexander Mandl in Brussels, Belgium, ULYZ started out selling just one model of an inflatable boat that came in different sizes. Two years later and ULYZ had created three other models (Starter, Freedom, and Expert) and started selling RIBs to appeal to a wider customer base.

The name ULYZ is derived from Ulysses, a character in ancient Greek literature.

=== Products ===
In June 2007, ULYZ released their very own catalogue consisting of 8 inflatable boats - some notable inclusions were the ULYZ U-SD-500, ULYZ U-SD 600 and the ULYZ U-SD 245.

In June 2010, ULYZ released the new Freedom 300+ as a first step to renew its product line.

=== Club ULYZ ===
In August 2010, ULYZ established the Club ULYZ to serve as a community of ULYZ boat owners. It includes a website with forums and blogs and gave members the possibility to talk about their hobbies (fishing, nautical activities for example), and share their boat experiences. The club also made it possible that members could make suggestions to help develop new products.

== See also ==
- Inflatable boat
- Rigid-hulled inflatable boat
