= Air-supported structure =

Pressurized building-size envelope

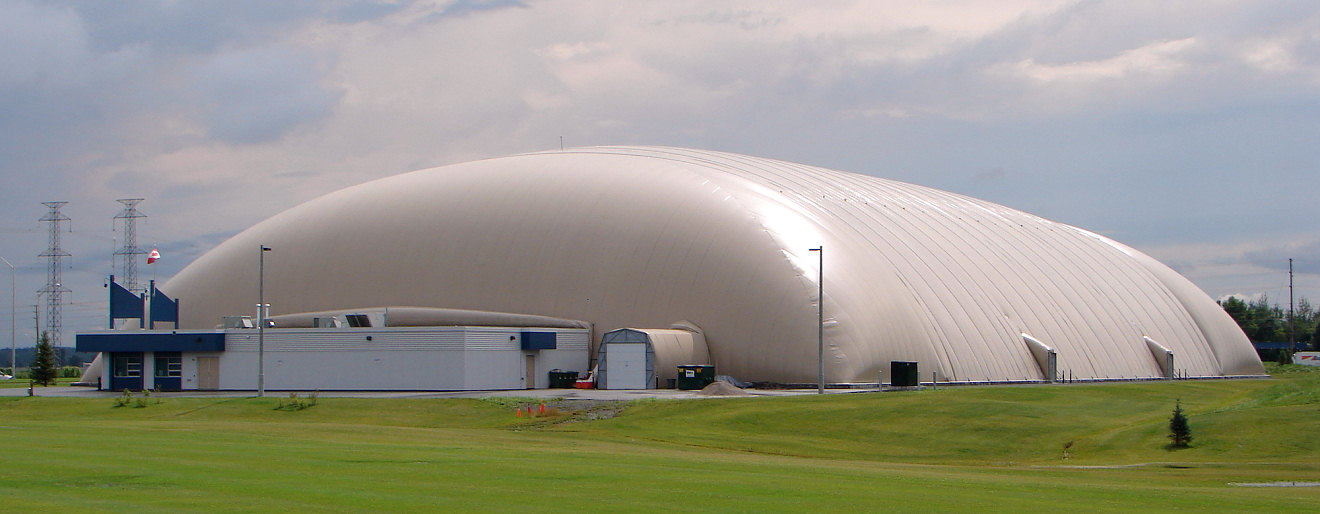
Air-supported dome used as a sports and recreation venue

An air-supported (or air-inflated) structure is any building that derives its structural integrity from the use of internal pressurized air to inflate a pliable material (i.e. structural fabric) envelope, so that air is the main support of the structure, and where access is via airlocks.

The first air-supported structure built in history was the radome manufactured at the Cornell Aeronautical Laboratory in 1948 by Walter Bird.

The concept was implemented on a large scale by David H. Geiger with the United States pavilion at Expo '70 in Osaka, Japan, in 1970.

It is usually dome-shaped, since this shape creates the greatest volume for the least material. To maintain structural integrity, the structure must be pressurized such that the internal pressure equals or exceeds any external pressure being applied to the structure (i.e. wind pressure). The structure does not have to be airtight to retain structural integrity—as long as the pressurization system that supplies internal pressure replaces any air leakage, the structure will remain stable. All access to the structure interior must be equipped with some form of airlock—typically either two sets of parallel doors or a revolving door or both. Air-supported structures are secured by heavy weights on the ground, ground anchors, attachment to a foundation, or a combination of these.

Among its many uses are: sports and recreation facilities, warehousing, temporary shelters, and radomes. The structure can be either wholly, partial, or roof-only air supported. A fully air-supported structure can be intended to be a temporary or semi-temporary facility or permanent, whereas a structure with only an air-supported roof can be built as a permanent building.

== Design ==
=== Shape ===
The shape of an air-supported structure is limited by the need to have the whole envelope surface evenly pressurized. If this is not the case, the structure will be unevenly supported, creating wrinkles and stress points in the pliable envelope which in turn may cause it to fail.

In practice, any inflated surface involves a double curvature. Therefore, the most common shapes for air-supported structures are hemispheres, ovals, and half cylinders.

=== Structure ===
The main loads acting against the air-supported envelope are internal air pressure, wind, or weight from snow build-up. The structure is actively supported at all times by blowing in more air, which requires energy.

To compensate against wind force and snow load, the structure's inflation is adjusted accordingly. Modern structures have computer controlled mechanical systems that monitor dynamic loads and automatically compensate the inflation for it. The better the quality of the structure, the higher forces and weight it can endure. The best quality structures can withstand winds up to 120 mph (190 km/h) and snow weight to 40 pounds per square yard (21.7 kilograms per square meter).

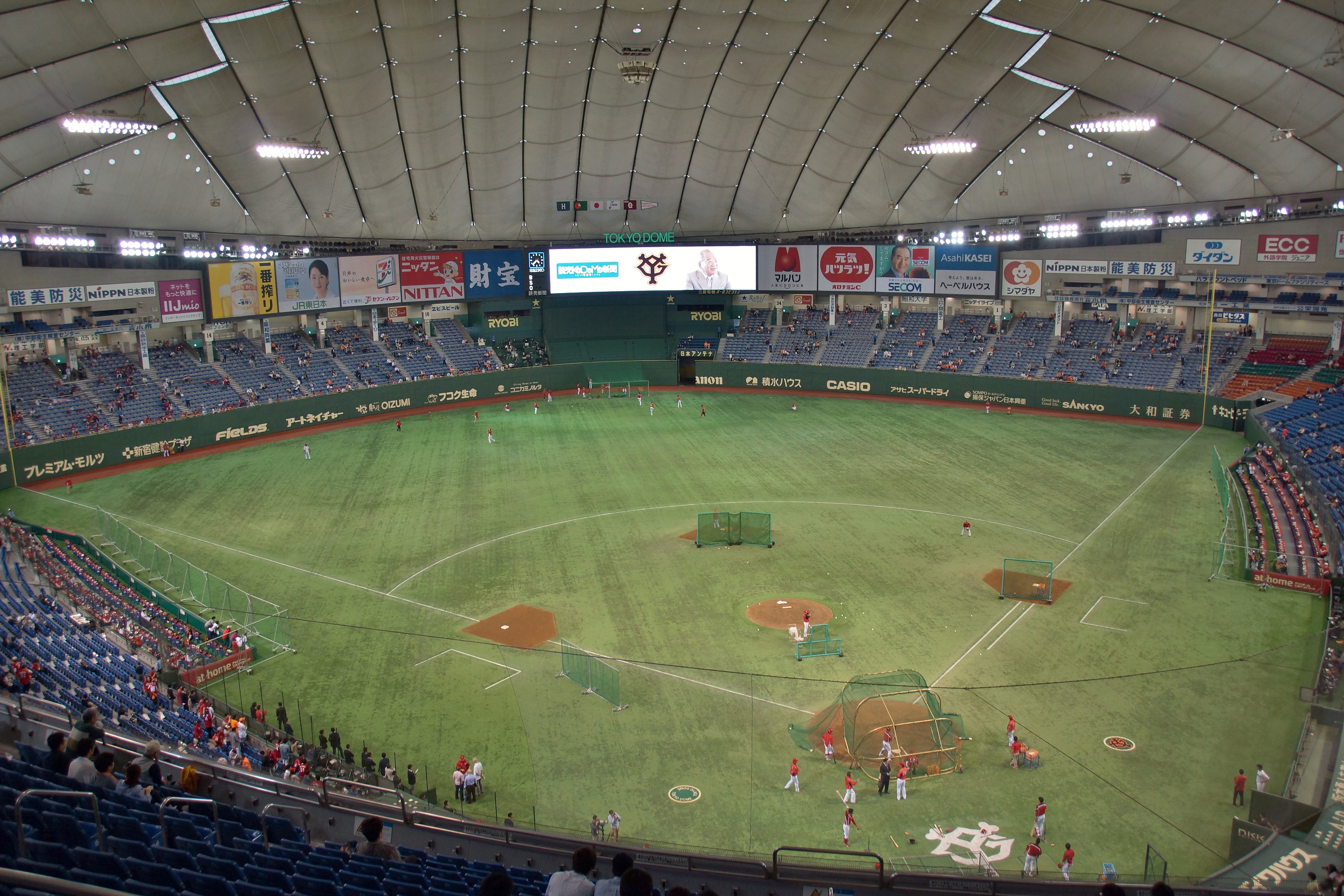
The interior of the Tokyo Dome exemplifies how large an area can be spanned with an air-supported roof.

The air pressure on the envelope is equal to the air pressure exerted on the inside ground, pushing the whole structure up. Therefore, it needs to be securely anchored to the ground (or to the substructure in a roof-only design).

For wide span structures cables are required for anchoring and stabilization. Anchoring requires ballast (weights). Early anchoring designs incorporated sand bags, concrete blocks, bricks, or the like, typically placed around the perimeter on the seal skirt. Most modern design structures use proprietary anchoring systems.

The danger of sudden collapse is nearly negligible, because the structure will gradually deform or sag when subject to a heavy load or force (snow or wind). Only if these warning signs are ignored or not noticed, then the build-up of an extreme load may rupture the envelope, leading to a sudden deflation and collapse.

In hot or cold climates, air conditioning adds to the energy requirement. In venues visited by millions of people per year, energy consumption may be a couple gigajoules per square meter.

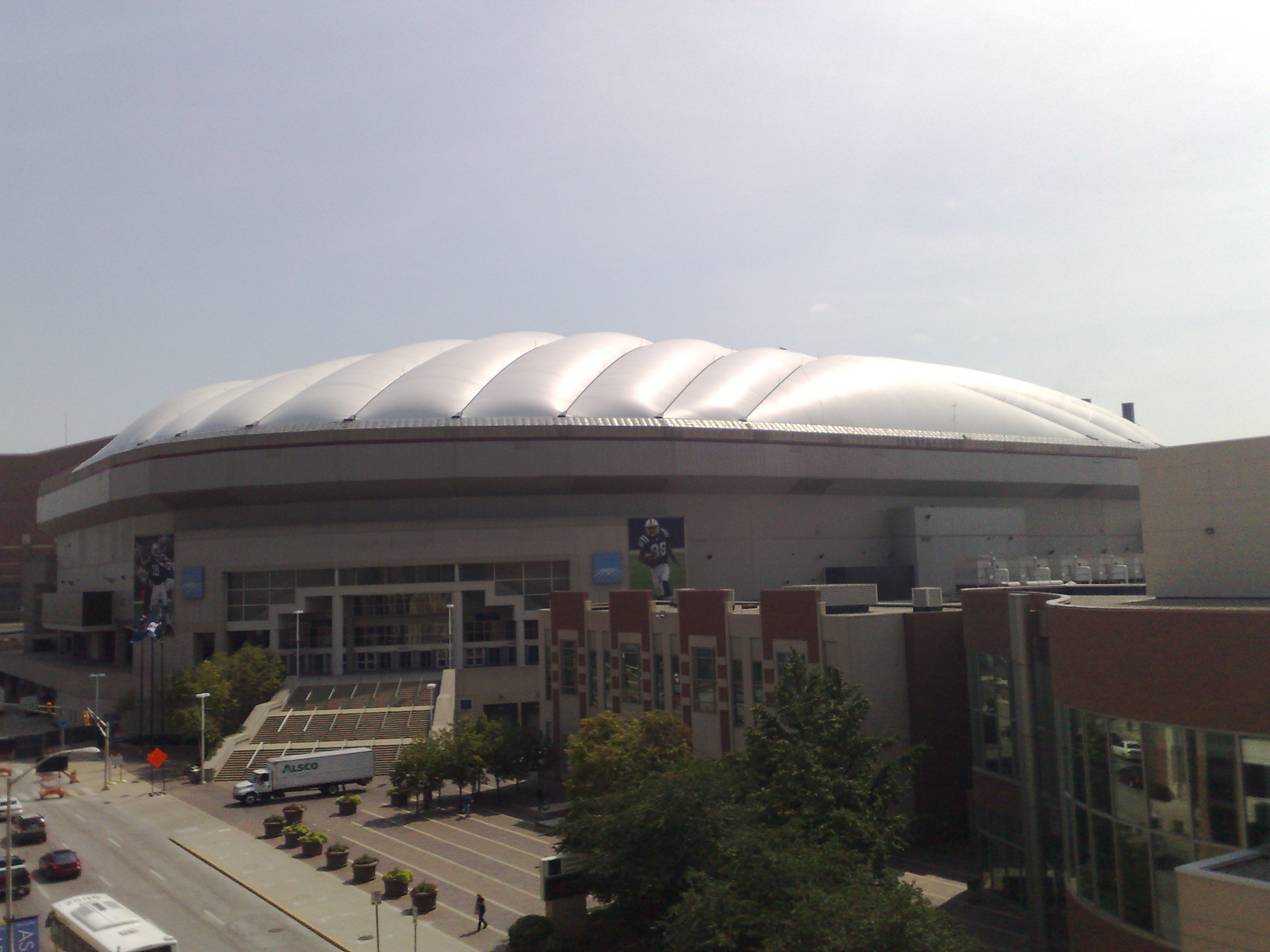
The RCA dome in Indianapolis had an inflatable roof prior to its demolition in 2008.

A common misconception is that these structures are not meant to be permanent facilities, however all major corporations participating in this industry conform to some form of The International Building Codes. To be a permanent facility these domes have to be engineered to the same building codes as a traditional structure.

Air-supported structures or domes are also commonly known as "bubbles".

=== Material ===
The materials used for air-supported structures are similar to those used in tensile structures, namely synthetic fabrics such as fibreglass and polyester. In order to prevent deterioration from moisture and ultraviolet radiation, these materials are coated with polymers such as PVC and Teflon.

Depending on use and location, the structure may have inner linings made of lighter materials for insulation or acoustics. Materials used in modern air supported structures are usually translucent, therefore the use of lighting system inside the structure is often not required during the daytime.

== Air pressure ==
The amount of pressure required for air-supported structures is a function of the weight of the material—and the building systems suspended on it (lighting, ventilation, etc.)—and wind pressure. This amounts to less than 1% above atmospheric pressure. Internal pressure is commonly measured in inches of water (inAq) and varies fractionally from 0.3 inAq for minimal inflation to 3 inAq for maximum, with 1 inAq being a standard pressurization level for normal operating conditions. In terms of the more common pounds per square inch, 1 inAq equates to a mere 0.037 psi (2.54 mBar, 254 Pa),

== Notable air-supported domes ==
=== In operation ===
- Bennett Indoor Athletic Complex, Toms River, New Jersey, United States
- Dalplex (athletics complex), Halifax, Nova Scotia, Canada
- Olympic Training Center Velodrome, Colorado Springs, Colorado, United States
- Edmonton Soccer Dome, Edmonton, Alberta, Canada
- Harry Jerome Sports Center, Burnaby, British Columbia, Canada.
- Krenzler Field, Cleveland State University, Cleveland, Ohio, United States
- Tokyo Dome, Tokyo, Japan
- University of Galway Connacht GAA Air Dome, Carrowclogher, Mayo, Ireland (Note: severely damaged during Storm Éowyn on 24 January 2025 but repaired and reinflated in June 2026)

=== Former notable domes ===
- BC Place, Vancouver, British Columbia, Canada (Formerly the largest air-supported stadium in the world. The roof was changed to a retractable roof in 2011)
- Greater Binghamton Sports Complex, Binghamton, New York, United States. (Roof collapsed in December 2020)
- Burswood Dome, Perth, Western Australia (Demolition commenced June 2013)
- Carrier Dome, Syracuse, New York, United States (air-supported roof was deflated for the final time on March 16, 2020, with a steel frame-supported roof installed that September)
- DakotaDome, Vermillion, South Dakota, United States (air-supported roof was replaced by a steel frame domed roof in 2001)
- Donald N. Dedmon Center, Radford, Virginia, United States (air-supported roof was replaced by a steel truss and fabric roof in 2009)
- Hubert H. Humphrey Metrodome, Minneapolis, Minnesota, United States (Roof deflated January 18, 2014, demolished in February 2014)
- O'Connell Center, Gainesville, Florida, United States (air-supported roof was replaced by a steel frame-supported roof in 1998)
- RCA Dome, Indianapolis, Indiana, United States (demolished in December 2008)
- Pontiac Silverdome, Pontiac, Michigan, United States (deflated in early January 2013; demolished December 2017)
- St. Louis Science Center Exploradome, St. Louis, Missouri, United States (Demolished in 2013)
- UNI-Dome, Cedar Falls, Iowa, United States (air-supported Teflon/Fiberglass roof was replaced with a steel frame-supported stainless steel/fiberglass roof in 1998)
- Yuengling Center (originally USF Sun Dome), Tampa, Florida, United States (air-supported Teflon/Fiberglass roof was replaced with a steel frame-supported roof in 2012)

== Similar concepts ==
- Blimps, the application of this technique to airships, using the pressure differential between their lifting gas and the outside atmosphere to provide structural integrity.
- Balloon tanks, the application of this technique to rockets, using tank pressurization for rigidity.

== See also ==
- Domed city
- Geodesic dome
- Inflatable building
