= Alphie the Alpha Turtle =

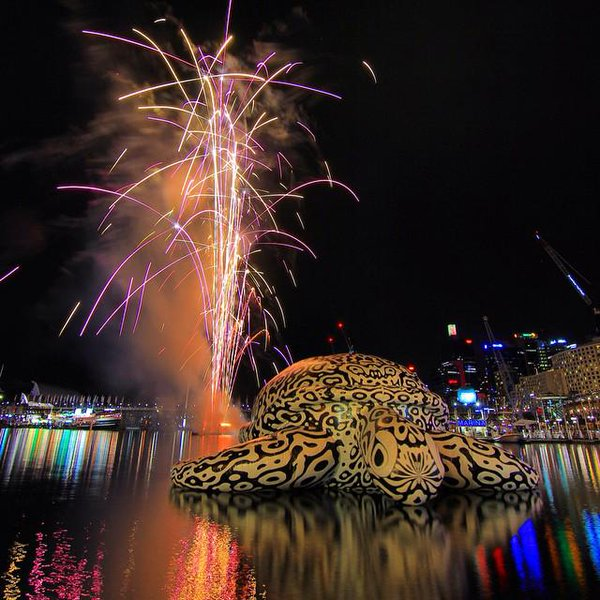
Alphie in Darling Harbour for Sep 2014 as an installation to complement artist BJ Price's Undersea Art Exhibition at the Sydney Sea Life Aquarium

Alphie the Alpha Turtle is an Australian public artwork in the form of a Monumental inflatable sculpture. It is shaped like a sea turtle and is covered with an abstract black and white pattern inspired by the forms of the Great Barrier Reef. It was created by Queensland artist BJ Price and has been exhibited on the water at various locations in Australia, including Port Jackson in 2014 and Currumbin Swell Festival in 2016. Alphie led the Australia Day Parade on Sydney Harbour in 2015. Alphie is 15 metres in length, weighs 375 kilograms and sits 5.5 metres above the water line when inflated.

A smaller version known as "Wee Alphie" has also been displayed and photographed in far north Queensland. Wee Alphie first appeared at BJ Price's World's First Art Exhibition on the Great Barrier Reef.

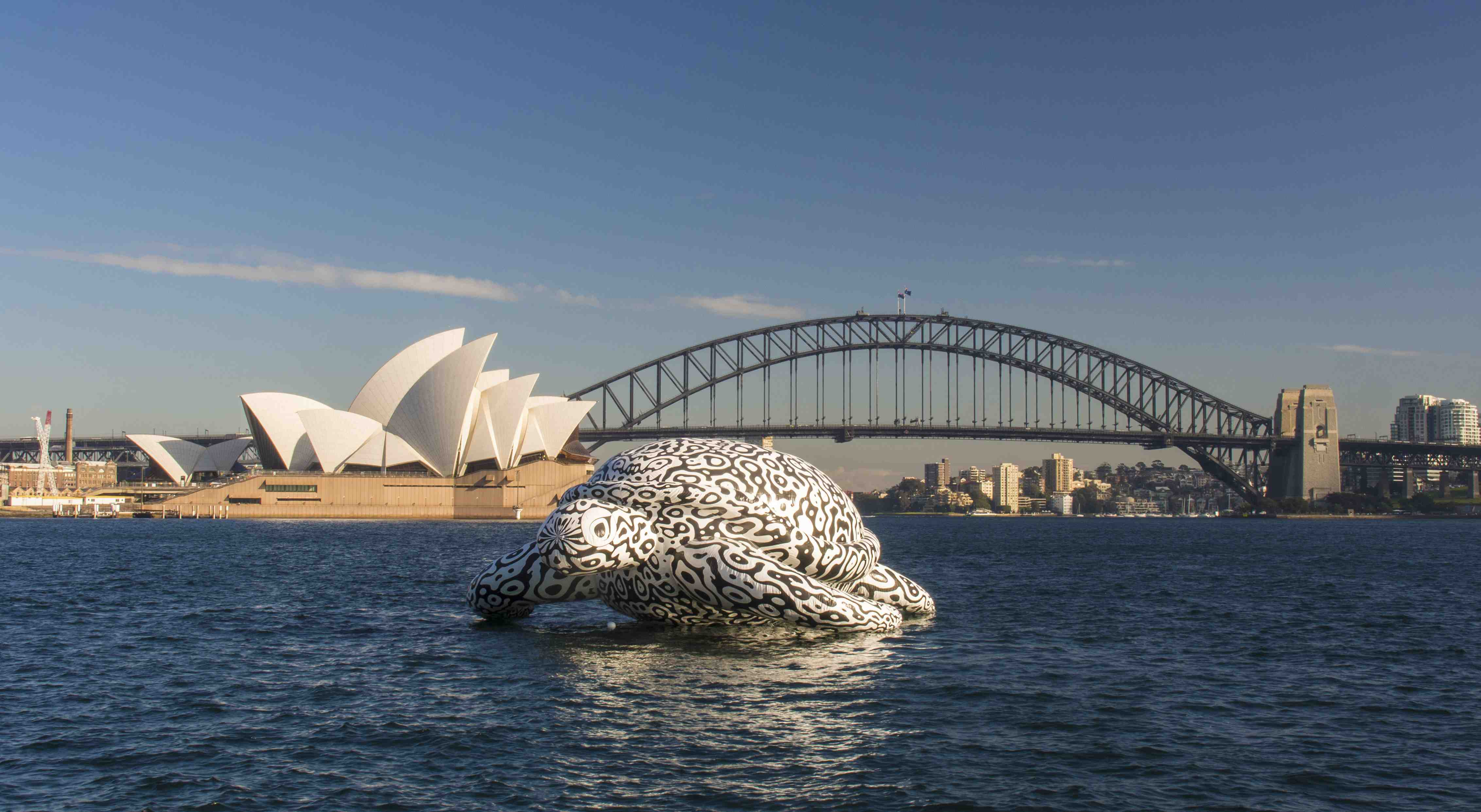
Alphie in Sydney Harbour
