= Air Swimmer =

Toy fish

An Air Swimmer is an inflatable flying remote control toy fish manufactured by the William Mark Corporation (who later created Feisty Pets), which realistically swims indoors through the air.

== Recognition ==
The inventor, Blake English, won the “Rising Star Inventor” award at the 2011 Toy and Game Inventor Conference (TAGIE) Awards The toy itself won the "Best New Product” award at the 23rd 2011 Kite Trade Association International Show. It also featured in Episode 2 of the 2011 On the Verge technology news entertainment show.

The first toys of this type were flying shark and clown fish. At the 2012 Toy Industry Association fair the skies were patrolled by Angry Birds. In 2012 a Zombie Shark was added to the toy line.
