= Inflatable movie screen =

Inflatable apparatus for displaying a projected image

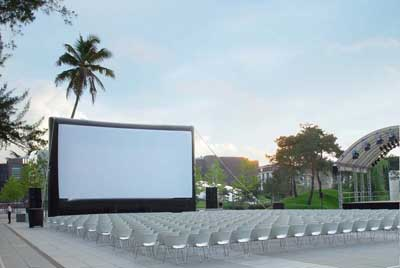
Example of an open air cinema using an inflatable screen

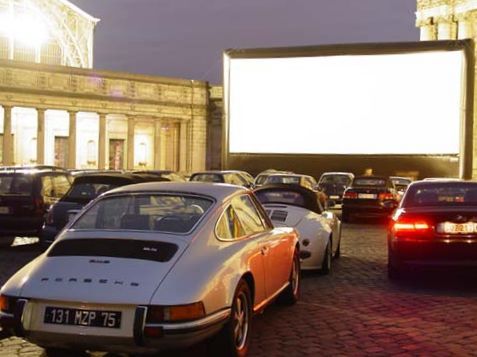
Drive-in theater using an inflatable screen

An inflatable movie screen is an inflatable framework with an attached projection screen. It was invented by the German engineer Günter Ganzevoort. Inflatable screens are used for outdoor movies, film festivals, drive-in theaters, sports, social, fundraising and other events requiring outdoor projection.

== Design ==
The projection frame is made from PVC-coated fabric layers joined by high-frequency welding or mechanical sewing. The projection surface can be made of PVC or spandex, with the latter providing for rear projection capabilities. The projection surface can be detachable for ease of care. The frame is inflated with a high-pressure air blower. Larger frames may require a three-phase blower. For bigger screens, the blower typically continues to operate, ensuring the screen remains fully inflated. With some brands, screen sizes up to 7m or 24ft width do not require a constantly operating air blower.

Screens can be held upright with help of a supporting structure (A-frame or inflatable legs) or with the system of straps and counterweights.

In comparison to traditional and heavy steel constructions, inflatable screens can be set up in a few hours or less, with the smallest screens taking one minute to inflate. This can be useful for environments where wind may be a factor. This is one of the major drawbacks of an inflatable screen. Even a small wind can make these fly like a kite without proper anchoring. Inflatable screens can be deflated quickly adding to their safety. Inflatable screens are lightweight and highly portable compared to other structures used to support screens like a truss or scaffold. A 16-metre-wide (52 ft) screen usually fits on a single pallet. A truss or steel system takes up an entire truck. Inflatable screens reach sizes up to 560 square metres (6,000 ft^{2}). The noise of the blowers is reduced significantly by noise cancelling blowers.

== See also ==
- List of inflatable manufactured goods
- Outdoor cinema
