= Jetted =

Jetted can mean:

- In the context of civil engineering, Cable jetting
- In the context of clothing, adorned with Jet (lignite) or similar black beading
- In the context of clothing, equipped with jetted pockets
