= Jetting =

Jetting may refer to:

- Cable jetting
- Jetting (injection moulding defect)
- Jettin', a 2023 single by The Jet Boy Bangerz from Exile Tribe
