= Cable blowing machine =

A cable blowing machine (also known as a fiber blowing machine) is a machine designed to fit fiber optic cables into telecommunication ducts and microducts with the use of compressed air or water.

== Blowing machine design ==
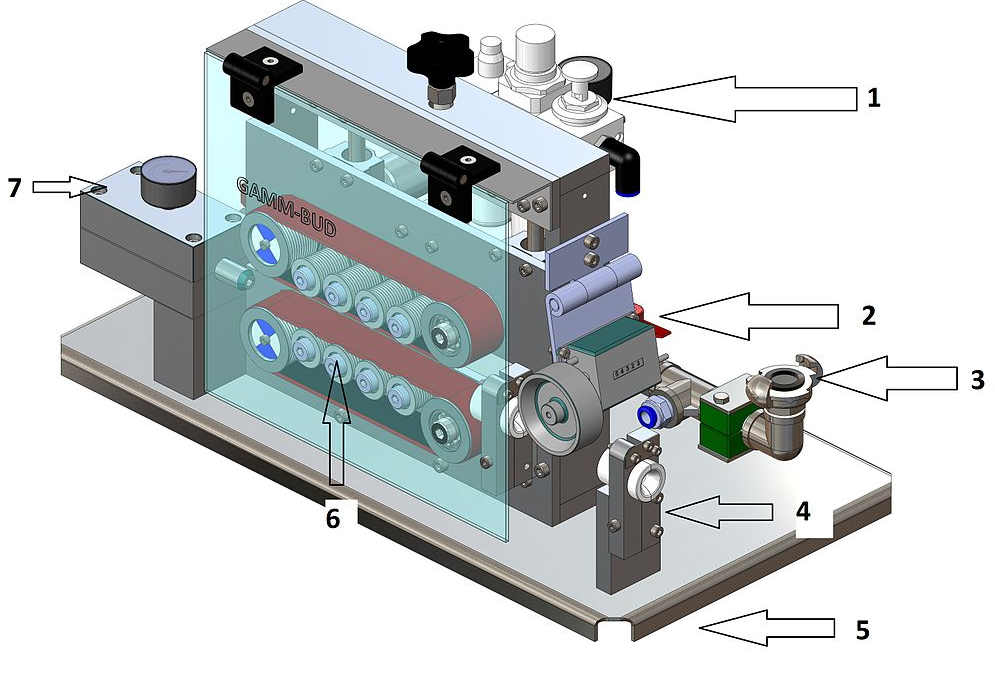
Cable blowing machine: 1. adjustment and lubrication system; 2. cable meter counter; 3. compressed air connection; 4. cable guidance; 5. base plate; 6. belt feeder; 7. blowing head

A cable blowing machine (fiber blowing machine) consists of the following components:

- a head that ensures secure fitting of the duct into which the cable will be blown and supplying the medium (air or water) to the duct. The cable inserted into the duct via the head goes through a sealing system preventing the medium from getting into the machine;
- a belt feeder that moves the cable towards the head;
- a base plate or a frame onto which the blowing machine's subsystems are mounted;
- cable guidance, that is a system of bushes or rolls guiding the cable towards the blowing head;
- air or water connections that supply the medium securely to the blowing machine;
- a meter counter that shows the length (sometimes also the velocity) of the blown cable;
- a control unit that allows to control the speed of cable insertion and the propelling power of the feeder.

== Types of blowing machines ==
Blowing machines are classified with regard to the diameter of the cable they can handle and the type of drive system (track feeder, roller feeder, belt feeder or blowing heads without feeders). The optical fiber cable blowing machine are of 2 types.

1. Hydraulically powered
2. Pneumatically powered.

The hydraulically blowing machine consists of 2 parts.

1. Cable feeding unit: - This is the main component of blowing machine and it pushes the cable into the HDPE duct with the help of compressed air.
2. Hydraulic Power pack: - This unit provides the power to cable feeding unit and it is because of hydraulic power pack, the cable feeding unit operates.

The commonly used is hydraulically powered one.

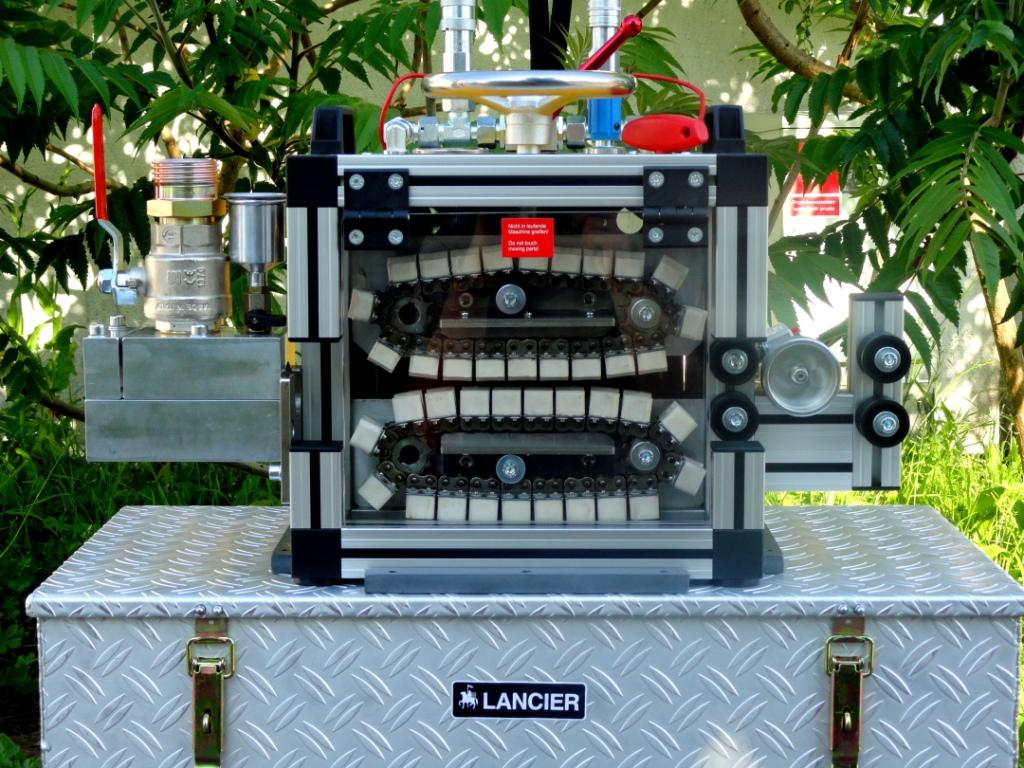
blowing machine with a track feeder

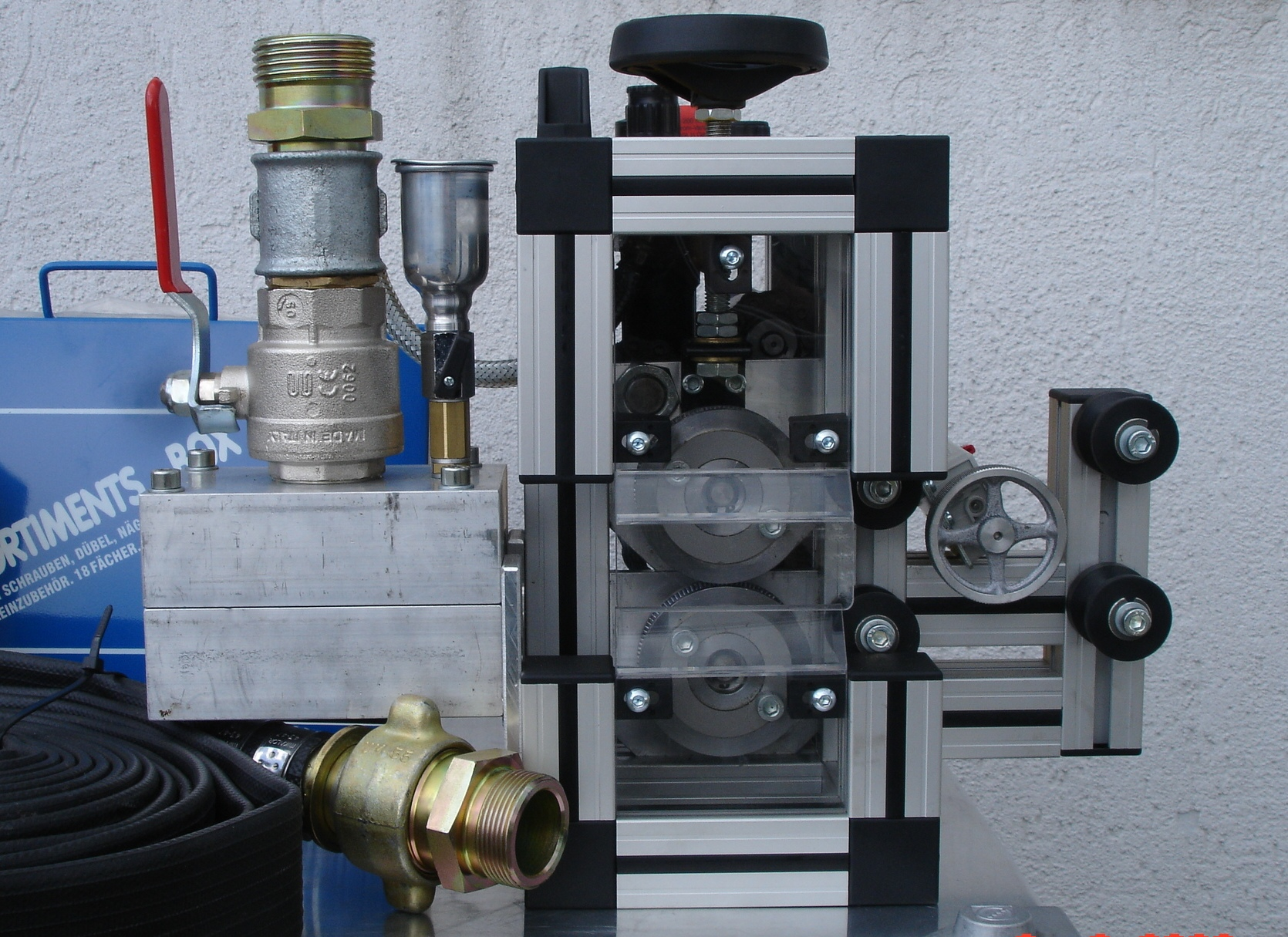
blowing machine with roller feeder

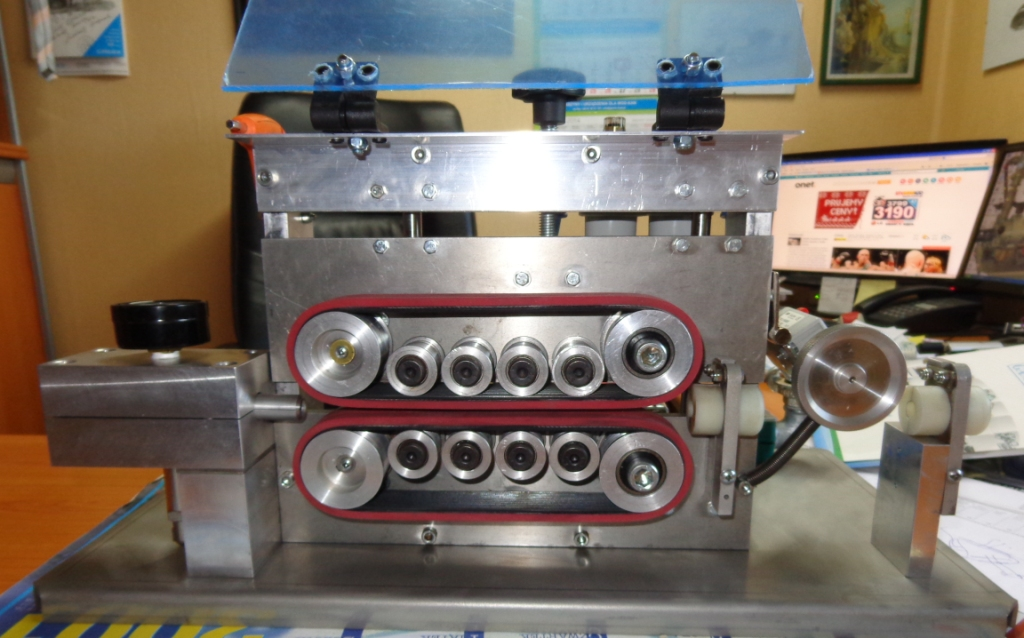
blowing machine with a belt feeder

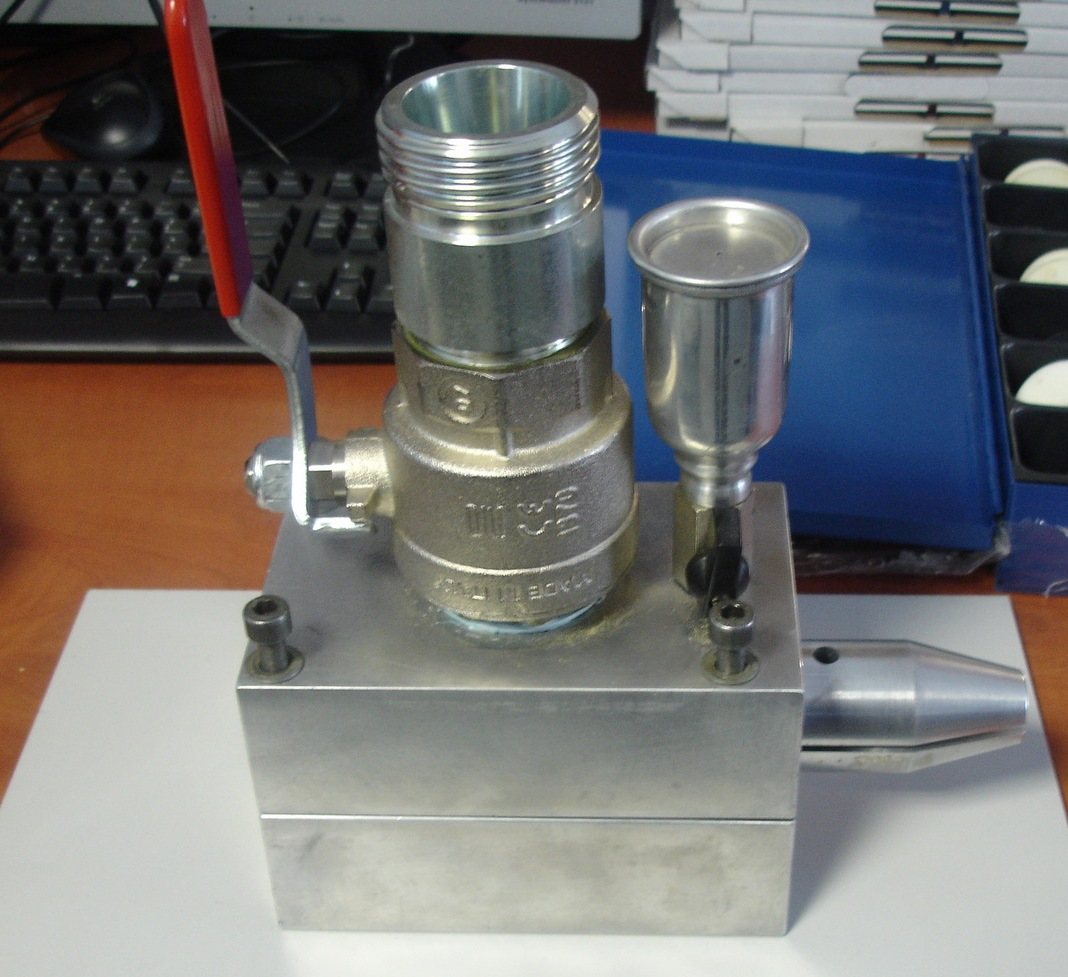
blowing head
