= Bladder (disambiguation) =

The bladder (or urinary bladder) is an organ that collects urine for excretion in animals.

Bladder may also refer to:

== Biology ==
- Artificial urinary bladder, in humans
- Gallbladder, which stores bile for digestion
- Pig bladder, urinary bladder of a domestic pig, with many human uses
- Swim bladder, in bony fishes, an internal organ that helps to control buoyancy (homologous to lungs)
- Urinary bladder (Chinese medicine)

== Technology ==
- Air bladder effect, a special effect used in filmmaking
- Fuel bladder, which stores fuels or other industrial liquids
- Hydration system, sometimes known as a bladder
- Pneumatic bladder, an old technology with many industrial applications
- Waterskin, a traditional container for transporting water

== Geography ==
- Bladder Lake, a lake in Minnesota
