= Winepress =

Device used to extract juice from grapes

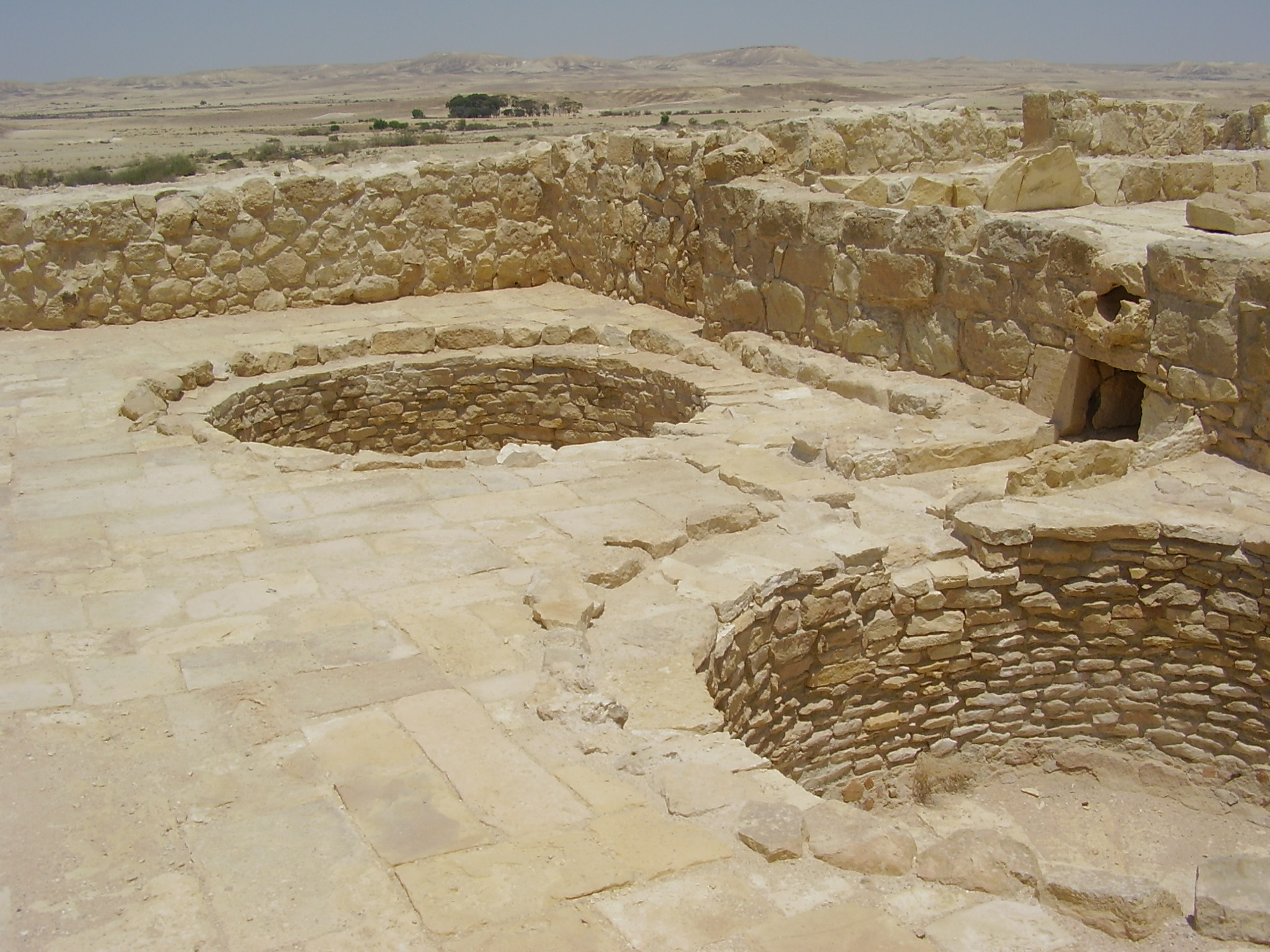
Byzantine-period winepress from Shivta (Sobota), Israel, with treading floor and collection vats

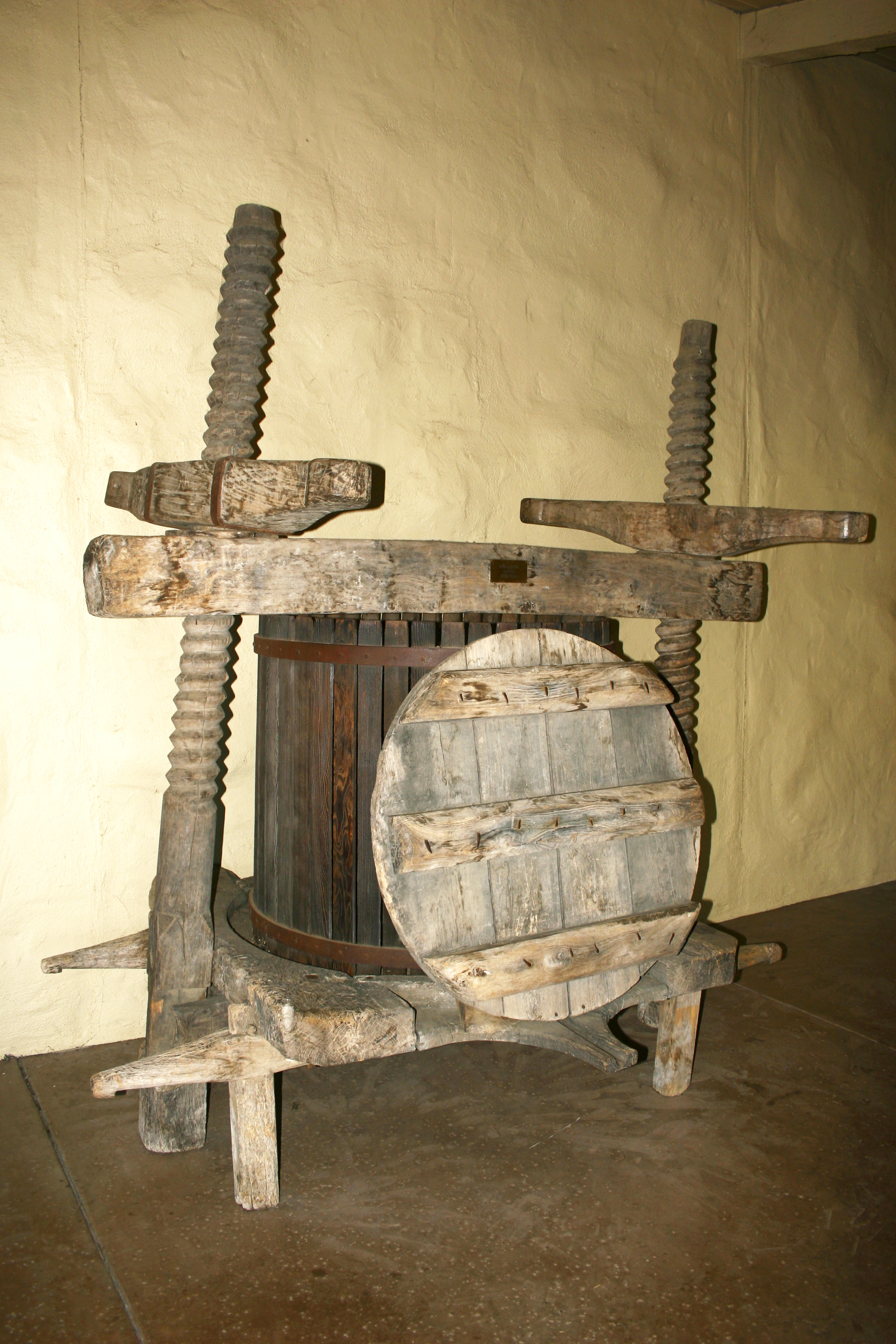
16th-century winepress

A winepress is a device used to extract juice from crushed grapes during winemaking. There are a number of different styles of presses that are used by wine makers but their overall functionality is the same. Each style of press exerts controlled pressure in order to free the juice from the fruit (most often grapes). The pressure must be controlled, especially with grapes, in order to avoid crushing the seeds and releasing a great deal of undesirable tannins into the wine. Wine was being made at least as long ago as 4000 BC; in 2011, a winepress was unearthed in Armenia with red wine dated 6,000 years old.

== Press types ==
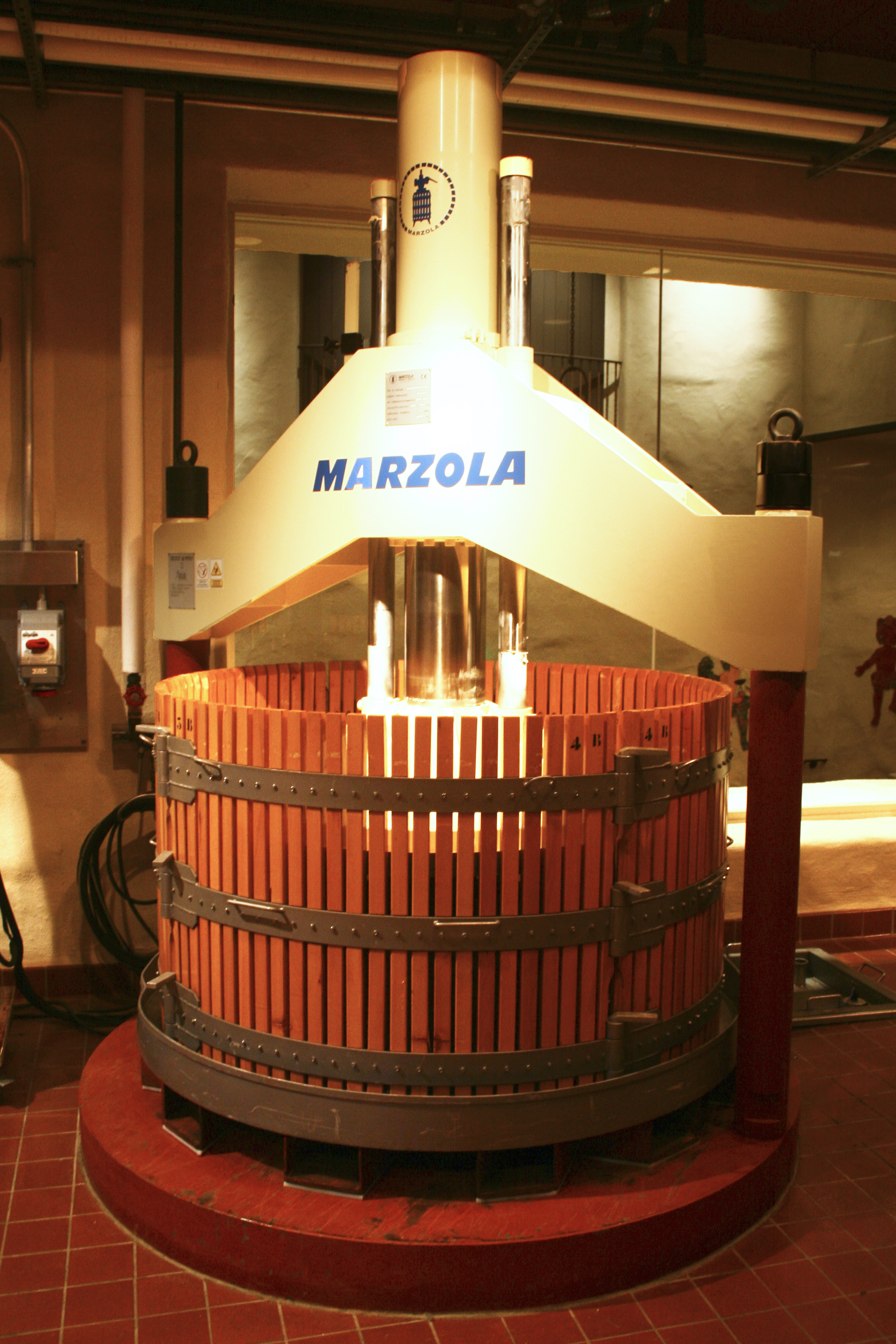
Modern winepress

=== Basket ===
A basket press consists of a large basket filled with the crushed grapes. Pressure is applied through a plate that is forced down onto the fruit. The mechanism to lower the plate is often either a screw or a hydraulic device. The juice flows through openings in the basket. The basket style press was the first type of mechanized press to be developed. Its basic design has not changed in nearly 10,000 years.

=== Horizontal screw ===
A horizontal screw press works using the same principle as the basket press. Instead of a plate being brought down to put pressure on the grapes, plates from either side of a closed cylinder are brought together to squeeze the grapes. Generally the volume of grapes handled is significantly greater than that of a basket press.

=== Bladder ===
A bladder press consists of a large cylinder, closed at each end, into which the fruit is loaded. To press the grapes, a large bladder expands and pushes the grapes against the sides. The juice then flows out through small openings in the cylinder. The cylinder rotates during the process to help homogenize the pressure that is placed on the grapes.

=== Continuous screw ===
A continuous screw press differs from the above presses in that it does not process a single batch of grapes at a time. Instead it uses an Archimedes' screw to continuously force grapes up against the wall of the device. Juice is extracted, and the pomace continues through to the end where it is extracted. This style of press is rarely used to produce table wines, and some countries forbid its use for higher quality wines.

=== Flash release ===
Flash release is a technique used in winepressing. The treatment consists of heating the grapes with steam almost to boiling and then submitting them to a strong vacuum. The technique allows for a better extraction of phenolic compounds.

== Gallery ==
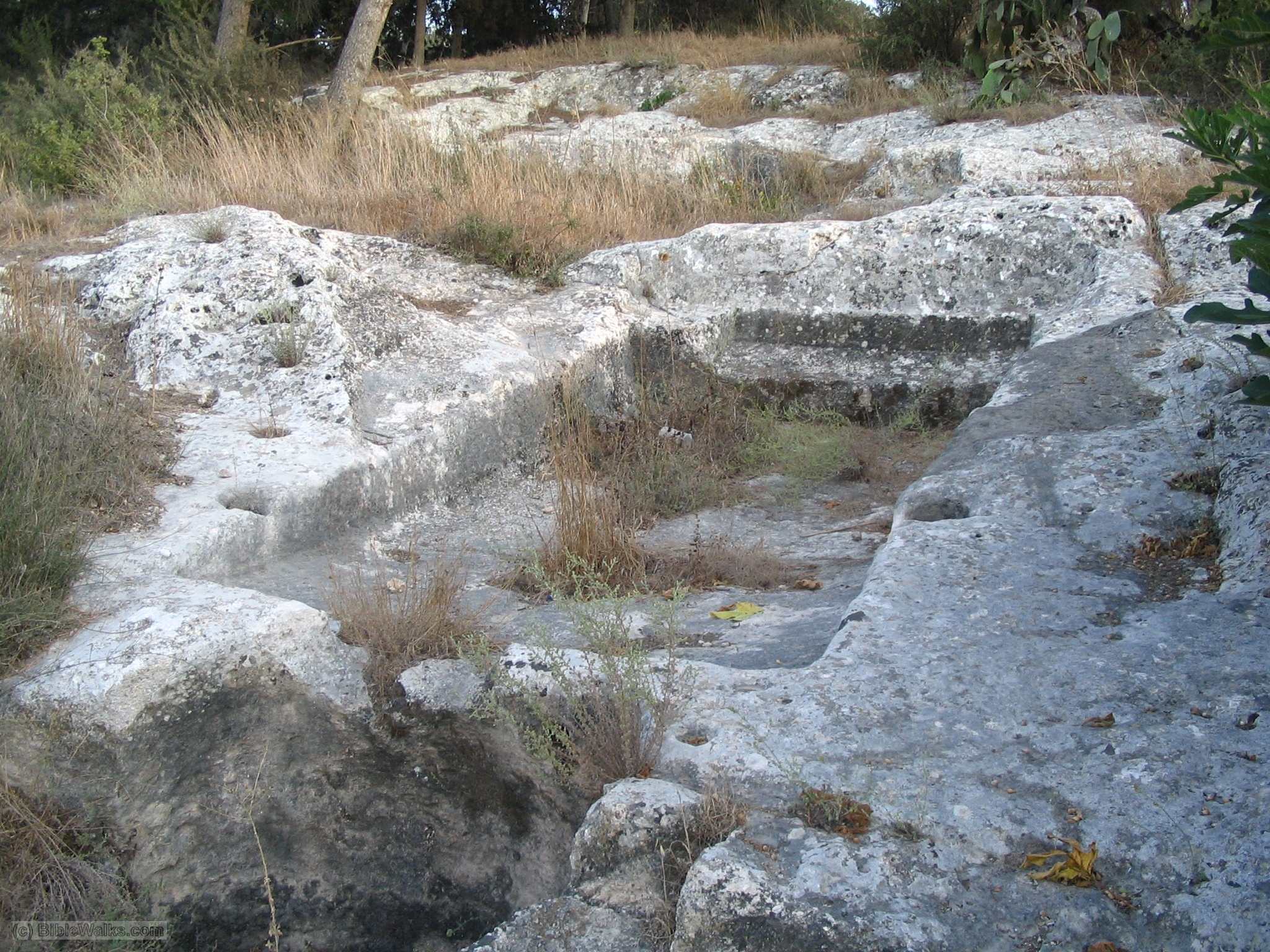
Ancient winepress in Israel with the pressing area in the center and the collection vat off to the bottom left.

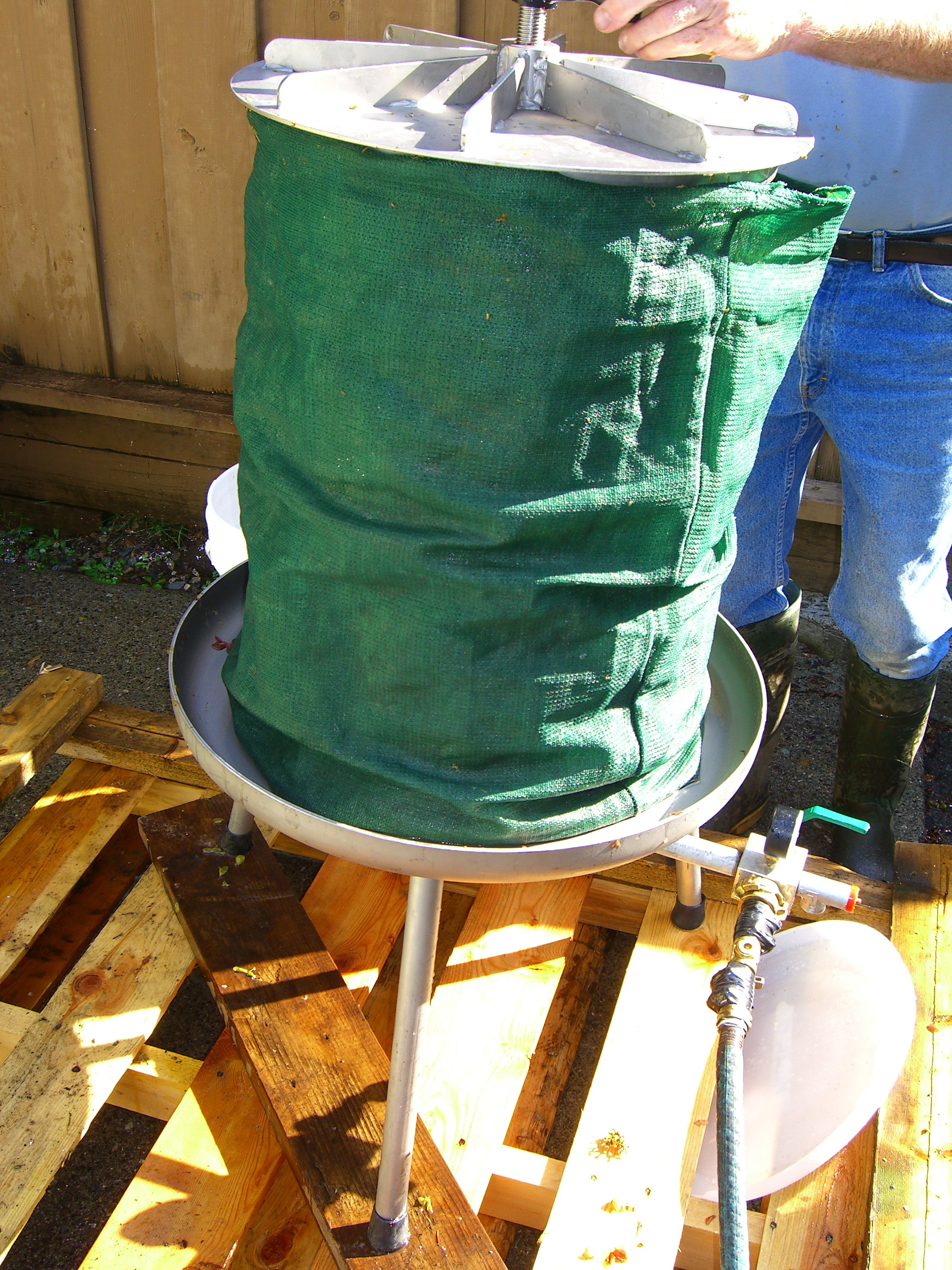
A bladder press

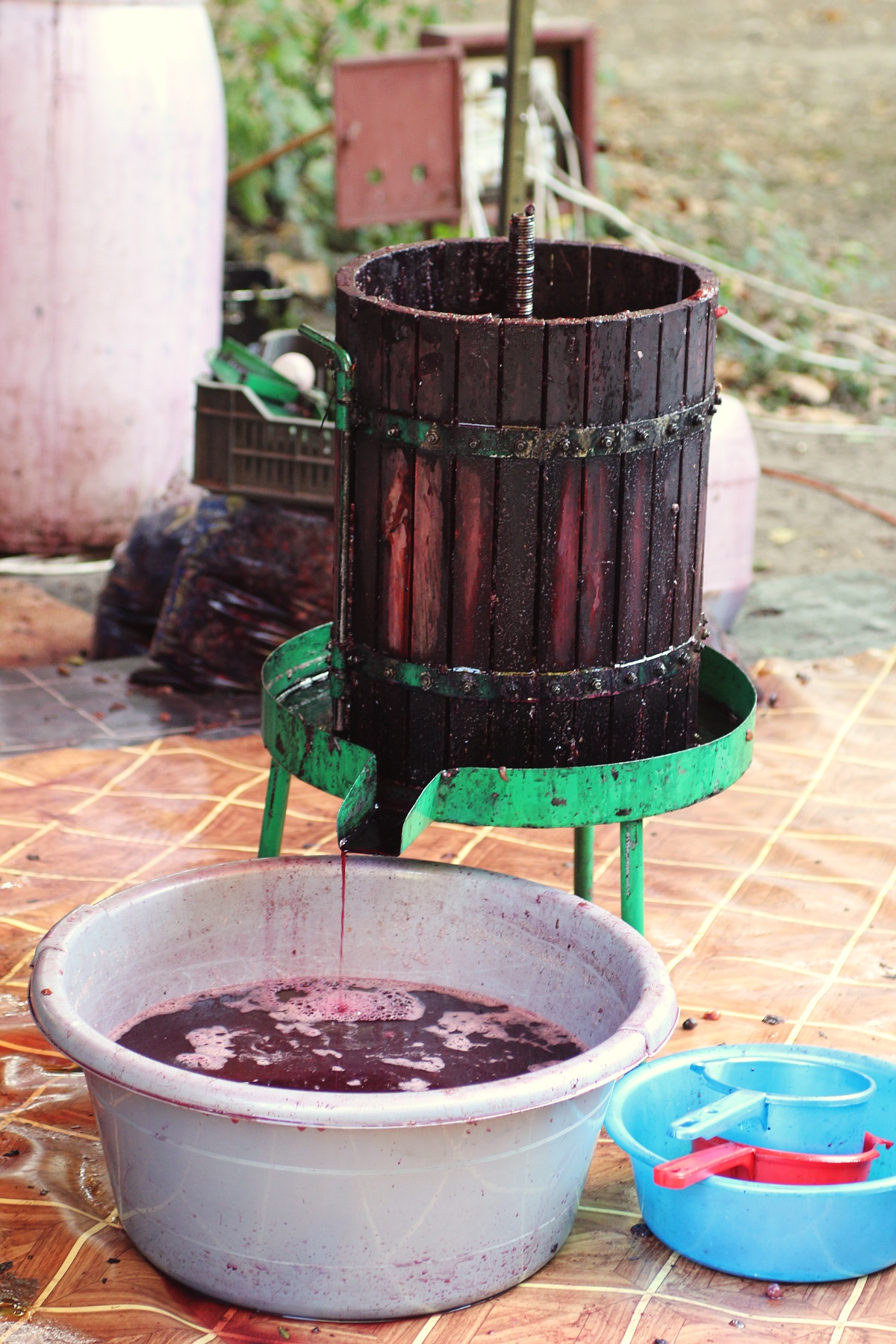
Old style press in Romania for home-made wine

Workings of a winepress (1700s in Ravensburg, Germany)

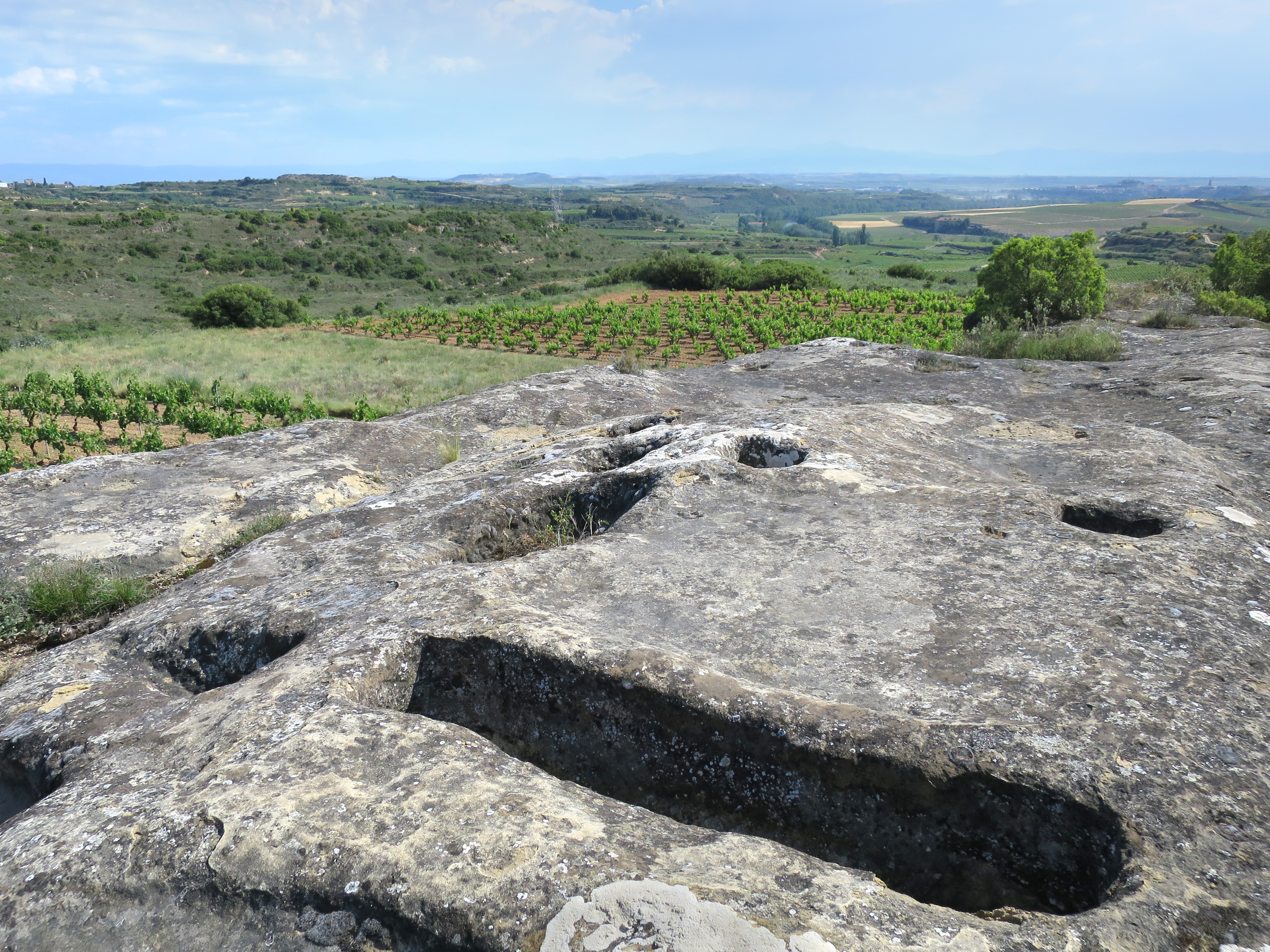
Remains of a medieval winepress in the Rioja Alavesa

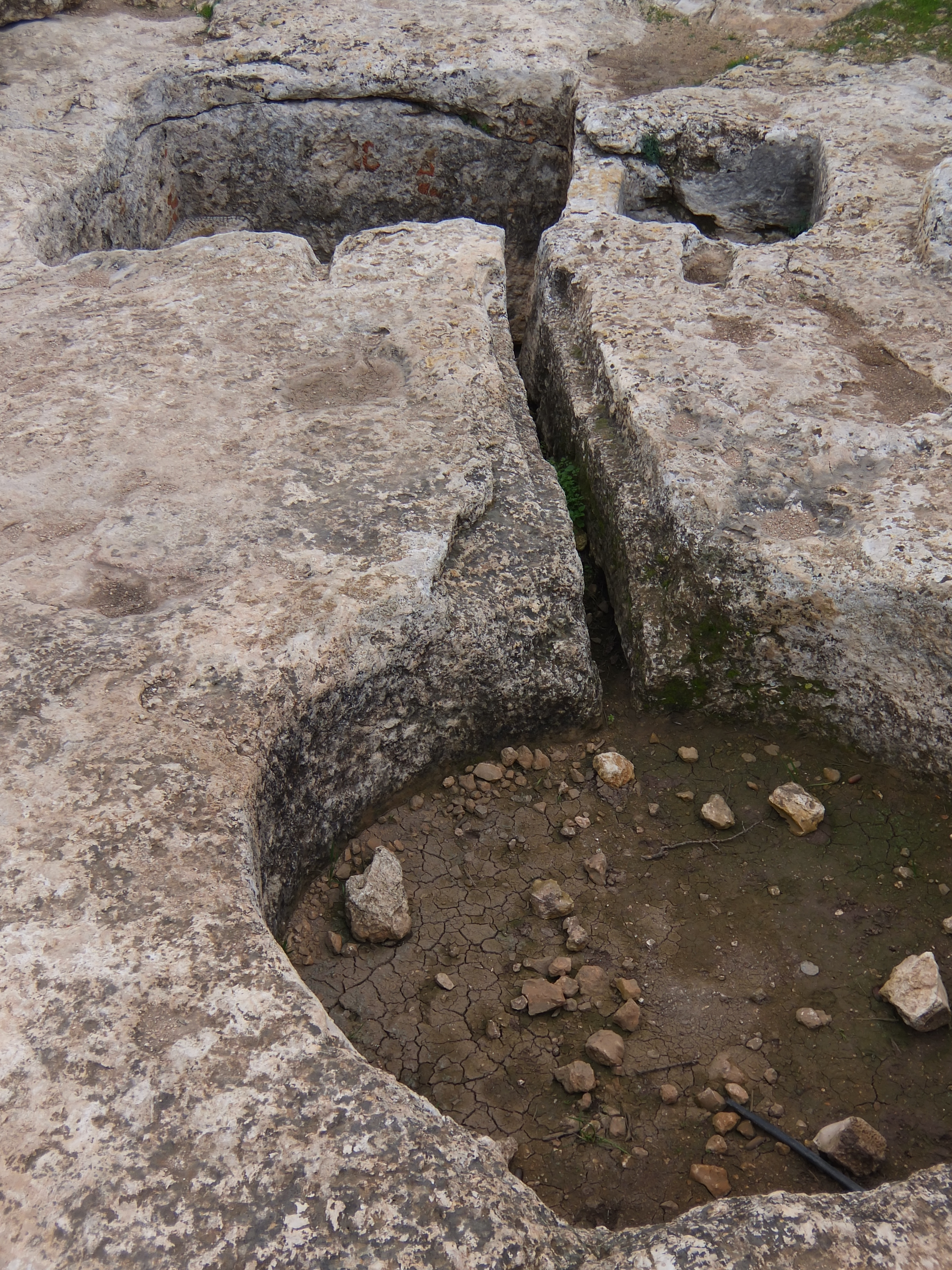
Ancient winepress carved into the ground at Hurvat Itri, Israel

== See also ==
- History of the winepress
- Grape stomping
- Pressing (wine)
