= Pneumatic non-return valve =

Pneumatic non-return valves are used where a normal non-return valve would be ineffective. This is for example where there is a risk of flood water entering a site but an equal risk of pollution or a chemical spills leaving a site and polluting the environment.

Pneumatic non-return valves are installed below ground and can be used to pneumatically lock the non-return valve closed thus containing a site in the event of a spill.

It is common practice to lock sites using pneumatic non-return valves during the loading or transferring of chemicals or hazardous waste. Pneumatic non-return valves have a longer service life when compared to pneumatic bladder systems.
