= Dunnage bag =

Bags used to secure and stabilize cargo

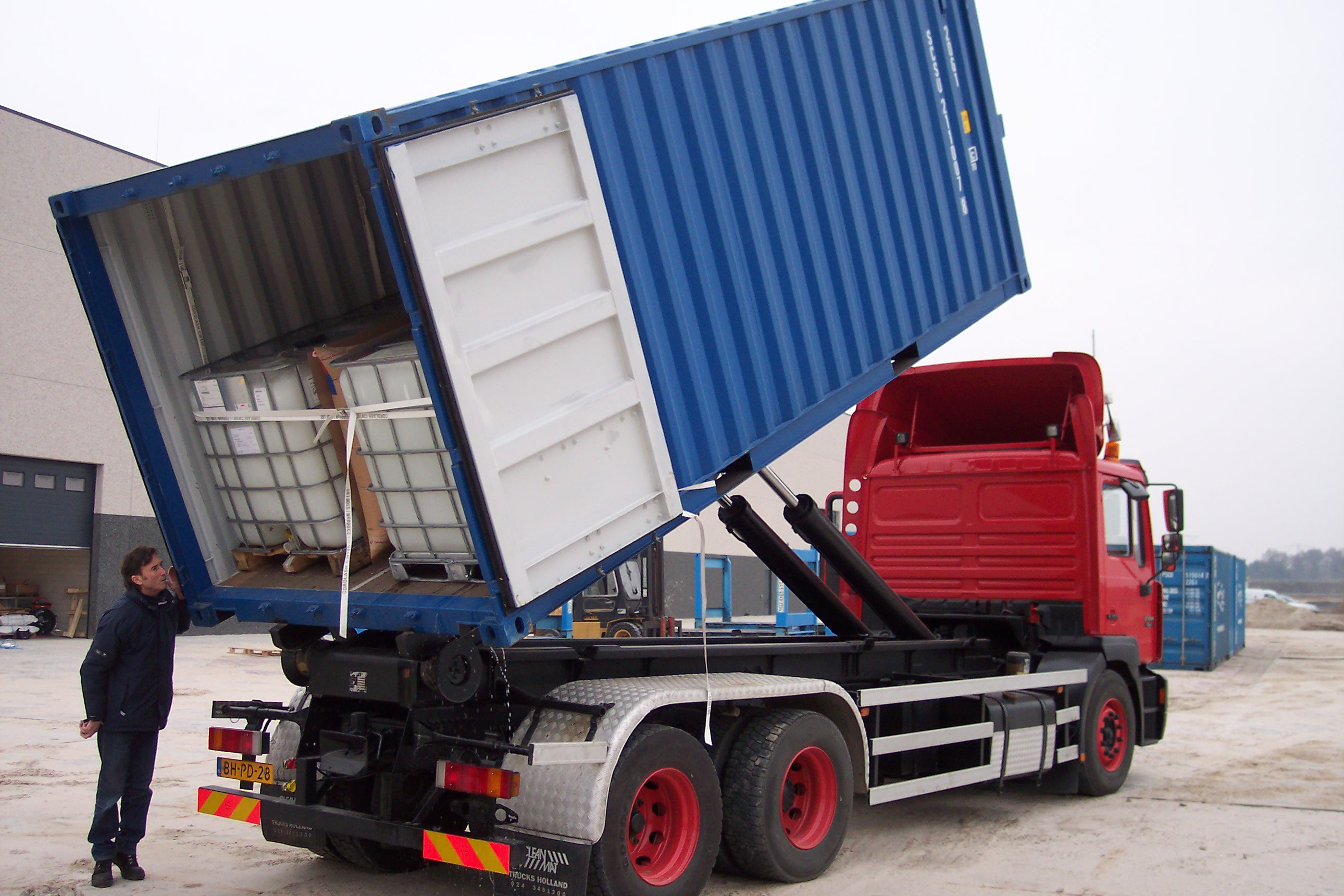
Stabilizing capabilities in container

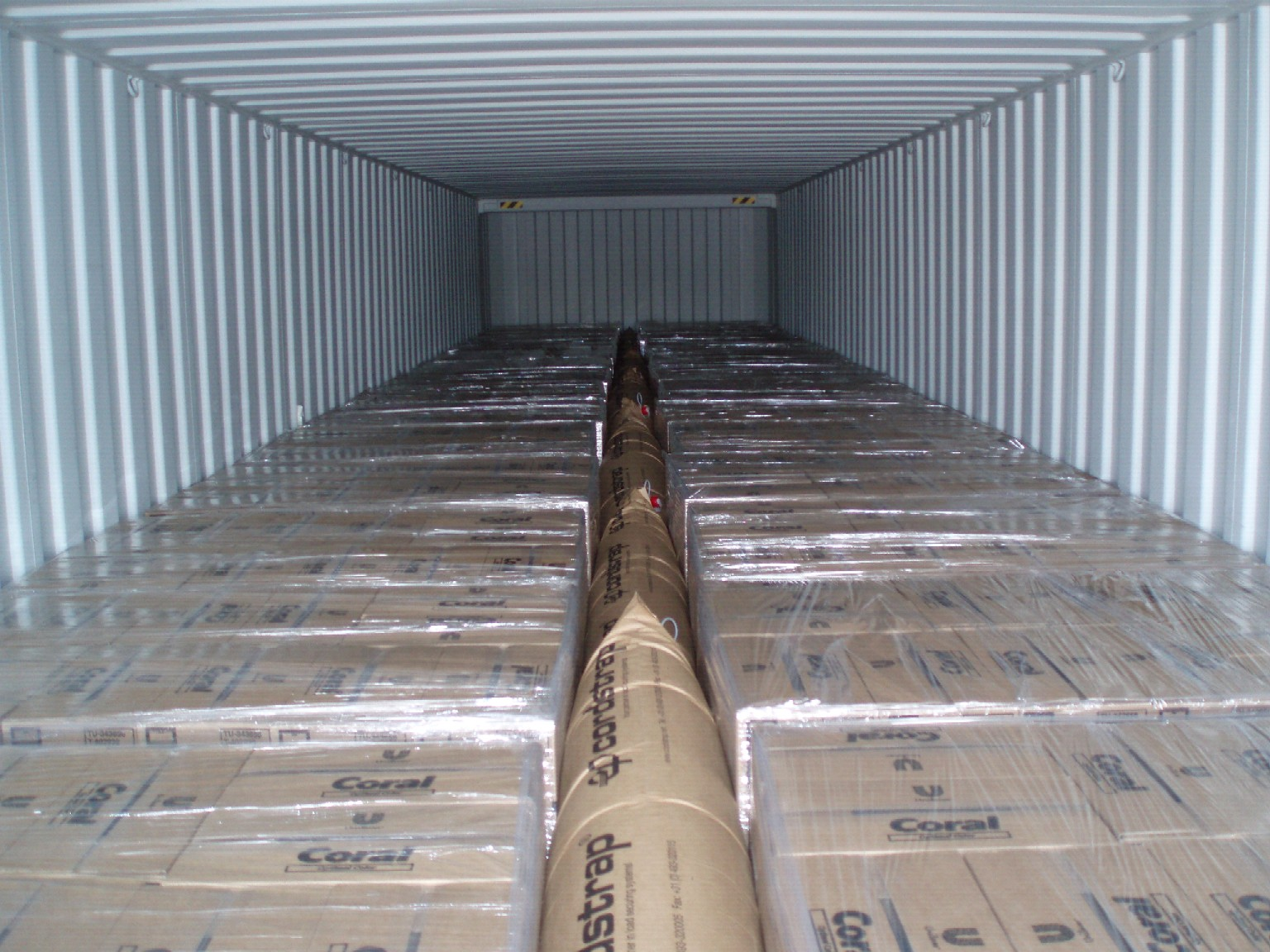
Application in container

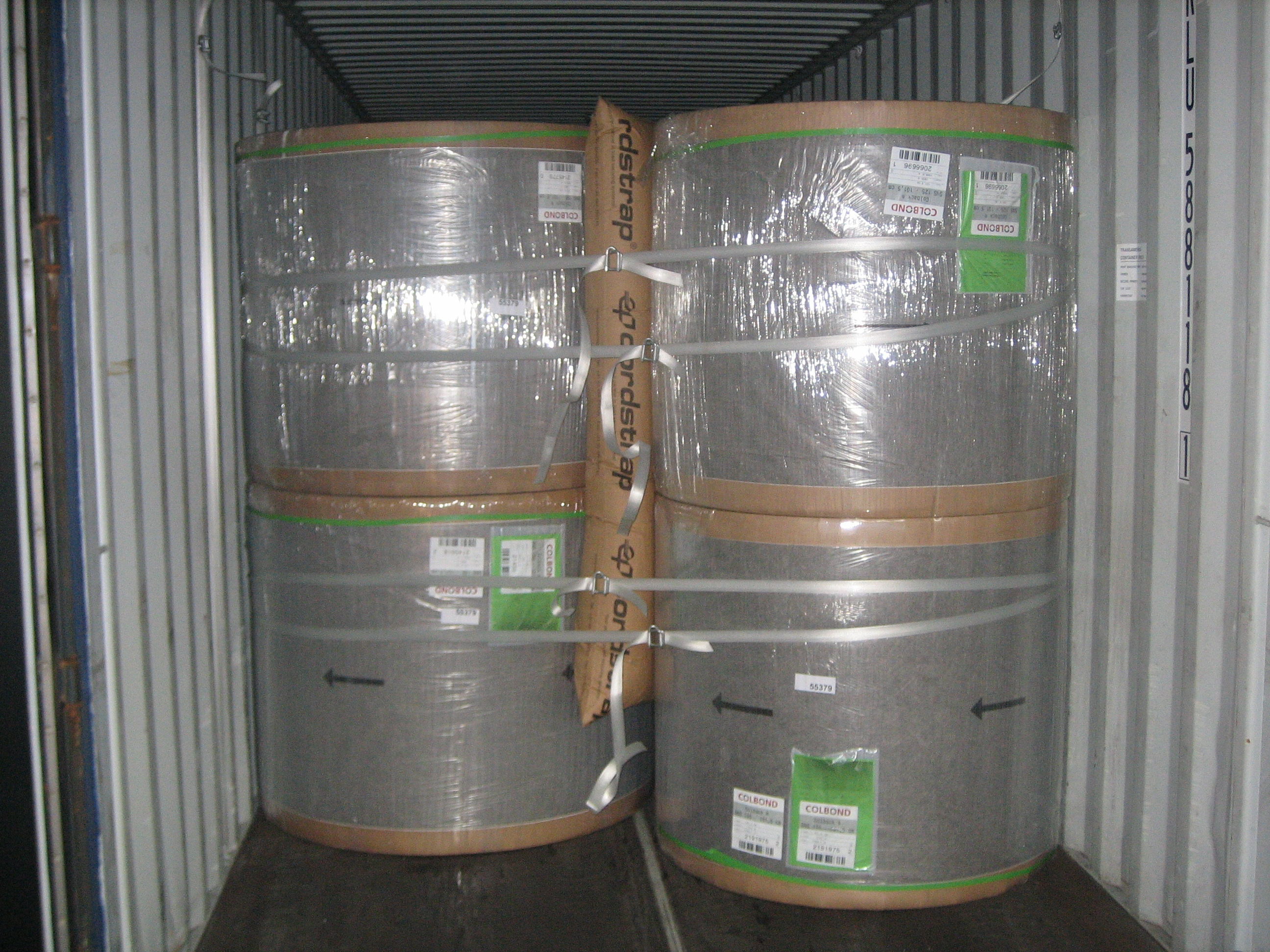
Application in container

Dunnage bags, also known as airbags, and inflatable bags, are used to secure and stabilize cargo.

Introduced around 1970, dunnage bags provide convenient and cost-effective cargo stabilization in ISO sea containers, closed railcars, trucks, and oceangoing vessels. As improperly secured cargo is a safety hazard, dunnage bags improve road safety. According to the European Commission's Directorate-General for Mobility and Transport, "up to 25% of accidents involving trucks can be attributable to inadequate cargo securing".

== Usage ==
Dunnage airbags consist of closed chambers made from an elastic film filled with air. These are placed in the void between the cargo to stabilize, secure, and protect it during transportation. The quantity of inflation air may be varied in accordance with the particular properties and requirements of the package contents.

Dunnage bags are commercially available in various sizes and designs, including spheres, rectangles, corner and edge cushions, and tubular cushions. Therefore, almost any type of cargo can be secured with them, including break bulk and palletized cargo, coils, barrels, cases, and crates.

Dunnage bags are very safe to use for both the shipping and receiving end of transportation, and are waterproof. They inflate rapidly with compressed air, and are easy to install; compressed air is often available through an outlet in the truck's compressed air system.

Important in the use of dunnage bags is that the size of the bag is determined by the void. If this does not match, the bags will not do their work properly, with potential large damage to cargo and people. For air cushions, it is important to avoid damage as a result of wear and tear. Air cushions should never be used as fillers against doors or any non-rigid surfaces or partitions.

== Environmental impact ==
Some bags can be reused, and are ultimately recyclable. To reuse the dunnage bag, it needs to be undamaged and equipped with a screw-on quick fill valve. For single use, the bag is equipped with a quick-fill one-way safety valve. Inflatable air cushions are available both as disposable items and as recyclable products.

== Types ==
=== Paper dunnage bags (kraft) ===
Paper dunnage bags are made out of two components, an inner component that consists of a polyethylene inner bag, the outer component is a paper bag. The outer bag is made of the highest quality, light weight kraft paper of high tensile strength. The bags come in different strengths and varieties and can be made in any special size. The inner component provides optimum pressure, and the outer component provides optimum strength. For use in the chemical industry, paper bags can be polycoated. A polycoat will make the bag resistant to specific chemicals.

=== Woven polypropylene bags ===
Woven polypropylene bags are extremely durable and can be used in dry and wet conditions. These bags are best for extreme heavy loads. Poly woven airbags have greater elasticity than paper dunnage airbags for more surface contact with the pallets. The woven material provides greater tear strength and superior moisture resistance than most other dunnage bag materials. Poly woven airbags typically have greater reusability due to their durability and are recyclable.

=== Polypropylene paper laminated bags ===
The paper used on the outside of the bag is laminated on the inside with a woven polypropylene layer, which allows higher resistance to punctures and moisture.

== Disadvantages ==
Dunnage bags are susceptible to damage from pointed and sharp articles such as nails.

== See also ==
- Inflatable air cushion
- List of inflatable manufactured goods
- Pneumatic bladder
