= Pneumatics =

Use of pressurised gas in mechanical systems

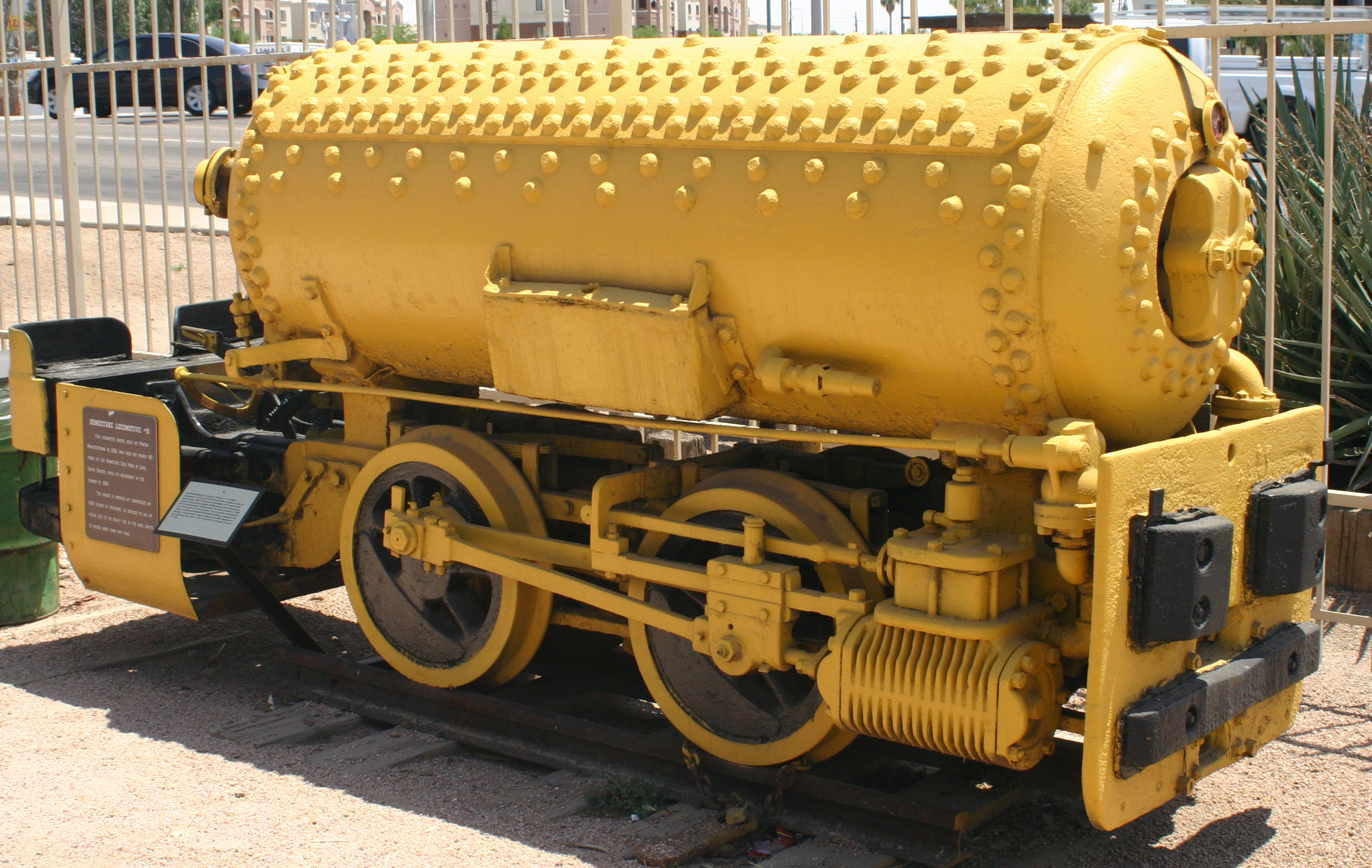
Pneumatic (compressed-air) fireless locomotives like this were often used to haul trains in mines, where steam engines posed a risk of explosion. This one is preserved H.K. Porter, Inc. No. 3290 of 1923.

Pneumatics (from Greek πνεῦμα pneuma 'wind, breath') is the use of gas or pressurized air to create mechanical motion in mechanical systems.

Pneumatic systems used in industry are commonly powered by compressed air or compressed inert gases. A centrally located and electrically powered compressor powers cylinders, air motors, pneumatic actuators, and other pneumatic devices. A pneumatic system controlled through manual or automatic solenoid valves is selected when it provides a lower cost, more flexible, or safer alternative to electric motors, and hydraulic actuators.

Pneumatics also has applications in dentistry, construction, mining, and other areas. In CNC machining, compressed air is used to actuate tool changes and to blow chips and contaminants away from the cutting area.

== History ==
Although the early history of pneumatics is somewhat unclear, blowguns are often considered the earliest pneumatic device, being created independently by various indigenous groups around the world. Bellows are an early form of air compressor used primarily for smelting and forging. Ctesibius of Alexandria is often considered the father of pneumatics, "who worked in the early 3rd century BCE and invented a number of mechanical toys operated by air, water, and steam under pressure." Though no documents written by Ctesibius survive, he is thought to have heavily influenced Philo of Byzantium while writing his work, Mechanical Syntaxis, as well as Vitruvius in De architectura. In the first century BC, the ancient Greek mathematician Hero of Alexandria compiled recipes for dozens of contraptions in his work Pneumatics. It has been speculated that much of this work can be attributed to Ctesibius. The pneumatic experiments described in these ancient documents later inspired the Renaissance inventors of the thermoscope and the air thermometer, devices which relied upon the heating and cooling of air to move a column of water up and down a tube.

German physicist Otto von Guericke (1602–1686) invented the vacuum pump, a device that can draw out air or gas from the attached vessel. He demonstrated the vacuum pump to separate the pairs of copper hemispheres using air pressures.

== Gases used in pneumatic systems ==
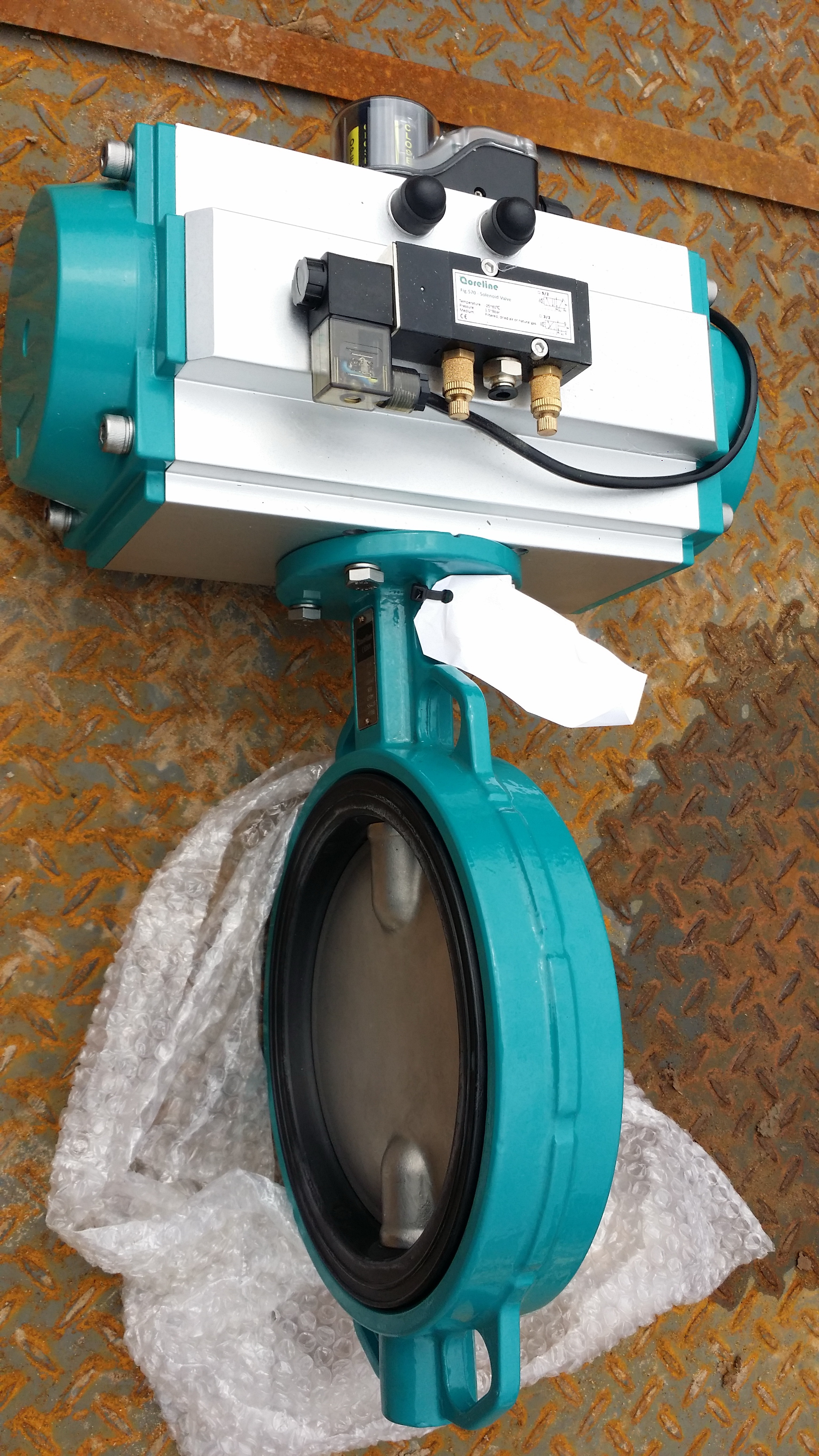
A pneumatic butterfly valve

Pneumatic systems in fixed installations, such as factories, use compressed air because a sustainable supply can be made by compressing atmospheric air. The air usually has moisture removed, and a small quantity of oil is added at the compressor to prevent corrosion and lubricate mechanical components.

Factory-plumbed pneumatic-power users need not worry about poisonous leakage, as the gas is usually just air. Any compressed gas other than air is an asphyxiation hazard—including nitrogen, which makes up 78% of air. Compressed oxygen (approx. 21% of air) would not asphyxiate, but is not used in pneumatically powered devices because it is a fire hazard, more expensive, and offers no performance advantage over air. Smaller or stand-alone systems can use other compressed gases that present an asphyxiation hazard, such as nitrogen—often referred to as OFN (oxygen-free nitrogen) when supplied in cylinders.

Portable pneumatic tools and small vehicles, such as Robot Wars machines and other hobbyist applications are often powered by compressed carbon dioxide, because containers designed to hold it such as SodaStream canisters and fire extinguishers are readily available, and the phase change between liquid and gas makes it possible to obtain a larger volume of compressed gas from a lighter container than compressed air requires. Carbon dioxide is an asphyxiant and can be a freezing hazard if vented improperly.

== Comparison to hydraulics ==
Both pneumatics and hydraulics are applications of fluid power. Pneumatics uses an easily compressible gas such as air or a suitable pure gas—while hydraulics uses relatively incompressible liquid media such as oil. Most industrial pneumatic applications use pressures of about 80 to 100 psi (550 to 690 kPa). Hydraulics applications commonly use from 1,000 to 5,000 psi (6.9 to 34.5 MPa), but specialized applications may exceed 50,000 psi (340 MPa).

=== Advantages of pneumatics ===
- Simplicity of design and control—Machines are easily designed using standard cylinders and other components, and operate via simple on-off control.
- Reliability and shock absorption—Because gas is compressible, equipment is less subject to shock damage; gas cushions excessive forces and mechanical shock, whereas fluid in hydraulics directly transfers force.
- Energy storage—Compressed gas can be stored in reservoirs, allowing machines to complete operating cycles or maintain safety holds if primary power is lost.
- Safety—There is very low risk of fire compared to hydraulic mineral oils, and pneumatic actuators can stall safely without overheating or damaging components.

=== Advantages of hydraulics ===
- Direct energy transmission—Hydraulic fluid does not absorb supplied energy through compression, transmitting input work directly to the load.
- Higher force and power density—Capable of moving substantially higher loads and generating significantly greater force due to high operating pressures and fluid incompressibility.
- Precise motion and stiffness—The working fluid is practically incompressible, minimizing spring action and spongy control. When fluid flow stops, the position locks rigidly without the need to vent or bleed off expanding compressed air.
- Multi-purpose medium—Hydraulic fluids serve simultaneous roles in power transmission, heat dissipation/cooling, and internal lubrication.

== Pneumatic logic ==
Pneumatic logic systems (sometimes called air logic control) are sometimes used for controlling industrial processes, consisting of primary logic units like:

- And units
- Or units
- Relay or booster units
- Latching units
- Timer units
- Fluidics amplifiers with no moving parts other than the air itself

Pneumatic logic is a reliable and functional control method for industrial processes. In recent years, these systems have largely been replaced by electronic control systems in new installations because of the smaller size, lower cost, greater precision, and more powerful features of digital controls. Pneumatic devices are still used where upgrade cost, or safety factors dominate.

Another domain where pneumatic logic is beneficial is soft robotics. By introducing simpler pneumatic logic components into soft robotics, expensive, rigid components can be replaced or reduced, lowering the manufacturing costs of the construction of soft robotic systems.

== Examples of pneumatic systems and components ==
- Air brakes on buses and trucks
- Air brakes on trains
- Air compressors
- Air engines for pneumatically powered vehicles
- Barostat systems used in neurogastroenterology and for researching electricity
- Cable jetting, a way to install cables in ducts
- Dental drill
- Compressed-air engine and compressed-air vehicles
- Gas Chromatography
- Gas-operated reloading
- Holman Projector, a pneumatic anti-aircraft weapon
- HVAC control systems
- Inflatable structures
- Lego pneumatics can be used to build pneumatic models
- Pipe organ
  - Electro-pneumatic action
  - Tubular-pneumatic action
- Player piano
- Pneumatic actuator
- Pneumatic air guns
- Pneumatic bladder
- Pneumatic cylinder
- Pneumatic launchers, a type of spud gun
- Pneumatic mail systems
- Pneumatic motor
- Pneumatic tire
- Pneumatic tools:
  - Jackhammer used by road workers
  - Pneumatic nailgun
- Pressure regulator
- Pressure sensor
- Pressure switch
- Launched roller coaster
- Vacuum pump
- Vacuum sewer

== See also ==
- Compressed air
- Ozone cracking – can affect pneumatic seals
- Pneudraulics
- History of pneumatic power
