= Pneudraulics =

Term for hydraulic and pneumatic systems

Derived from the words hydraulics and pneumatics, pneudraulics is the term used when discussing systems on military aircraft that use either or some combination of hydraulic and pneumatic systems.

The science of fluids made of both gas and liquid.

== Pneudraulic systems ==
- Landing gear
- Flaps and slats
- Rudder
- Ailerons
- Speed brake
- Wheel brakes
- Nose wheel steering
