= Inflatable air cushion =

Fabric or plastic packaging

An inflatable air cushion is a bag of fabric or plastic that can be inflated to provide cushioning. Unlike bubble wrap, inflatable air cushions have a check valve to allow the cushion to be inflated or sometimes deflated.

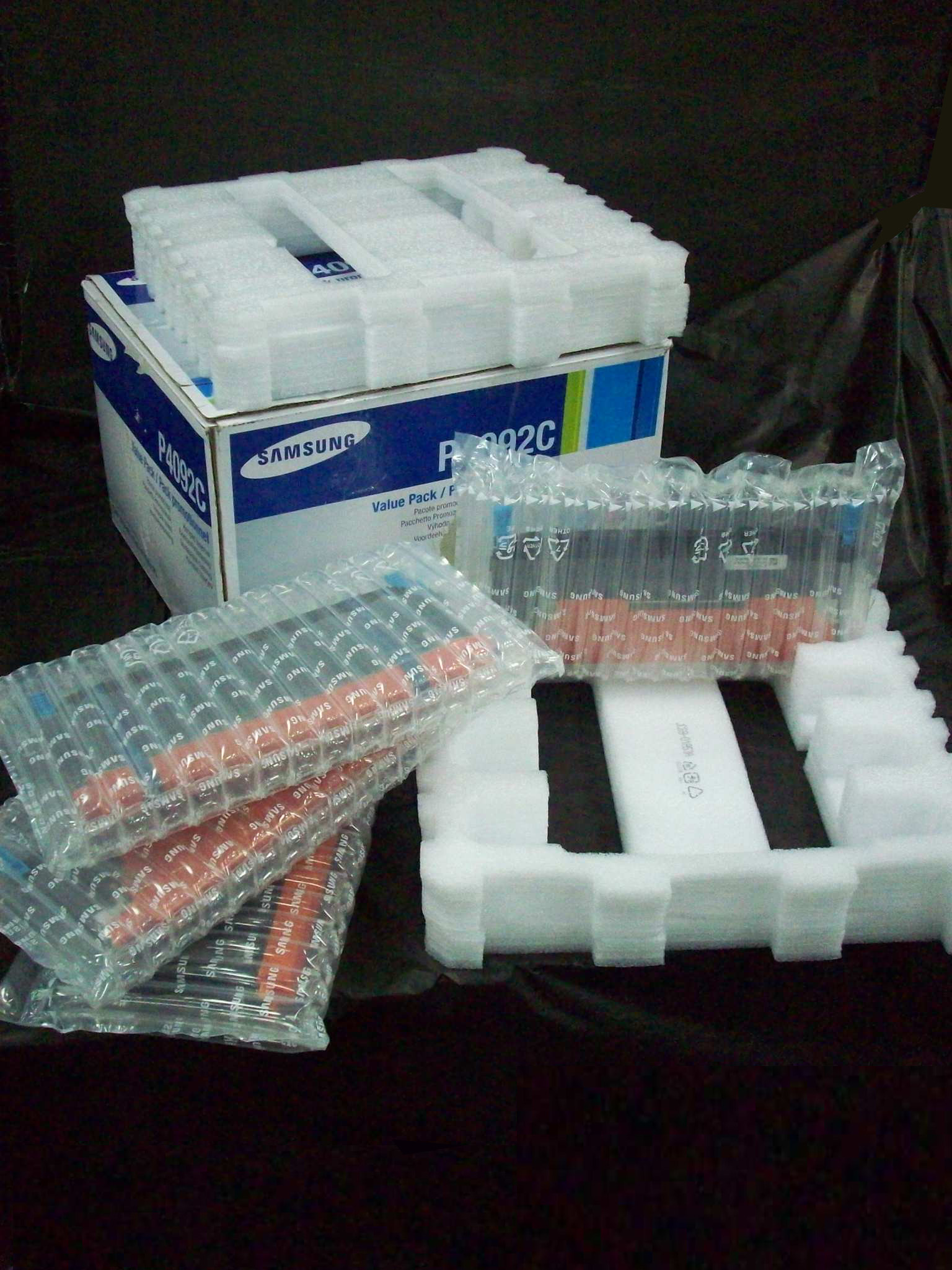
Samsung toner packaging in inflatable air cushion

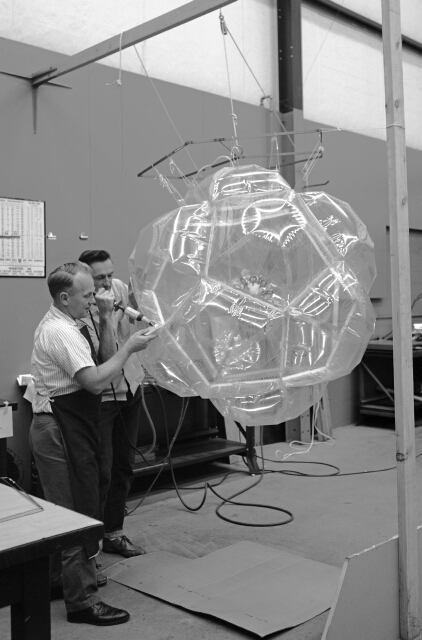
Impact limiter, JPL

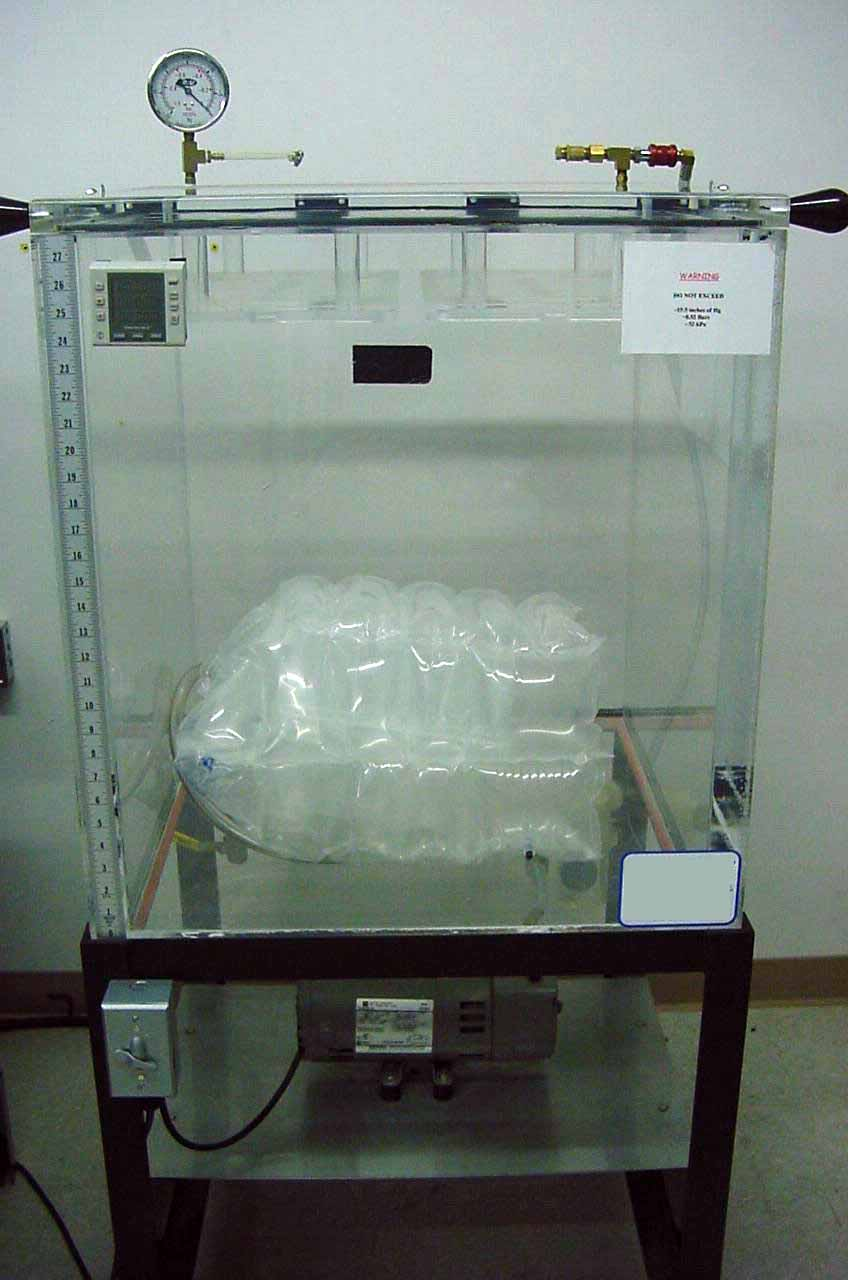
Vacuum chamber for testing leaks in inflatable cushion. ASTM D6653- Standard Test Methods for Determining the Effects of High Altitude on Packaging Systems by Vacuum Method

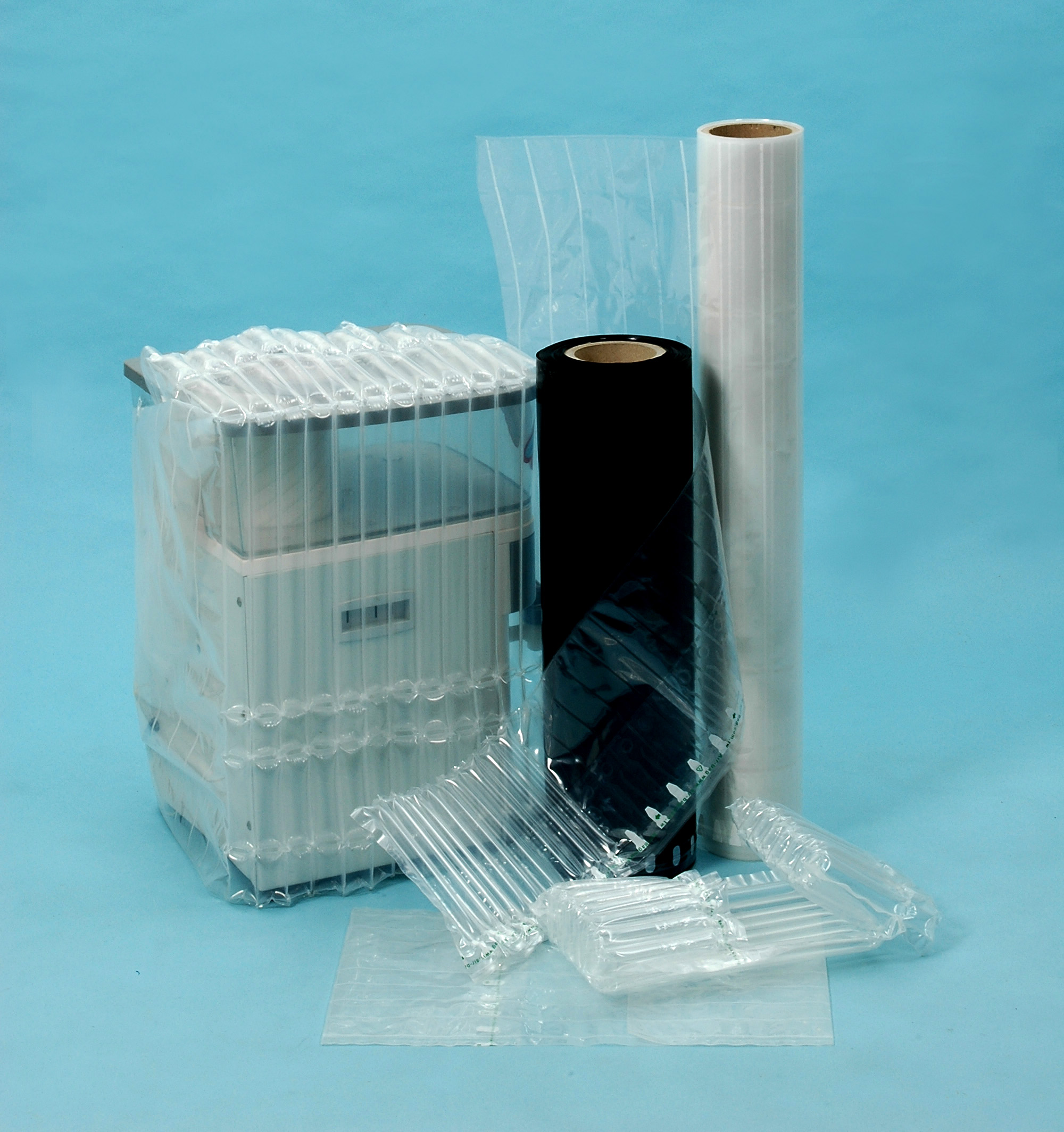
Inflatable air cushion shown deflated (on rolls) and inflated around a protected item.

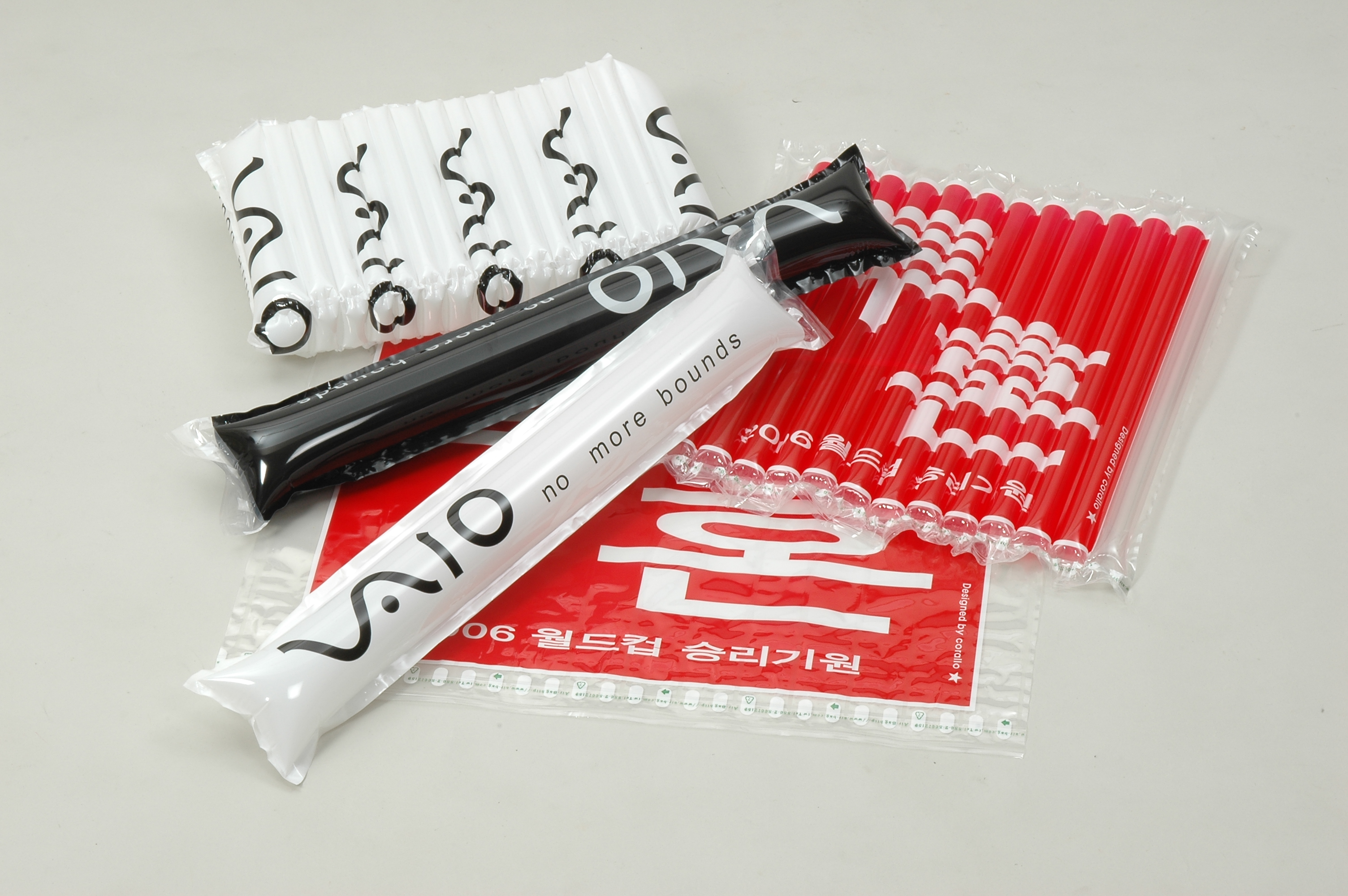
Inflatable air cushion can be used as a seat, stick, or signs

== History ==
Several constructions have been developed, some as early as the 1970s. In the 1980s, a number of inflatable cushion systems were documented. Before 2000, most inflatable air cushions used a single check valve. However if one part of the cushion was punctured then this packaging would completely deflate. In 2002, several types of continuously independent one way air valve films were introduced. These patents incorporated a one way air valve film, which can be produced continuously and independently. If one air tube is punctured, the other air tubes will still remain inflated.

== Concept ==
- A modern cushion is made out of two layers of PE films with air valve film in between, and heat pressed with high temperature mold to melt them together and create air tubes and shapes, so inflatable air cushions can have a variety of styles and types.
- The cushion can be shipped flat and inflated as needed. Once inflated the continuous check valve seals each tube from the others.
- The air pressure inside each of the inflated air cushions is greater than the atmosphere pressure, providing strong compressive strength and flexibility.

== Applications ==
- Protective and void filling materials, including block and brace, corner protection, wrapping, interleaving, top and cross layering.
- Shipping container cushioning
- Thundersticks
- Water resistant seat cushion
- Inflatable bags

== See also ==
- Bubble wrap
- Cushioning
- List of inflatable manufactured goods
- Dunnage bag
