= Firewater (fire fighting) =

Water used in firefighting

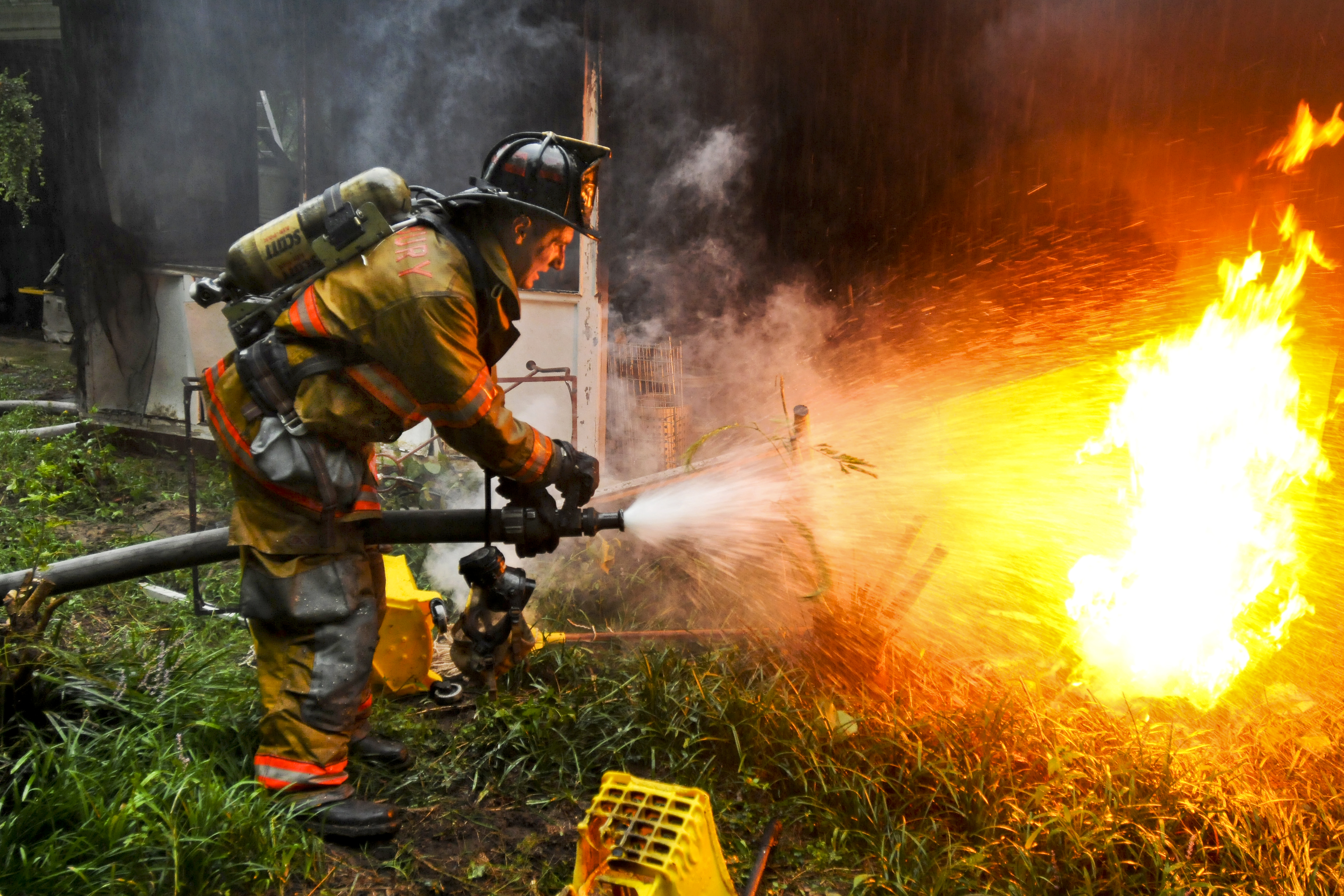
Firefighter using a water hose to put out a fire

Firewater refers to water that has been used in firefighting and requires disposal. In many cases, it is a highly polluting material and requires special care in its disposal.

== Description ==
In many firefighting situations, large quantities of water remain after the fire has been extinguished. This firewater contains materials present in the building and also contains dissolved and particulate materials from combustion processes and materials generated through quenching.

Firewater can be particularly polluting when the building or site being extinguished itself contains potentially polluting materials such as pesticides, organic and inorganic chemical reagents, fertilizers, etc. Certain premises, including farms and the chemical industry, pose special risks because of the types of materials present. Premises containing quantities of plastics can also cause severe problems because of the taste and odor imparted to the firewater.

Releasing contaminated firewater into a river, lake or other body that supplies drinking water may render the untreated supply unsuitable for drinking or food preparation. Managing firewater frequently requires that the water be contained on the site until removed from a specialized treat statement. One of the recognized techniques is to contain the firewater in the drainage system using pneumatic bladders or lockable non-return valves, which can be activated automatically or manually.

== Planning and risk assessment ==
Fire water management begins with an assessment of the materials that are stored at an incident location. It should also consider the routes by which contaminated runoff could reach the surrounding environment. The Ireland's Environmental Protection Agency describes a risk assessment that considers combustible materials, fire detection and sprinkler systems, and substances hazardous to aquatic life. The assessment determines whether retention is necessary. Capacity calculations estimate the required storage of materials. These calculations take into account for the expected runoff and rainfall during an incident. Changes to stored materials and drainage arrangements may require a review of the assessment.

Site plans provide information needed to manage runoff during an incident. The United Kingdom Environment Agency guidance for permitted waste facilities in England include the locations of hazardous materials, water supplies, drainage systems, and nearby areas vulnerable to pollution. The plans identify access routes for responding fire services and equipment that is available to contain contaminated water. Staff training and exercises establish how these plans will be used during a fire incident. The type of containment depends on the site's size, the quantity of waste stored, and the anticipated firefighting tactics.

== Containment ==
Firewater containment is the process of containing the run-off from fighting fires. Firewater contains many hazardous substances that result from combustion, which can turn safe materials into toxic, polluting and environmentally damaging substances. The preferred method of firewater containment is to use pneumatic bladders/drain stoppers that block the outflow from the drain or pneumatic non-return valves, both of which can convert the drains into containment vessels (called sumps) from which the firewater can be pumped away into tankers for safe disposal.

Firewater containment is one of the many environmental factors considered alongside spill and pollution containment as an essential part of any company's environmental policy for ISO14001 accreditation.

Firewater runoff often leaks into the surrounding environment through different routes such as rain, sprinkler systems (for example) or others. Containment of firewater is an integral component of preventing contamination of drainage and sewage systems, rivers, streams, and more. Pollution caused by firewater can last for hundreds of years following the initial use, making cost-effective and practical innovations to the current firewater containment system necessary for both the environment and businesses. Many of the largest negative environmental impacts due to firefighting related activities occur because of firewater runoff, making its containment necessary.

Firewater recycling is often considered a type of firewater containment and disposal to reduce water use and pollution, but the means to do so require further research. Compact and mobile filtration units are proposed for this task to contribute to the spray and foaming of contaminated water for firefighters.

Increased recycling of firewater has allowed a surplus of benefits that have not been fully researched. Although, recycling is highly recommended by several countries. The table below describes a corresponding overview of commercially available firewater in-drain spill and pollution containment system examples. Products such as Flapstopper and similar technology provide the latest efficient state-of-the-art technology.

Isolation valves are often used to prevent firewater from escaping the site of a fire until it can properly be removed. CIRIA C736 Containment systems for the prevention of pollution, a central industry guidance document in the United Kingdom designed to assist owners/operators of facilities storing potentially hazardous substances, exists as a response to faulty containment aiming to aid commercial and industrial facilities in the containment of potential firewater use.

Overview of commercially available firewater in-drain spill and pollution containment system examples
| Characteristics | Drainstopper | Flapstopper | Telestopper |
|---|---|---|---|
| Water-based firewater | Suitable | | Suitable with personal protective equipment |
| Oil-contaminated firewater | Suitable | | Suitable with personal protective equipment |
| Chemical-spill-contaminated firewater | Suitable | | Suitable with personal protective equipment |
| Bio-hazard-contaminated firewater | Suitable | | No |
| Fully automatic system | Yes | | —N/a |
| Battery-powered system | Yes | | —N/a |
| Retrofitting option | Yes | | Yes |
| Re-usability | Yes | Unlimited | Yes |
| Rodent-proof | Protection required | Fully | Yes |
| Drain opening range (cm) | 10 to 150 | | Up to 100 |
| Special features | Simple to install from above ground; easy to maintain; occupies <10% of drain area | Low energy consumption; manual emergency override | Fully portable with 3 m long extension pole; manual or electric pump to inflate |

== Pollution and notable events ==
Firewater's main association with pollution is its ability to rapidly spread hazardous substances if not correctly contained following use for firefighting; firewater run-off is often the culprit in or a main contributor to many chemical spill pollution events (see Water pollution). The Sandoz chemical spill of 1986, for example, turned the Rhine river red with pollutants and affected much of the wildlife due to faulty containment of the firewater used in treating an agrochemical warehouse fire, releasing 30 tonnes of toxic chemicals into the river.

Firewater containment and retention is an important issue because they can prevent the carrying of contaminants far from their sources through to connected bodies of water and neighboring areas. Drinking water, fish stocks, and other water-related necessities are potentially polluted by firewater. The Sandoz fire affected bodies of water connected to the Rhine in Switzerland, France, and Germany, despite the fire occurring only in Switzerland.

Often, damage to the environment following a fire at an industrial site occurs because of polluted firewater run-off. Water used in treating a fire may pick up contaminants from the burning object then leak into the surrounding environment when poorly contained. Rain and other environmental factors can increase the firewater run-off spread of a containment area. The 2013 Smethwick fire involved the burning of 100,000 t of plastic recycling materials and required 14 dam^{3} of firewater used for treatment within the first 12 hours of the initial burning, all pumped from the Birmingham Canal with the potential to disrupt the natural state of the canal and aid in the carrying of contaminated materials from the fire.

The UNECE Safety Guidelines and Good Practices for Fire-water Retention exist as a response to the Sandoz fire, outlining guidelines and proper practices for managing firewater and firewater retention.

== Fire prevention ==
Containment is the most commonly utilized methods of dealing with highly polluted fire-water, one other method would be the use of water distribution systems to give fire fighters an access to large quantities of water to combat large scale fires. This also gives firefighters access to high velocity water flow, which is known to have reduced toxicity and polluted levels. These, however, can still lead to polluted water. Even with high velocity water, it can still become polluted, even if the levels are indeed lower.

In using water as a main source of fire fighting, it is clear that there will always be some level of toxicity in the water that is utilized in the process of stopping these fires. Ultimately, the best method of lessening fire-water is preventing fires from happening in the first place. The most successful way of lessening toxicity of water after fire fighting, is therefore giving proper education to the public on preventing fires, in domestic homes and outside.
