= Bladder Lake =

Lake in the state of Minnesota, United States

- Location within Minnesota
- Location: Hubbard County, Minnesota
- Coordinates: 46°51′N 94°49′W
- Type: lake

Bladder Lake is a lake in Hubbard County, in the U.S. state of Minnesota.

Bladder Lake was so named on account of its outline being shaped like a bladder.

== See also ==
- List of lakes in Minnesota
