= Microducts =

Small ducts in which fiber optic cables can be installed

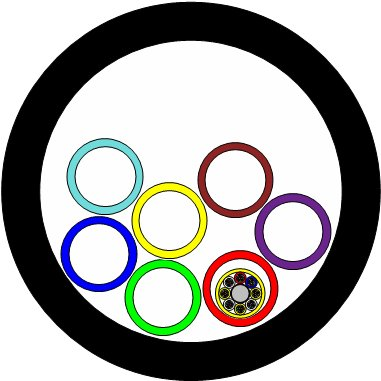
Protective duct with bundle of microducts and cable

Microducts are small ducts used for the installation of fibre optic cables. They have a typical size ranging from 3 to 16 mm and are installed as bundles within larger ducts.

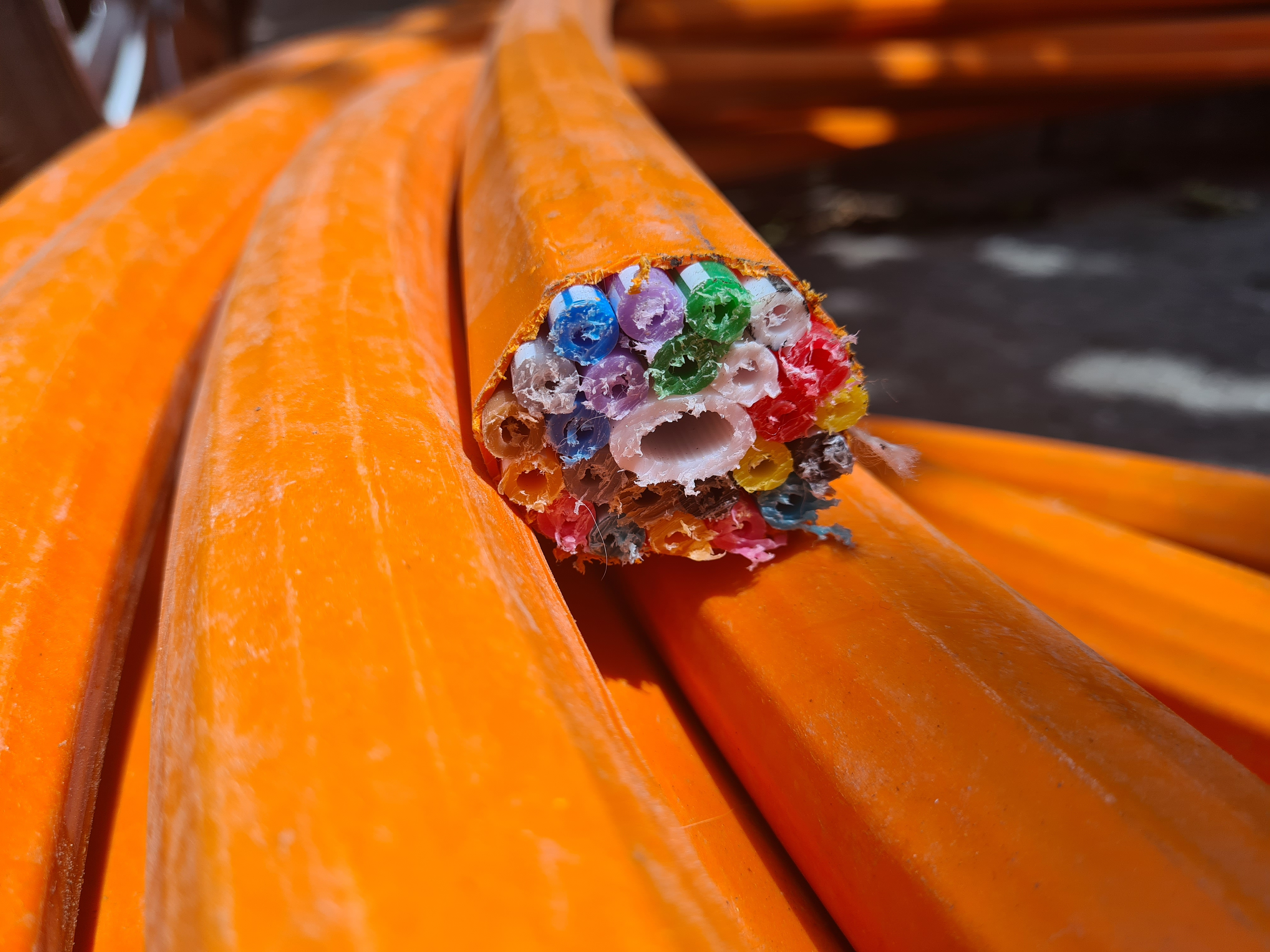
Microduct fiber cable being installed by Cosmote in Athens, Greece.

== Description ==
Microducts are typically small-diameter, flexible, or semi-flexible ducts designed to provide clean, continuous, low-friction paths for placing optical cables that have relatively low pulling tension limits. As stated in industry requirements document Telcordia GR-3155 Generic Requirements for Microducts for Fiber Optic Cables, microduct products are expected to:

- Be compatible with existing construction designs and building configurations for both riser- and plenum-rated applications, including cable blowing apparatus.
- Allow cables to be safely deployed through pull lines or strings using less than 50 lbs of force, and through cable blowing techniques at typical deployment speeds of 100–200 feet per minute.

== Types of ducts ==
GR-3155 states that the basic types of duct are smoothwall, corrugated, and ribbed. The selection of a particular duct design is dependent on those characteristics that are important to the end user. The need for a specific characteristic or combination of characteristics such as pulling strength, flexibility, or the lowest coefficient of friction will dictate the type of duct required.

== Duct options ==
Ducts can be purchased with a variety of options or features. One such enhancement is pre-lubrication. Pre-lubricated ducts may be either permanently impregnated with anti-friction compounds or coated with liquid lubricant during manufacture (see GR-3155). This may or may not eliminate the need for supplementary lubrication when pulling cable into the duct. Before using a supplementary lubricant with a pre-lubricated duct, the user should check with the manufacturer to determine if the added lubricant is compatible with the pre-lubricated surface of the duct. Failure to do this may result in the cable seizing up rather than reducing the friction coefficient of the duct.

== Placement of cable ==
As indicated in GR-3155, cable is typically placed into the duct in one of three ways:

- It may be pre-installed by the duct manufacturer during the extrusion process.
- It may be pulled into the duct using a mechanically assisted or hand-drawn pull line.
- It may be blown into the duct using a high air volume cable blowing apparatus.

=== Pre-installed cable ===
When cable is pre-installed, the duct manufacturer extrudes the duct directly over the optical cable. Tight control of the duct temperature during the manufacturing process is essential to ensure that the duct does not stick to the cable as it cools. At the completion of the process, all of the fibers in the optical cable must be tested to ensure that no damage has occurred.

=== Cable pulling ===
A common cable installation technique for fiber cables remains cable pulling. After the duct is placed, a high-strength pull line is blown into the duct (if one has not already been pre-installed by the duct manufacturer). The pull line is attached to one end of the cable and is used to pull the cable through the duct.

=== Cable blowing ===
Traditional cable pulling methods are very sensitive to the condition of the duct and to the number of bends and undulations throughout the duct route. Therefore, for microducts, air-blown cable installation techniques are expected to be the most useful. Air-blown cable installation requires the use of a device that injects a high volume of air into the duct, at pressures as high as 20-25 psi. The viscous drag forces generated by the rushing air along the length of the cable act to reduce or overcome the friction between the cable and the duct.

== Traditional duct installation ==
For telecommunications, cables can be installed in water, in air or underground. In the latter case, the cables might be direct buried or installed in ducts. The first is more common for copper balanced cables; the latter for fibre optic cables. The ducts in which the fibre optic cables are installed are usually made of polyethylene. They have a size ranging from typically 25 mm to 100 mm. Sometimes they are installed as subducts in larger ducts. These larger ducts can also consist of other materials, like concrete. The installation of fibre optic cables in ducts can be done by pulling or by cable jetting.

== Problems with fibre optic cables ==
It is more difficult to make branching fibre optic networks in the access network than it is for copper balanced cables. Splicing optical fibres is much more difficult than connecting copper wires. In Fibre to the Home (FTTH), where multiple branches are present in the network, an Optical Distribution Network is used to branch the cables from a roadside cabinet or pit that contains optical equipment and is fed from the Central Office

== Microduct cabling ==
Jetting a bundle of microducts

With microduct cabling, bundles of small microducts may be installed in larger protective duct (e.g., PVC conduit). This can be done by jetting for example. Bundles of microducts can also be factory pre-installed. The microducts can be branched very easily in the network. At any place of choice, a window cut is made in the protective duct and the microduct of choice is cut. This microduct is then connected, using a simple push/pull connector, to a microduct that branches to the desired location. After all connections are made, an individual microduct path has been created in the network. A microduct cable can then be jetted through the microduct, without the need to make a splice.

== Advantages over traditional cabling ==
1. A branch can be made simply, any place, at any time.
2. Low initial costs.
3. The network can grow on demand.
4. Easy to install microduct routes in occupied ducts.
5. Easy to replace old cables through the network.
6. Possibility to migrate from copper balanced cables to fibre optic cables.

== Practice ==
Jetting a microduct cable

Today the microduct cabling technology is used more and more, all over the world. The fibre counts have grown up to 144 per cable and can be installed in microducts of only 8 mm inner diameter. Bundles of microducts can be jetted over 1500 m or more. Microduct cables can even be jetted over 3.5 km in one single shot. More length without splice is reached by placing jetting equipment in tandem.
