= Cable jetting =

Technique to install cables in ducts

Cable jetting is a technique to install cables in ducts. It is commonly used to install cables with optical fibers in underground polyethylene ducts and is an alternative to pulling.

== Pulling ==
Traditionally, fibre optic cables were pulled through cable ducts in the same way as other cables, via a winch line. Every time the fibre passes a bend or undulation in the duct, the pulling force is multiplied by a friction-dependent factor (which can be reduced by using lubricant). This means that the higher the local pulling force is, the more friction the cable will experience while being pulled against the internal duct wall. This "capstan effect" leads to an exponential force build-up with pull distance, producing generally high pulling forces.

== Jetting ==
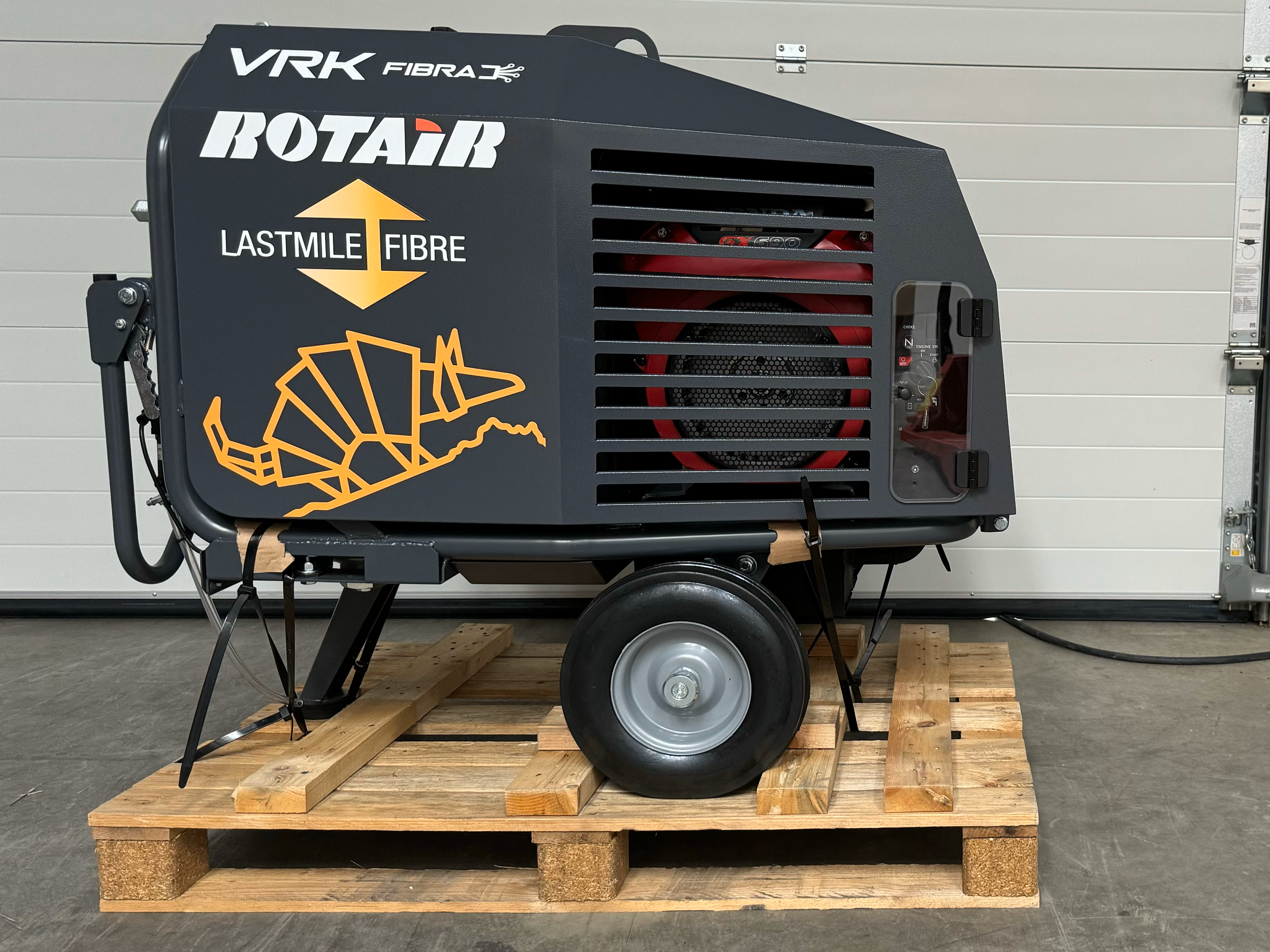
LastMile Fibre VRK20 15bar air compressor used for cable jetting

Cable jetting is the process of blowing a cable through a duct while simultaneously pushing the cable into the duct. Compressed air is injected at the duct inlet and flows through the duct and along the cable at high speed. (Preferably, no suction pig is used at the cable head.) The high speed air propels the cable due to drag forces and pressure drop. The friction of the cable against the duct is reduced by the distributed airflow, and large forces that would generate high friction are avoided. Because of the expanding airflow, the air propelling forces are relatively small at the cable inlet and large at the air exhaust end of the duct. To compensate for this, an additional pushing force is applied to the cable by the jetting equipment. The pushing force, acting mainly near the cable inlet, combined with the airflow propelling forces, increases the maximum jetting distance considerably. Special lubricants have been developed for cable jetting to further reduce friction.

== Advantages of jetting compared to pulling ==
1. Longer installation distances can be reached
2. Installation distance less dependent on bends and undulations in duct
3. Forces exerted on the cable are lower
4. Easier use jet in tandem operation
5. The step of installing a winch rope is avoided
6. Equipment is needed only at one end of the duct route

== Practice ==
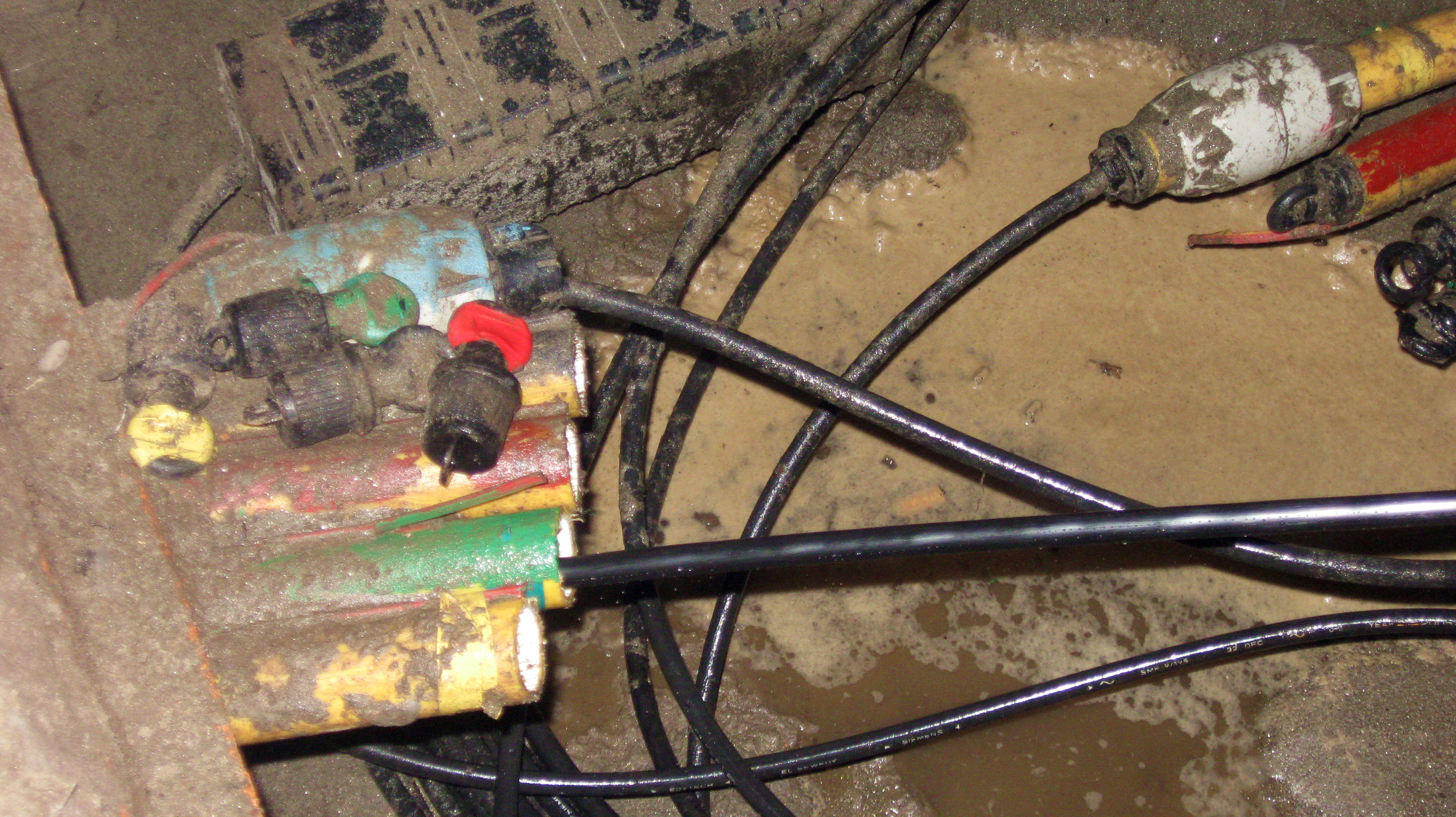
Banglalink performing cable-jetting at Shantinagar, Dhaka. Couplers are shown for optical fibers and polyethylene ducts.

In the 21st century the cable jetting technique is used worldwide, from small optical telecom cables (1.8 mm diameter) in small microducts (3 mm internal diameter) up to large copper telecom cables (35 mm diameter) in large ducts (50 mm internal diameter). Jetting is done with a pressure of the compressed air in the order of 10 bar. With the jetting technique distances per blow of 3.5 km have been reached , while spliceless links of 12 km have been reached by placing jetting equipment in tandem. It is possible to install 12 km in one day with one small crew.

In mid 1990s the technique was also developed to install multiple smaller microducts, bundles, into a larger duct in one installation. This is called multi-ducting, microduct cabling, or bundle blowing. Each can hold a cable.

Another capability is to install a single cable or a bundle of small ducts into an occupied duct. The most expensive activity in installing a network is the need for civil works. Thus, re-using ducts occupied with one cable, leaving some space, is a tempting and often possible and cost-effective alternative.

== History ==
The technique of installing flexible and lightweight fibre optic units using compressed air was developed during the 1980s by British Telecom. This early version of jetting did not use additional pushing. True cable jetting was invented by Willem Griffioen of KPN Research in the late 1980s. The necessary equipment was developed in cooperation with Plumettaz, Switzerland.

== Sources ==
- Griffioen, W., "A new installation method for fibre optic cables in conduits", Proc. 37th IWCS, November 1988, page 172
- Griffioen, W., "The installation of conventional fibre optic cables in conduits using the viscous flow of air", J. Lightwave Technol., Vol. 7, no. 2 (1989) 297
- Griffioen, W., "Installation of optical cables in ducts", Plumettaz, PTT Research 1993 (ISBN 90-72125-37-1)
- Griffioen, W., Plumettaz, G., "Current developments in cable-in-duct blowing techniques", Proc. 46th IWCS, November 1997, page 363-367
- Griffioen, W., Plumettaz, G., "Current development in cable-in-duct blowing techniques" Proc. ANCIT Workshop (Eurescom), Torino, 30–31 March 1998
- Griffioen, W., Greven, W., Pothof, T. "A new fiber optic life for old ducts", Proc. 51st IWCS, November 2002, page 244-250
- Griffioen, W., Zandberg, S., Versteeg, P. M., Keijzer, M., "Blow Simulation Test to Measure coefficient of Friction between (Micro)Duct and cable", Proc. 54th IWCS, November 2005, page 413-420
