= Eurescom =

Eurescom is a private organisation for managing European research and development projects in telecommunications. Eurescom is based in Heidelberg, Germany, and currently has 16 network operators as members performing collaborative research and development.

Eurescom logo

== History ==
In 1991, the European Institute for Research and Strategic Studies in Telecommunications GmbH (Eurescom) was founded by European telecommunications network operators as an organisation for coordinating collaborative research and development programmes. In mid-1990, 26 European network operators signed a Memorandum of Understanding as a basis for establishing the institute as a centre for collaborative research and development in Heidelberg, Germany.

Since 1991, Eurescom produced several hundred European telecommunications technology project results. Eurescom made, for example, contributions to the introduction of interoperable European ISDN, the design of network management systems, specifications in the Internet domain, and the development of new services and applications for mobile networks and fixed networks.

Eurescom works with other European organisations in the telecommunications sector, including the European Telecommunications Standards Institute. In 1998, ETSI, Eurescom and the ACTS programme on Advanced Communications Technologies of the European Commission agreed on closer collaboration.

== Members ==
- Deutsche Telekom, Germany
- France Telecom, France
- BT Group, United Kingdom
- OTE, Greece
- Portugal Telecom, Portugal
- Telekom Austria, Austria
- Telenor, Norway
- eircom, Ireland
- Magyar Telekom, Hungary
- CYTA, Cyprus
- Síminn, Iceland
- Slovak Telecom, Slovak Republic
- Republic Telecommunication Agency (RATEL), Republic of Serbia
- Swisscom, Switzerland
- Telecom Italia, Italy

== Activities ==
Eurescom has been involved in EU research projects under the Framework Programmes for Research and Technological Development and EUREKA. Eurescom participates in discussions on the future of information and communication technologies (ICT) as a member of the Wireless World Research Forum and in the European Technology Platforms Emobility Technology Platform and Networked and Electronic Media. Eurescom is involved in future Internet research. In addition, Eurescom runs its own Eurescom Study Programme, in which European network operators collaborate on exploring future telecommunications technologies. Eurescom provides a set of Web-based project management tools called EuresTools.

== See also ==
- Community Research & Development Information Service (CORDIS)
- EUREKA
- European Institute of Innovation and Technology (EIT)
- European Research Area (ERA)
- European Research Council (ERC)
- European Telecommunications Standards Institute (ETSI)
- Lisbon Strategy
- Project management
- Framework Programmes for Research and Technological Development
