= Pneumatic bladder =

A pneumatic bladder is an inflatable (pneumatic) bag technology with many applications.

== Emergency management applications ==
Pneumatic bladders are used to seal drains and ducts to contain chemical spills or gases. Pneumatic bladders are often used for the containment of chemical spills, oil spills or fire water on water to prevent them from entering the environment, usually in the form of booms.

== Marine applications ==
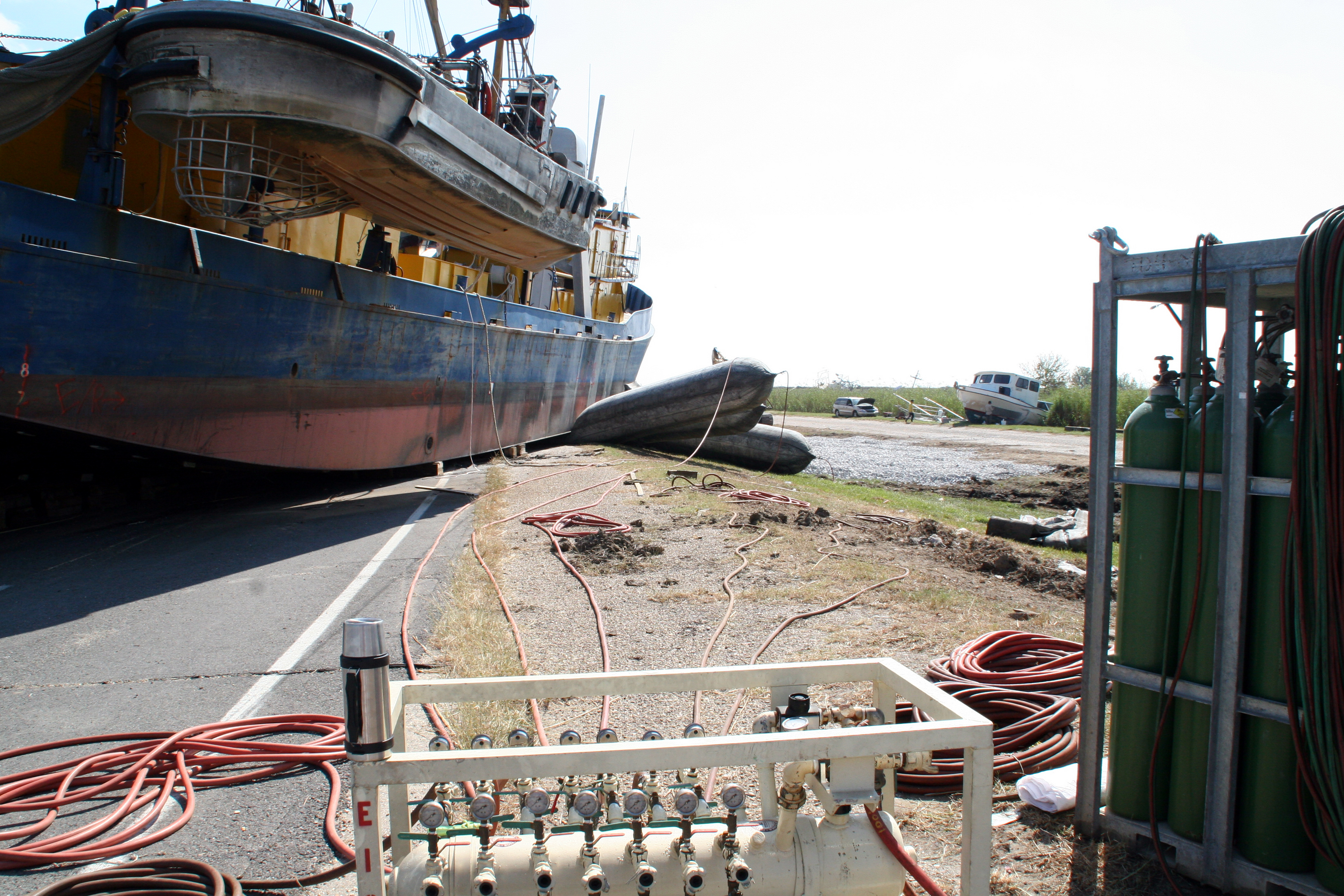
Grounded freighter after Hurricane Katrina, being salvaged using pneumatic bladders to raise and roll it back into the water

The Reef Ball Foundation uses a pneumatic bladder technology to float an artificial coral reef ("reef ball") into location, then deflate the bladder to sink the reef to the bottom.

== Other applications ==
Pneumatic bladders, known as dunnage bags, are used to stabilize cargo within a container.

Pneumatic bladders are used in medical research.

Leading edge inflatable kites use pneumatic bladders restrained by a fabric case; the bladder is selected slightly larger than the case, so that at operational inflation the bladder is not stressed while the case defines the final shape of the leading edge. Many of the wing's airfoil ribs are similarly bladdered.

== See also ==
- Balloon
- Bladder
- Bladder (disambiguation)
- Fuel bladder
- Swim bladder
- List of inflatable manufactured goods
